= Vantaa =

City in Uusimaa, Finland

Vantaa Vanda
- City
- Vantaan kaupunki Vanda stad City of Vantaa
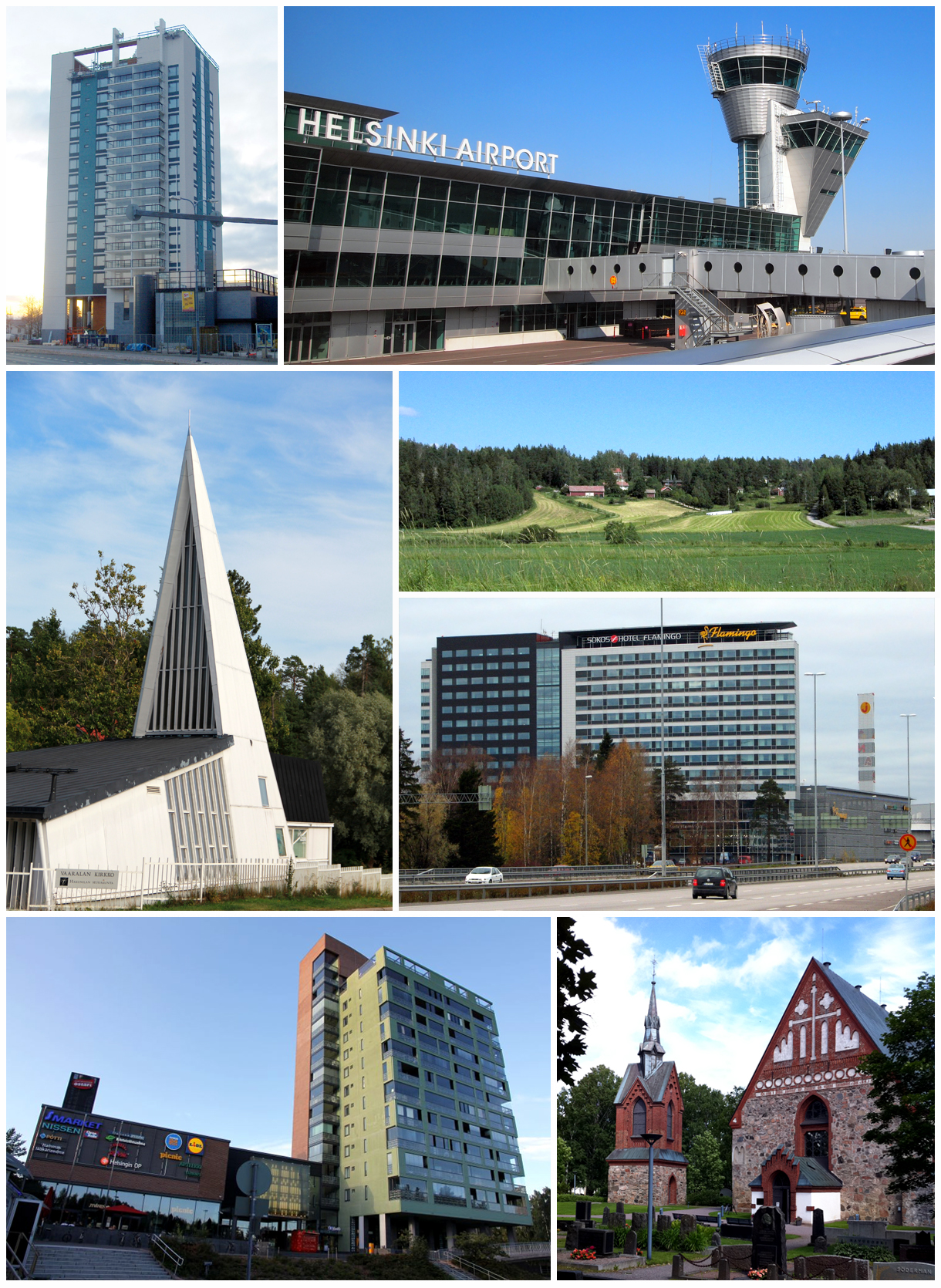
- Clockwise from top-left: Kielotorni in Tikkurila, Helsinki Airport, Sotunki, Flamingo and Jumbo shopping centers, the Church of St. Lawrence, Ostari shopping center in Martinlaakso, and the Vaarala Church.

- Flag Coat of arms

- Location of Vantaa in Finland
- Interactive map of Vantaa
- Coordinates: 60°17′40″N 025°02′25″E
- Country: Finland
- Region: Uusimaa
- Sub-region: Helsinki sub-region
- Metropolitan area: Helsinki metropolitan area
- Charter: 1351
- Köping: 1972
- City: 1974
- Seat: Tikkurila
- Major hubs: Aviapolis, Hakunila, Kivistö, Koivukylä, Korso, Myyrmäki

Government
  - City manager: Pekka Timonen
  - Deputy managers: Riikka Åstrand, Katri Kalske, Tero Anttila
  - Sector directors: Tiina Harju-Kukkula, Matti Ruusula, Tommo Koivusalo, Mari Kalmari, Leena Rusanen

Area (2018-01-01)
  - Total: 240.35 km^{2} (92.80 sq mi)
  - Land: 238.38 km^{2} (92.04 sq mi)
  - Water: 1.97 km^{2} (0.76 sq mi)
  - Rank: 250th largest in Finland

Population (2025-12-31)
  - Total: 252,956
  - Rank: 4th largest in Finland
  - Density: 1,061.15/km^{2} (2,748.4/sq mi)

Population by native language
  - Finnish: 68% (official)
  - Swedish: 2.1% (official)
  - Others: 29.9%

Population by age
  - 0 to 14: 17.2%
  - 15 to 64: 67.3%
  - 65 or older: 15.5%
- Time zone: UTC+02:00 (EET)
  - Summer (DST): UTC+03:00 (EEST)
- Unemployment rate: 7.8%
- Climate: Dfb
- Website: www.vantaa.fi/en

Vantaa (Finnish pronunciation: [ˈʋɑntɑː]; Swedish: Vanda, Finland Swedish: [ˈvɑnːdɑ]) is a city in Finland. It is located to the north of the capital, Helsinki, in southern Uusimaa. The population of Vantaa is approximately 253,000. It is the 4th most populous municipality in Finland. Vantaa is part of the Helsinki Metropolitan Area, which has approximately 1.6 million inhabitants.

The administrative centre of Vantaa is located in the Tikkurila district. Vantaa lies in Southern Finland and shares borders with Helsinki, the Finnish capital, to the south, Espoo to the southwest, Nurmijärvi to the northwest, Kerava and Tuusula to the north, and Sipoo to the east. The city covers a total area of 240.35 square kilometres (92.80 sq mi), of which 1.97 km^{2} (0.76 sq mi) is water.

Vantaa's significant attractions include the Vantaa River (Vantaanjoki), which runs through the city before flowing into the Gulf of Finland. The Helsinki Airport, situated in Vantaa, serves as the largest airport in Finland and the primary airline hub for the Helsinki metropolitan area. Companies headquartered in Vantaa comprise Finnair, Finavia, R-kioski, Tikkurila Oyj, Veikkaus, and Metsähallitus. Additionally, Vantaa is home to Heureka, a science center.

Vantaa is a bilingual municipality with Finnish and Swedish as its official languages. The population consists of 68% Finnish speakers, 2% Swedish speakers (the lowest percentage out of any bilingual municipality in Finland), and 30% speakers of other languages, which is well above the national average. According to the 2025 disturbance index used by the Finnish Police, Vantaa is currently the most unsafe city in Finland.

== Etymology ==
Colonists arriving from Sweden in the 14th century settled in the area what is now Vantaa and named the river in the area as Helsingå or Helsingaa. The etymology of this name is not known for sure, but according to an old tradition it probably comes from colonists who originally arrived at the Hälsingland area in Sweden.

The same river has also been known as the river Vantaa (Vanda å in Swedish). Unlike the name Helsingaa, the name Vantaa comes from the Finnish-speaking Tavastian inhabitants upstream of the river. There is a village named Vantaa near the source of the river, at the area which now belongs to the city of Riihimäki. According to a theory, the name comes from the Finnish words vanan taka, where vana means a riverbed and so Vantaa (possibly originally spelled "Vanantaa") means a place behind a riverbed. Only later did the name also came to use also downstream and replace the old name Helsingaa.

The Vanhankaupunginkoski rapids at the mouth of the river Vantaa were originally known as Helsinge fors ("Helsinki rapids"), which also gave the name Helsingfors to the city founded along the rapids.

The Vantaa blast furnace founded at the shore of the Vantaankoski rapids in 1837 gave the name "Vantaa" to its entire environment.

By the new municipal law in 1865 the Finnish name of the municipality became Helsingin maalaiskunta ("the rural municipality of Helsinki"), when the concept of sockens in Finland was discontinued. The Swedish name remained as Helsinge, in contrast to Helsingfors, the Swedish name for Helsinki proper. When Helsingin maalaiskunta became a market town in 1972, proposed new names included Helsingin kauppala, Helsinginjoen kauppala and Vantaanjoen kauppala. The accepted name was Vantaan kauppala after the river Vantaa. Two years later Vantaa received city rights.

== History ==
Vantaa has a rich history that dates back to the Stone Age. The area was inhabited by Tavastians and Finns proper until the so-called second crusade to Finland and Swedish colonisation of the area.

=== Ancient history ===
Remains of an ancient rectangular dwelling dating to 6700 to 6500 BCE have been discovered in Brunaberg in Vantaa. At the time, the dwelling was located at the seashore near the mouth of the Keravanjoki river. The dwelling had been used for decades, apparently mostly in wintertime. A graveyard-like dwelling dating to the Mesolithic has been discovered in Jönsas, which was located at the mouth of a seaside bay at the time. In the Stone Age, people in Vantaa sought their food mostly from the sea. Seals were an important quarry, but remains of harbour porpoises have also been found at the numerous Neolithic dwelling sites at Jokiniemi. Remains of permanent dwellings found from Stenkulla in Hakkila date from the same period.

There are considerably many findings from the Comb Ceramic culture in Vantaa. Many ancient clay figures representing humans have been found in Jokiniemi in Vantaa. They have been estimated to be of various ages from 5300 to 5500 years old. During the typical Comb Ceramic time, large amounts of flint were brought to Finland from the south and southeast, which was made into blades and points, as well as amber. The Comb Ceramic era humans also knew how to use bows and arrows as weapons.

Iron Age history in Vantaa is not very well known, but the entire Uusimaa area was still a sparsely populated backland of Tavastia at the end of the Iron Age. The most researched Iron Age dwelling in Vantaa is located at the same site as the earlier Stone Age dwellings of Jönsas and Palmu. Remains of Morby ceramics have been discovered at these sites, and iron slag has also been discovered in Jönsas. Remains of fireplaces dating to the Iron Age have also been researched in Jönsas. Remains of dwellings dating to the 10th century have been discovered in Gubbacka in Länsisalmi as well as remains of ironworking sites from the 12th and 13th centuries.

Information about ancient villages located in the Vantaa area can be found in concentration of soil visible in palynological analysis as well as retroactive reasoning based on nomenclature and historical documents. According to historian Saulo Kepsu, Finnish population has spread from Tavastia to the Helsinki and Vantaa area in the 11th to 14th centuries, possibly even earlier. The Tavastians had fishing places and other pleasure grounds in the area.

=== Swedish rule ===
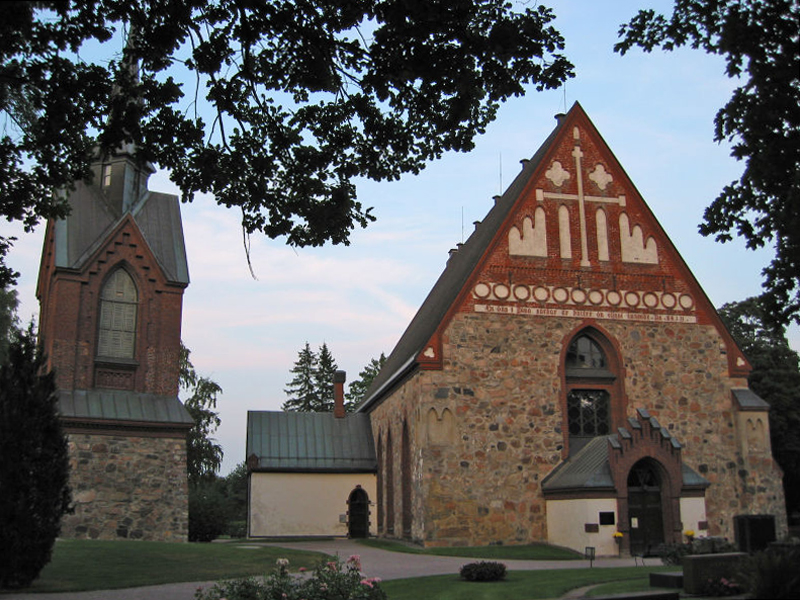
The Church of St. Lawrence is the oldest building in the Helsinki capital region. The church is located in the district of Helsingin pitäjän kirkonkylä, which still remains one of the most Swedish-speaking areas of Vantaa.

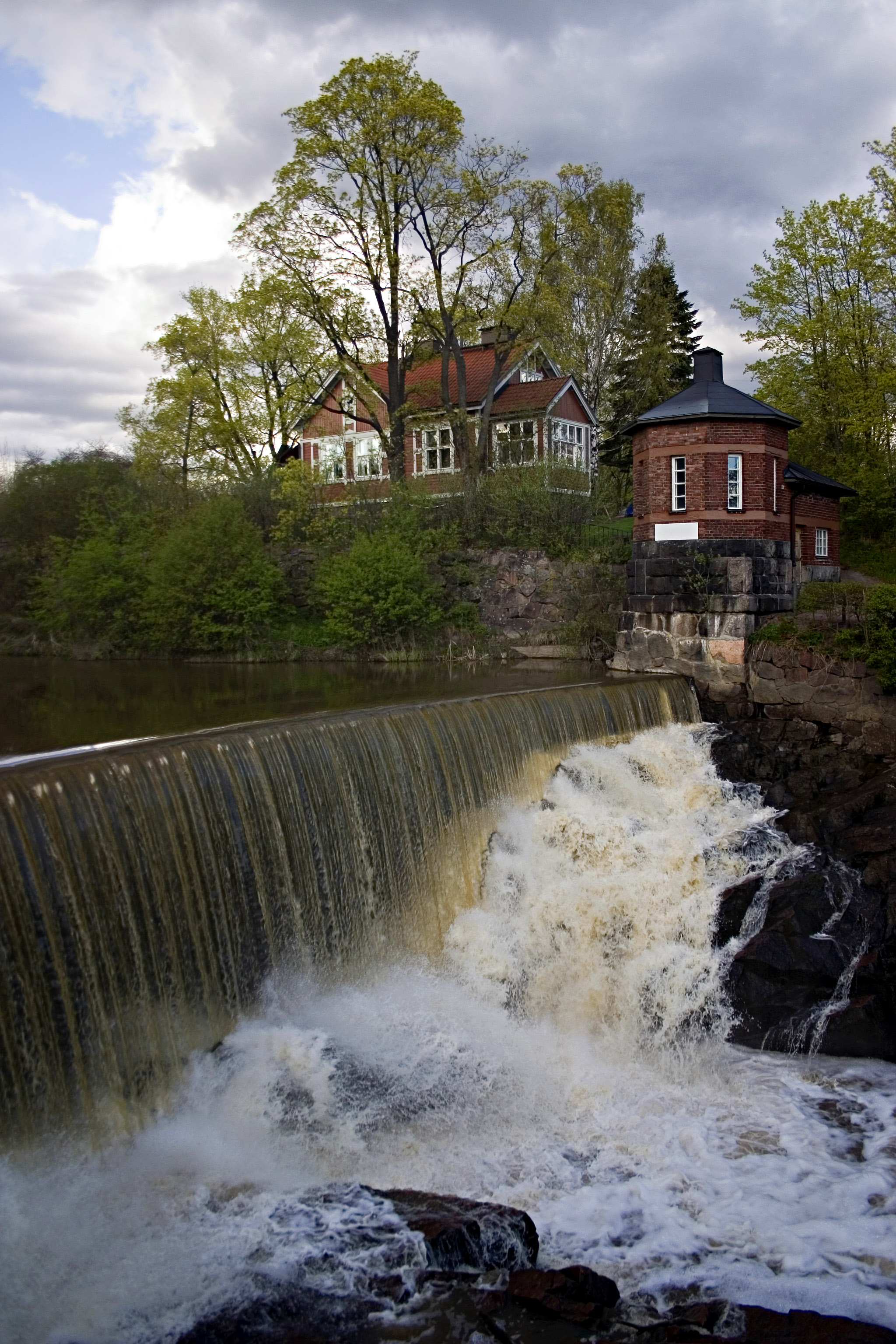
Vanhankaupunginkoski.

Prior to the name Vantaa being taken into use in 1974, the area was known as Helsingin pitäjä (Swedish: Helsinge; "Socken of Helsinki"). The rapids of river Vantaa were known as Helsingfors, from which the current Swedish name of Helsinki derives. Early settlement in Vantaa was centered around the river, in Helsingin pitäjän kirkonkylä ("Helsinki Parish Village"), and from it the city's current coat of arms derived its imagery.

The Swedish colonisation in Vantaa started in connection with the colonisation in the rest of Uusimaa in the late 13th century after the Second Swedish Crusade. The Swedes called the area Ny land ("new land"). There was permanent settlement in the area of the branching point of the rivers in the 14th century.

The history of Helsingin pitäjä stretches at least to the 14th century. For a long time it was thought that the earliest record of the area was as Helsinge in 1351 when king Magnus IV of Sweden granted salmon fishing rights on the river Helsingaa (now known as the river Vantaa) to the Estonian Padise Abbey. However, according to current knowledge, the first mention of Vantaa was in a document given by king Magnus IV in Västerås on 14 September 1331, describing episcopal tithes, requiring a pound of butter for the bishop from every citizen of age 7 years or older.

Since the 14th century, the road between Turku and Vyborg, King's Road, has run through Vantaa. The road brought significant attention to the city, and its location on the salmon rich river led to a permanent population.

The river Helsingaa soon gave its name to the entire area, and also inspired the coat of arms of Vantaa. The Helsinki socken was born from the 1370s to the 1390s, and the Church of St. Lawrence was built there in 1460. The church was located in a transport hub near the rivers of Vantaa and Kerava. Many roads also ran through the clerical centre: the King's Road from Turku to Vyborg and the Häme road to the Häme Castle and to the coast in the south. The first vicar in Helsingin pitäjä was mentioned in 1395. Helsingin pitäjä is seen as having established itself as a clerical and administrative parish in the 15th century, and the first mention of a church dedicated to Saint Lawrence in the area is from 1401. A local frälse family donated a land worth one skattmark from Rekola to the church of St. Lawrence. The name Helsinge was first mentioned in 1428. In the same year, fishing rights in the area were moved over to the Archdiocese of Turku, which helped the construction of a stone church to replace the old wooden one.

Justice in Helsingin pitäjä was the responsibility of its own district court. It is known that the parish had its own district court in the 16th century. The court could be held by deputies hired by high-ranking judges, so-called lawreaders. The use of lawreaders was common from the late 16th century to the 1680s.

Because of its poor location, Porvoo could not compete with the Hanseatic merchants in Tallinn, so in 1550 king Gustav Vasa decided to found the city of Helsinki at the site of Helsingin pitäjä at the mouth of the Helsingaa river. Helsingin pitäjä had already developed into a significant centre of marine trade in Uusimaa in the 1530s. However, the Vanhakaupunki area in Helsinki never became the city centre Gustav Vasa wanted during his lifetime.

In 1570, the 25-year Russian war also affected life in Helsingin pitäjä. Increased stress, additional military tax and enemy attacks had their toll on the population and often led to farmsteads being deserted. In 1577 there were 51 farmsteads burned and raided by the enemy. Serving food to and accommodating the military departments was the responsibility of police chief Olof Mårtensson, who lived at the Malmi horsestead. The largest department served by the police chief consisted of 40 horsemen from the Uppland unit in January 1576. As well as the Malmi horsestead, Helsingin pitäjä was also home to the horsesteads of Pukinmäki, Herttoniemi, Haltiala, Kirkonkylä, Meilby, Kulosaari and Heickby.

After the Treaty of Stolbovo, the Diet of Helsinki granted the rights of a staple town to Helsinki for foreign trade in 1617. The wars against Poland and Germany in the 1620s led to many large manors for the nobility being built in Helsingin pitäjä to support the cavalry, including Westerkulla and Hakunila. In autumn 1640, it was decided to move Helsinki from the Vanhakaupunki area to its current location at Vironniemi. The village of Töölö was annexed from Helsingin pitäjä to Helsinki proper in 1644, and in 1652 the parish congregation lost its independent status, and in order to support the economy of the Helsinki congregation, the entire church parish of Helsinki was annexed to the city congregation of Helsinki.

The Great Famine of 1695–1697 also had its toll on Helsingin pitäjä. Successive years of crop loss caused famine and mortality was high. As well as the peasants, the famine also affected servants of the crown, both the noble and the common estates, and the bourgeoisie.

During the Great Wrath Russian troops invaded Helsingin pitäjä in 1713. Some of the inhabitants fled to the mother country of Sweden or into nearby forests, some fought back against the invaders. As the invasion grew long, circumstances slowly settled and the Treaty of Nystad was made in autumn 1721. A second, shorter invasion, known as the Lesser Wrath, happened from 1742 to 1743.

Circumstances in Helsingin pitäjä started improving in the 1720s, as it became one of the most important centres of early industry in Finland. Water-powered sawmills were built in the area, forming a significant concentration of export industry at the time. This export was directed both to central Europe and also far way to the Mediterranean Sea in the late 18th century. A significant export target for Helsingin pitäjä was located just near its coast: the construction of the Sveaborg fortress, started in 1748, required large amounts of workforce and agricultural and industrial products such as foodstuffs, wood, brick and lime.

Helsingin pitäjä was a Swedish-speaking area. From the middle 18th century to the early 19th century, only about a tenth of the population of the parish spoke Finnish.

=== Grand Duchy of Finland under Russian rule ===
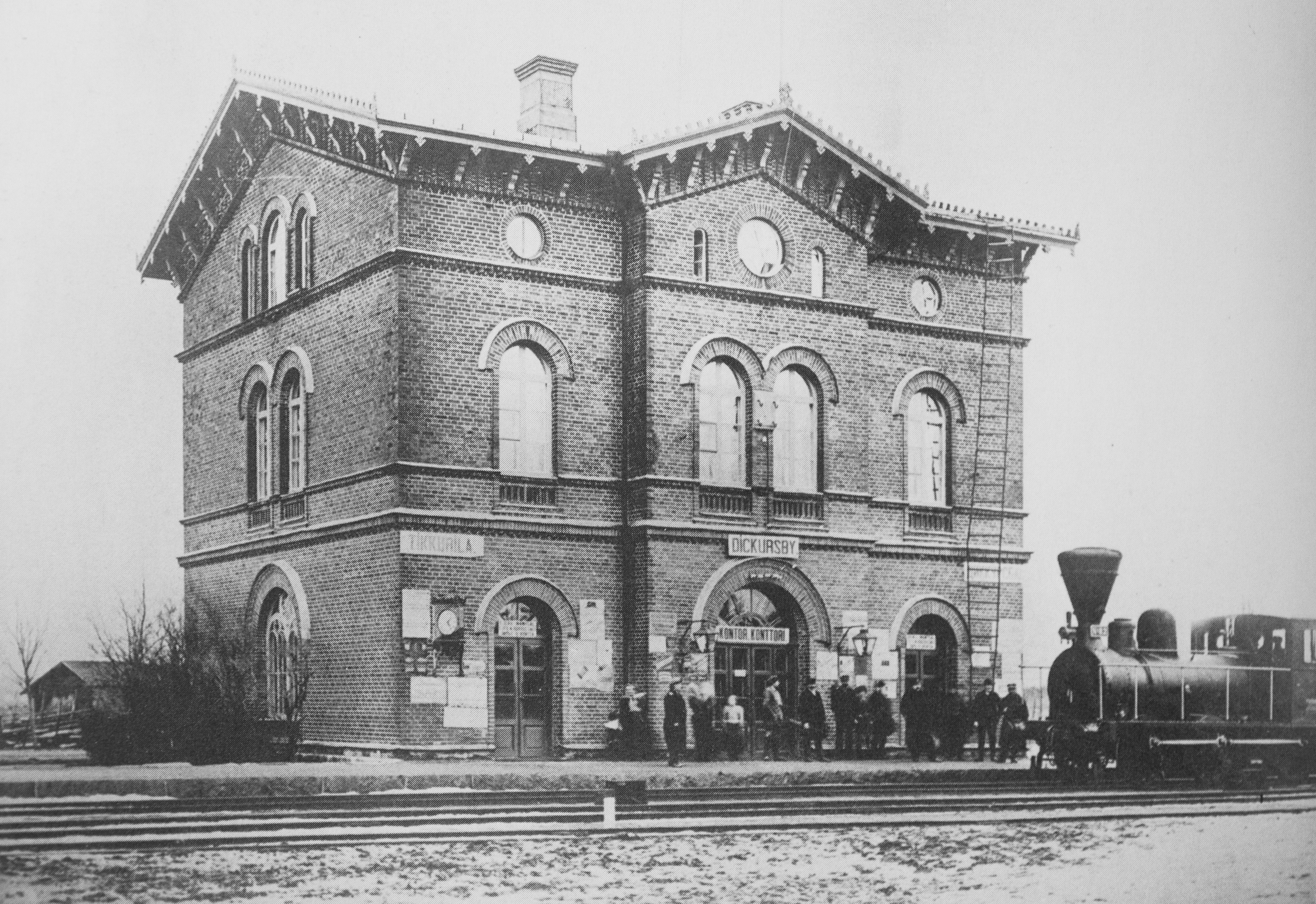
The old station building of Tikkurila

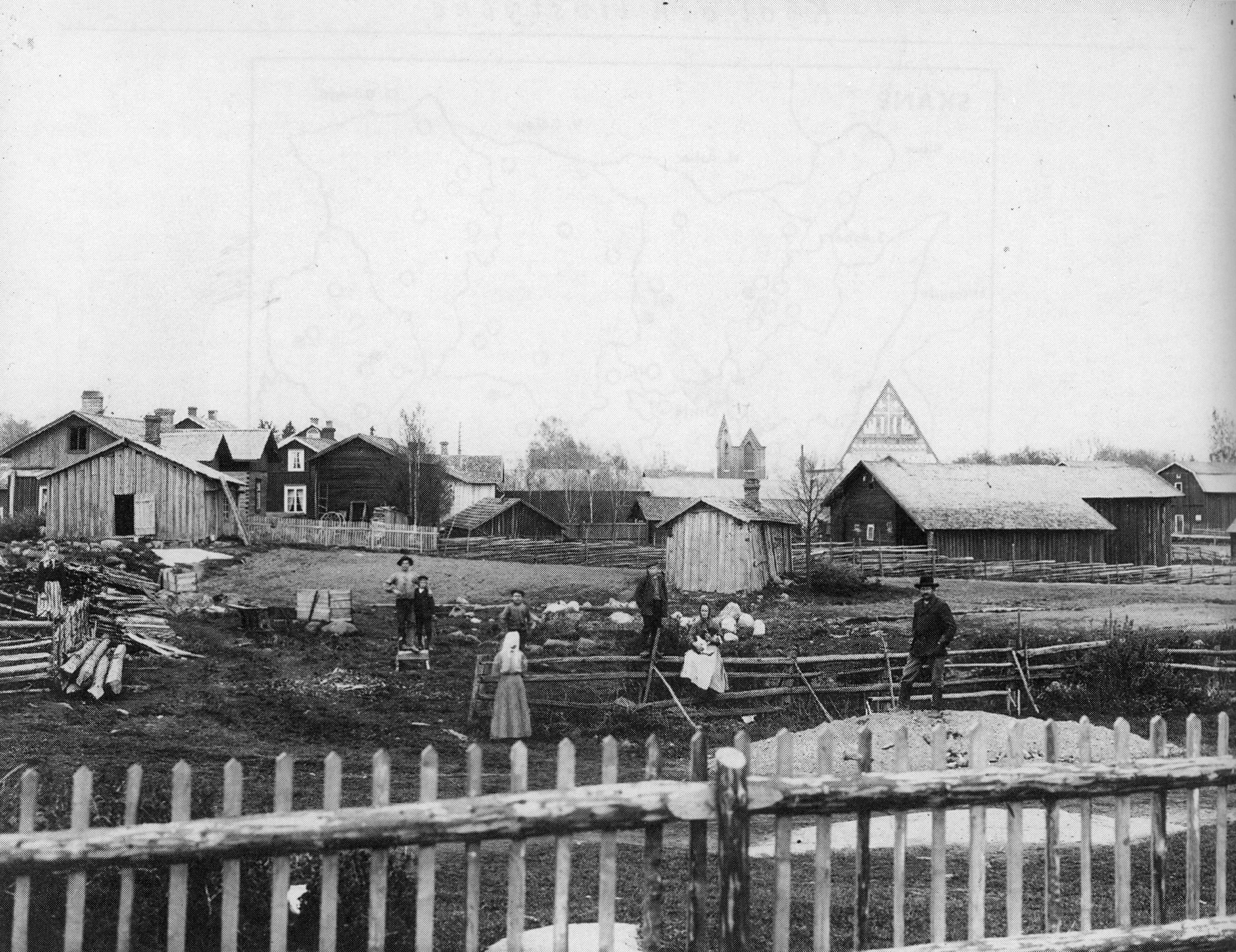
The historical parish of Helsingin Pitäjä in the late 1800s

Ore deposits in Helsingin pitäjä had been discovered in the 1700s, but weren't utilized until Finland transferred to Russian control in the early 1800s. Ore extraction and processing lead to rapid industrialization in the area, with communities forming around locations like Tikkurila and Kerava. The industrial community in Tikkurila included an expeller pressing plant, which currently operates in the area as the paint manufacturer Tikkurila Oyj.

The capital of autonomous Finland was moved from Turku to Helsinki in the early 1800s and Helsingin pitäjä fell behind the growing population development of Helsinki proper. Helsingin pitäjä gained municipality rights in 1865 because of the first municipal law enacted in Finland, after which it was named Helsingin maalaiskunta/Helsinge kommun ("Rural Municipality of Helsinki"). In 1805 Helsingin pitäjä had 4840 inhabitants, Sveaborg had 4606 and Helsinki had 4337. After six decades Helsingin pitäjä had about 7000 inhabitants while Helsinki already had 23,000.

The parish assembly meeting in 1823 established the general order, which specified crimes and punishments they resulted in. One of the reasons the general order was made was the increase of rootless vagabonds in the society. The parish assembly meeting and participation of citizens in keeping up the order was needed, because the state officials failed to keep the poor-mannered part of the people under control. Crimes not resulting in a court session were handled in the parish assembly meeting by announcement from the fief holder.

Interest towards a people's education increased in the early 19th century, when basic education still mostly depended on home tuition. By a suggestion from vicar Erik Crohns, a school was founded in Kirkonkylä in 1825 and a school master was hired.

The year 1865 is considered a significant year in the history of Vantaa, as municipal rule in Finland was established in that year and Helsingin pitäjä became Helsingin maalaiskunta, the rural municipality of Helsinki. This also led to the congregation regaining its position as an independent vicar area. The railway centre of Malmi became the administrative centre of the rural municipality.

In 1862, the railway between Helsinki and Hämeenlinna was constructed, and one of its seven stations was built in Tikkurila, on its intersection with King's Road. The Swedish architect Carl Albert Edelfelt designed a Renaissance Revival styled station building, which is the oldest extant station building in Finland and (as of 1978) has been adapted into the Vantaa City Museum. The old station building in Tikkurila is the only brick station building in Finland preserved in its original state. The building was designed by the provincial architect of the Häme Province, Carl Albert Edelfelt (1818-1869). The railway brought industry and induced population growth.

The Finnish famine of 1866–1868 decreased the population of Vantaa by 1300 people, and population growth was very slow for a whole decade. Only in the late 1870s Vantaa regained its population from 1865. The elementary school in Kirkonkylä was founded on 15 September 1869, four years later than originally planned. There were two teachers, one for boys and one for girls.

Four important roads passed through Helsingin pitäjä in the late 19th century: Hämeentie, the King's Road, Nurmijärventie and Porvoontie. To the north of Kirkonkylä, Hämeentie leading north crossed the King's Road. The King's Road connected Turku with Vyborg and Saint Petersburg. The King's Road, leading northwest, started from Helsinki as an extension of Läntinen Viertotie (now known as Mannerheimintie). Porvoontie connected Hämeentie and the King's Road separating from Hämeentie between Viikki and Malminkylä and connecting to the King's Road in eastern Hakkila.

The largest industrial facility in Helsingin maalaiskunta in the late 19th century was the Arabia porcelain factory. Its production value was greater than that of all the other factories in the municipality put together. The factory was active in the village of Koskela, to the north of Helsinki, and was named after the villa Arabia previously located at the site of the factory.

The growing city of Helsinki needed large amounts of building materials, brought from Uusimaa and Tavastia. Brick factories in Helsingin maalaiskunta were located in Tikkurila, Lauttasaari and Kulosaari.

A brewery founded by J. K. Kröckell was active in Pitäjänmäki, producing several styles of beer, sparkling wine, lemon-flavoured mead and a type of alcohol-free juice called Sorbus. The brewery horses carried malt products both to Helsinki and to the nearby railway station, continuing all the way to Tampere. The Pitäjänmäki brewery remained in action until 1914.

In 1899, an edict about tightly populated communities came into force in Finland. During the next couple of decades, almost twenty tightly populated communities were founded in the area of Helsingin maalaiskunta. Of these, Huopalahti separated into its own municipality in 1920, Oulunkylä in 1921 and Kulosaari in 1922. With the exception of Tikkurila, all these communities were discontinued in early 1946 as they were annexed to the city of Helsinki. The tightly populated community of Tikkurila was discontinued together with the rest of the tightly populated communities in Finland in early 1956.

=== 20th century to today ===
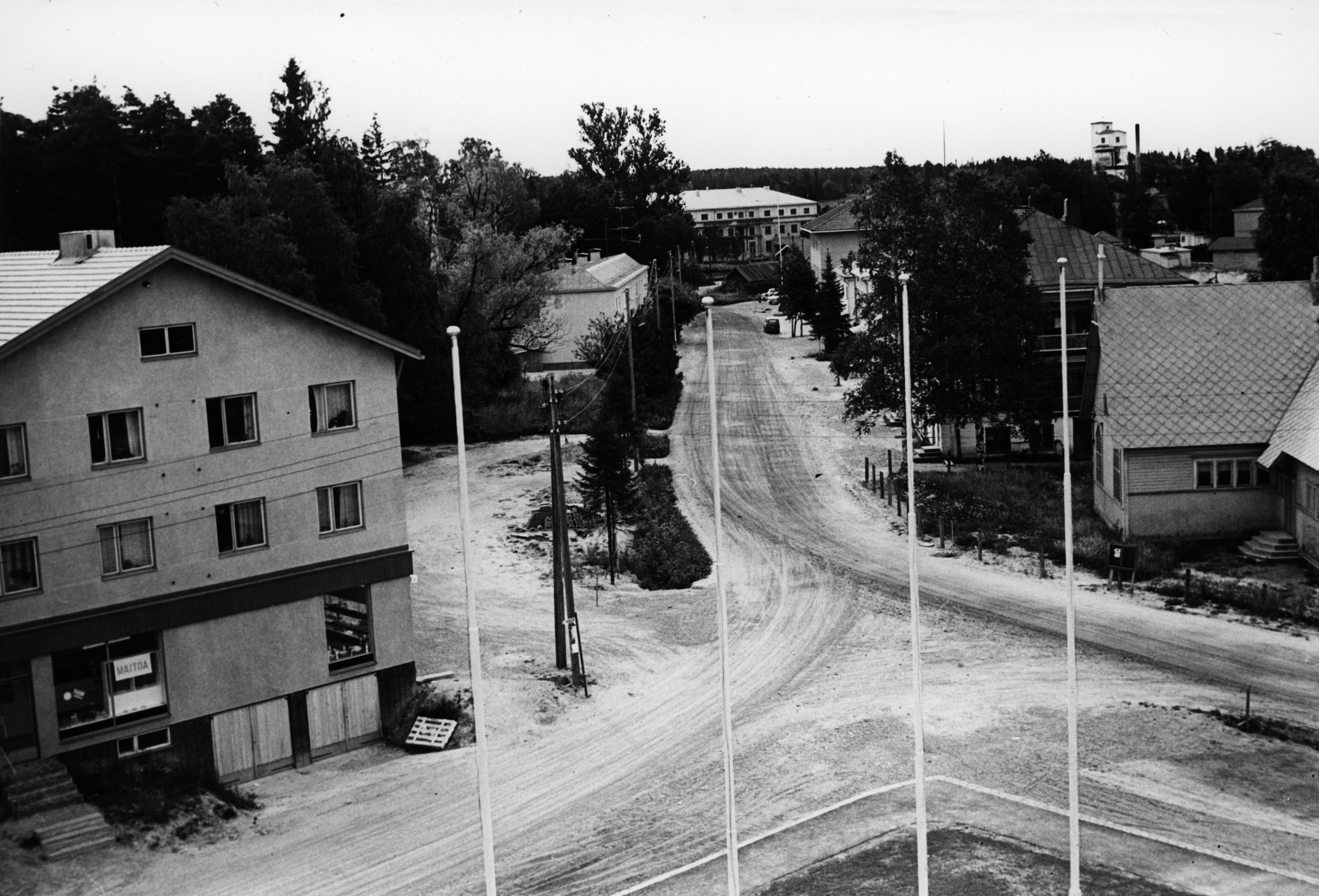
Tikkurila along the Asematie street in 1957.

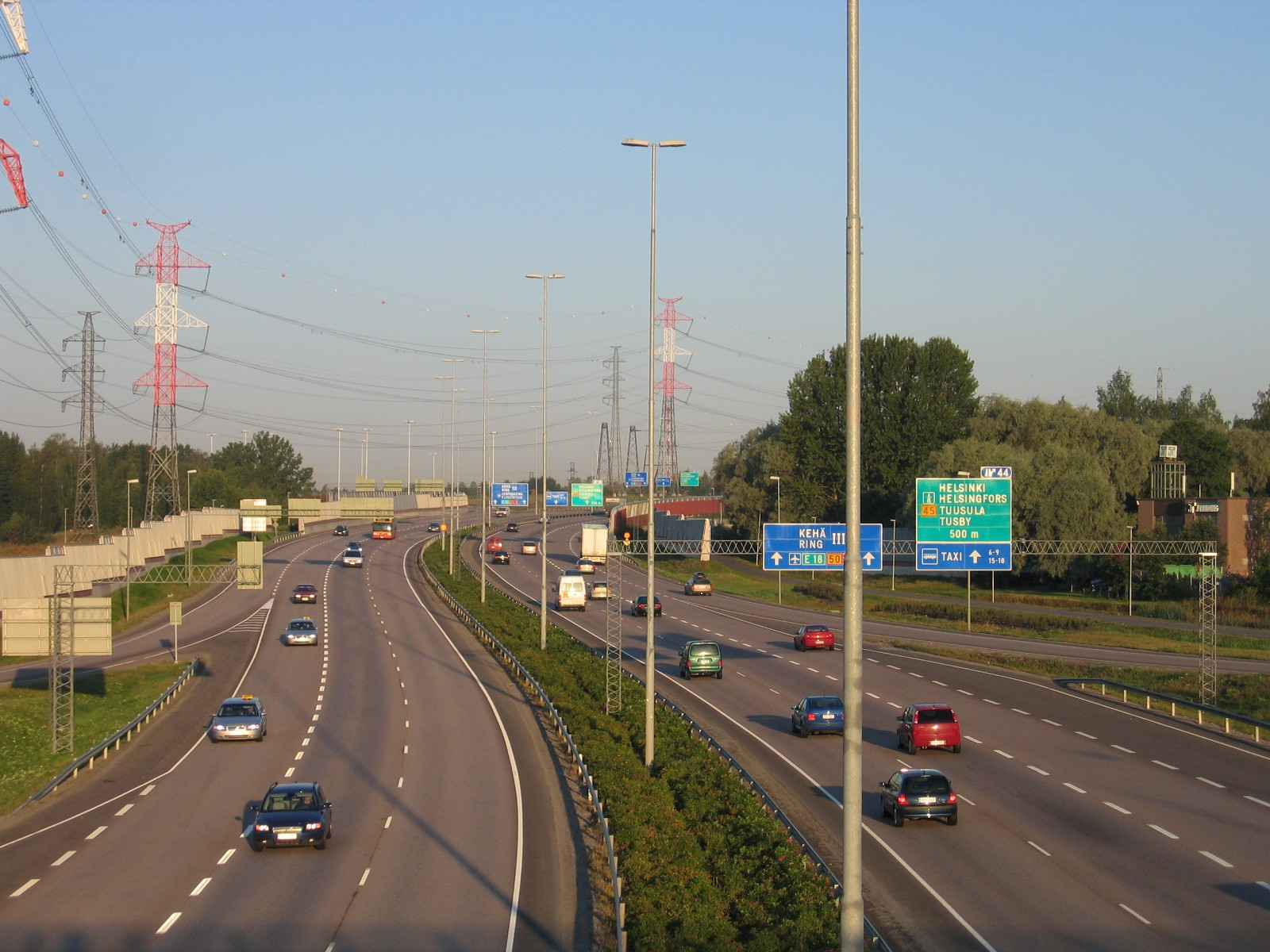
A view of the Ring III beltway near the connection to Kirkonkylä at the intersection to Finnish national road 45, the largest intersection in Finland.

Electricity started replacing steam as an industrial power source in Helsingin maalaiskunta before World War I. The power station Oy Malmin Sähkölaitos Ab was founded in 1910, and another power station was founded in Oulunkylä in the following year. Malmin sähkölaitos, which had reached a central position, bought a lot from Tapanila for its new power plant. Construction of the power plant and distribution grid, led by Gottfried Strömberg, was finished by the end of the year 1910.

The Helsinki-Malmi Airport was built at Tattarinsuo in the Malmi area of Helsingin maalaiskunta in 1936. The soil in the area was very watery and converting it to an airfield was difficult. The airport was taken into use in December 1936. Before this, air traffic in Helsinki had been served by the Santahamina Airport in Santahamina, which was also part of Helsingin maalaiskunta at the time.

During the great annexation of 1946 the municipalities of Huopalahti, Oulunkylä and Kulosaari as well as about a third of the area of Helsingin maalaiskunta were annexed to the city of Helsinki. The rural municipality lost two thirds of its population, including Malmi and Pitäjänmäki. In 1954 some of the areas of Korso in Tuusula and Kerava were annexed to the rural municipality of Helsinki, as well as a small part of Tuusula in 1959. Vuosaari was annexed to Helsinki in 1966.

The population development of Helsingin maalaiskunta grew rapidly after World War II. Tikkurila became the new municipal centre in the 1950s. New residential areas consisting mainly of detached houses developed among the main roads and new suburban centres developed along the railways running through the area, such as Rekola, Korso and Koivukylä.

In 1952, the new international airport of Helsinki opened in Helsingin maalaiskunta for the 1952 Summer Olympics, leading to the rural municipality becoming an important transport hub. The new airport split the municipality in half and brought large amounts of traffic and industry to its surroundings. The airport has become a significant part of the cityscape of Vantaa, and even today Vantaa is known abroad as an aviation city.

Because of World War II, many new urban areas had been born in Vantaa already in the 1940s, populated mainly by evacuees from Finnish Karelia and frontline soldiers, as well as Helsinkians seeking a less densely populated area to live in. The first apartment building groups were built in Tikkurila, Satomäki and Vaarala in the 1950s, after which rural flight sped up construction of apartment buildings. In the record year 1970, the population of Vantaa grew by ten thousand people.

The Keimola Motor Stadium was built in 1966 along Finnish National Road 3, opposite the residential area of Kivistö, and remained in operation until 1978. Construction of the new Keimolanmäki residential area in place of the former race track started in the 2010s.

In the early 20th century, the majority of the population of Helsingin maalaiskunta was Swedish-speaking. Afterwards, the rapid increase in the population has brought much more primarily Finnish-speaking population to the city, and today only 3.1 percent of the population in Vantaa are Swedish-speaking.

The roads in Finland were widened in the 1960s and 1970s, and the Ring III beltway was built to connect five national roads with each other. Myyrmäki became a second centre in the area after the construction of the Martinlaakso railway, which also sped up development in southwestern Vantaa. New residential suburbs were born along the main railway in the 1960s to 1980s, sped up by rural flight. Areas left outside the main traffic connections, such as Seutula in the west and Sotunki in the east, were left mainly unbuilt and rural-oriented.

In 1972, the municipality was renamed Vantaa (Swedish: Vanda) and promoted to a kauppala (market town) (i.e. Vantaan kauppala/Vanda köping). In 1974, the town got full city rights as Vantaan kaupunki/Vanda stad or "City of Vantaa". The name "Vantaa" comes from the river Vantaa running through the city, along which settlement in the Vantaa area was originally centred. The 650th anniversary of Vantaa was celebrated in 2001.

The city grew rapidly starting from 1960s and a railway line was built to the western side of the city in 1970s.

Since the days of the rural municipality, Vantaa has rapidly developed to its current form because of rural flight and good traffic connections. Like the neighbouring city of Espoo, Vantaa has many suburban commuter towns and lacks a specific city centre. The Helsinki Airport, the busiest airport in Finland by far, is located in central Vantaa.

In 2015, an extension to the existing railway line, the Ring Rail Line opened, providing service to the airport and new residential and working districts. Along the ring road, new residential were constructed. The largest of these developments is the Kivistö suburb followed by the residential districts of Leinelä and Aviapolis. The Ring Rail Line connects the Vantaankoski railway to the Finnish Main Line via the Helsinki Airport at Hiekkaharju.

The annual Beer floating summer event started in Vantaa in 1997. On 11 October 2002, an explosion took place in the Myyrmanni shopping centre in Myyrmäki. Negotiations to resolve the Aceh conflict, led by former President of Finland Martti Ahtisaari, were held in the Köningstedt Manor in Vantaa in early 2005.

To connect the municipality on the west–east, a new tramway is planned to open in 2030. This tramway will run from the Helsinki-Vantaa airport through districts of Pakkala, Aviapolis and Koivuhaka to the administrative centre of Tikkurila and further onward to Hakkila and Länsimäki in the east. The tram will also provide a link to the Helsinki metro at Mellunmäki station. This tramline will be the first tram in Vantaa.

== Geography ==
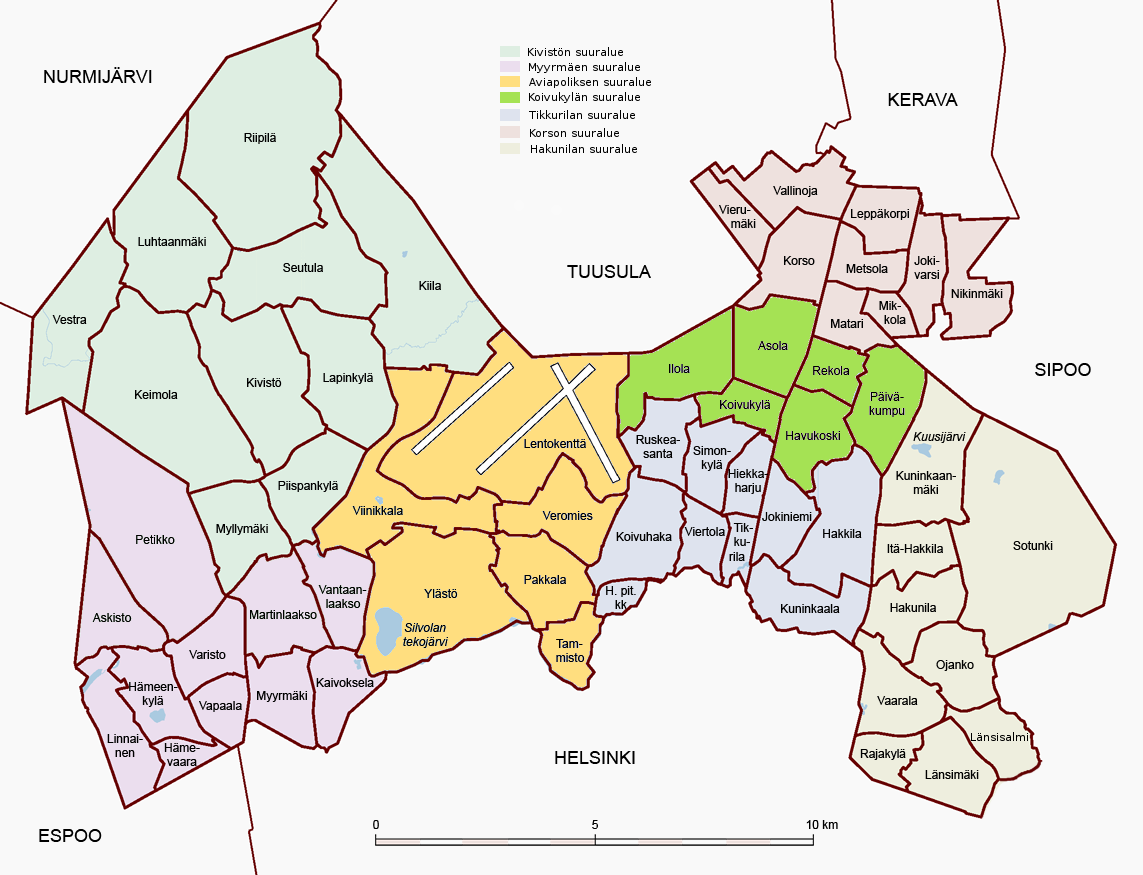
The districts and major regions of Vantaa

Vantaa is located in southern Finland, in the region of Uusimaa and the Helsinki sub-region. It is separated from the Gulf of Finland by Helsinki. Prior to the abolition of Finnish provinces in 2009, Vantaa was a part of the Southern Finland Province.

The city borders Helsinki, the Finnish capital, which is to the south and southwest. Other neighbouring municipalities are Espoo to the west; Nurmijärvi, Kerava, and Tuusula to the north; and Sipoo to the east. Vantaa is a part of the Finnish Capital Region, which is the inner core of the Helsinki capital region.

=== Subdivision ===
Vantaa is divided into seven major regions (Finnish: suuralueet, Swedish: storområden): Tikkurila (Dickursby), Hakunila (Håkansböle), Koivukylä (Björkby), Korso, Aviapolis, Myyrmäki (Myrbacka), and Kivistö. These major regions are then divided into a total of 60 city districts, the most populated of which are Myyrmäki, Martinlaakso, Hakunila, and Pakkala.

=== Features ===
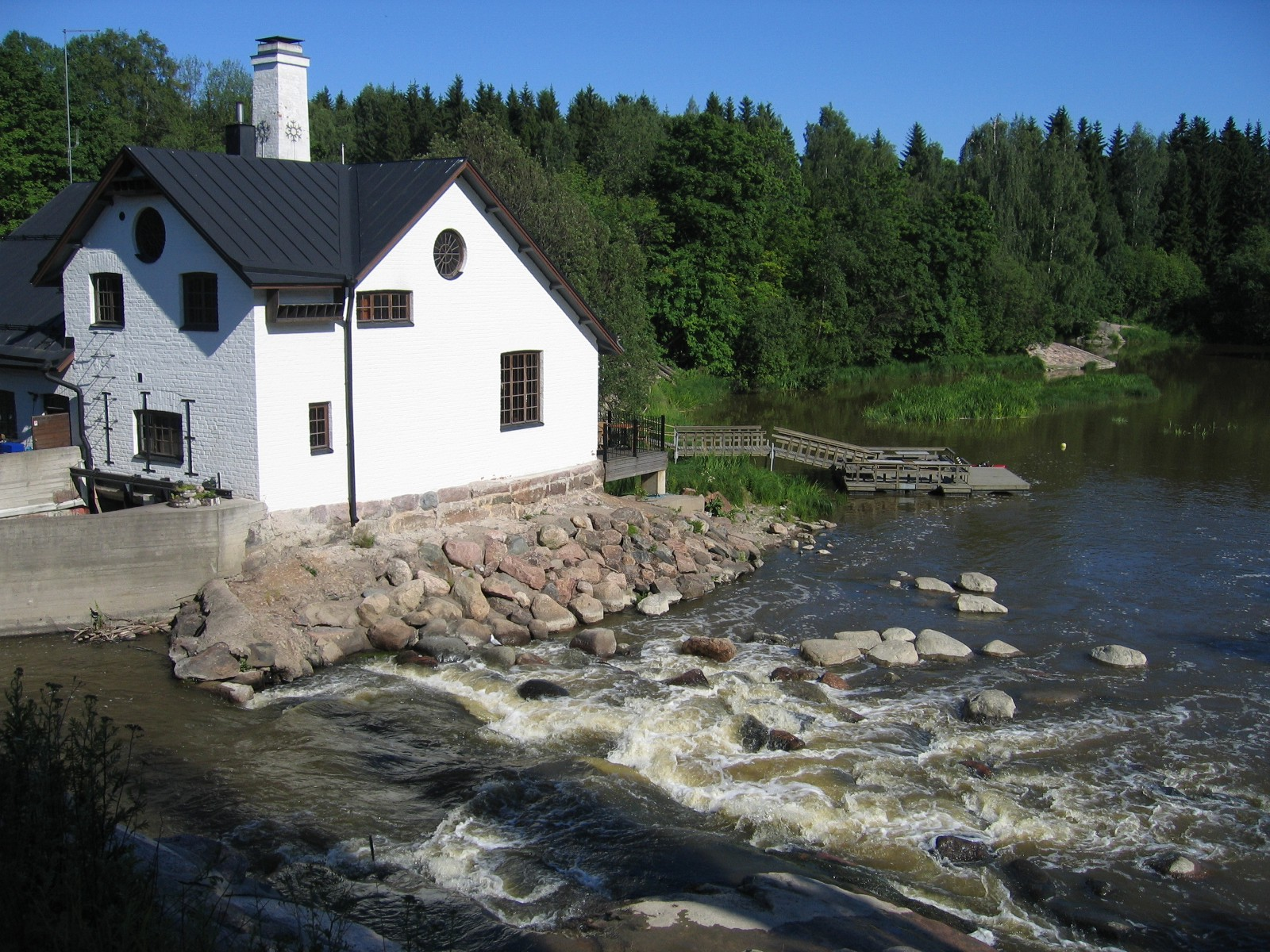
Rapids of river Vantaa

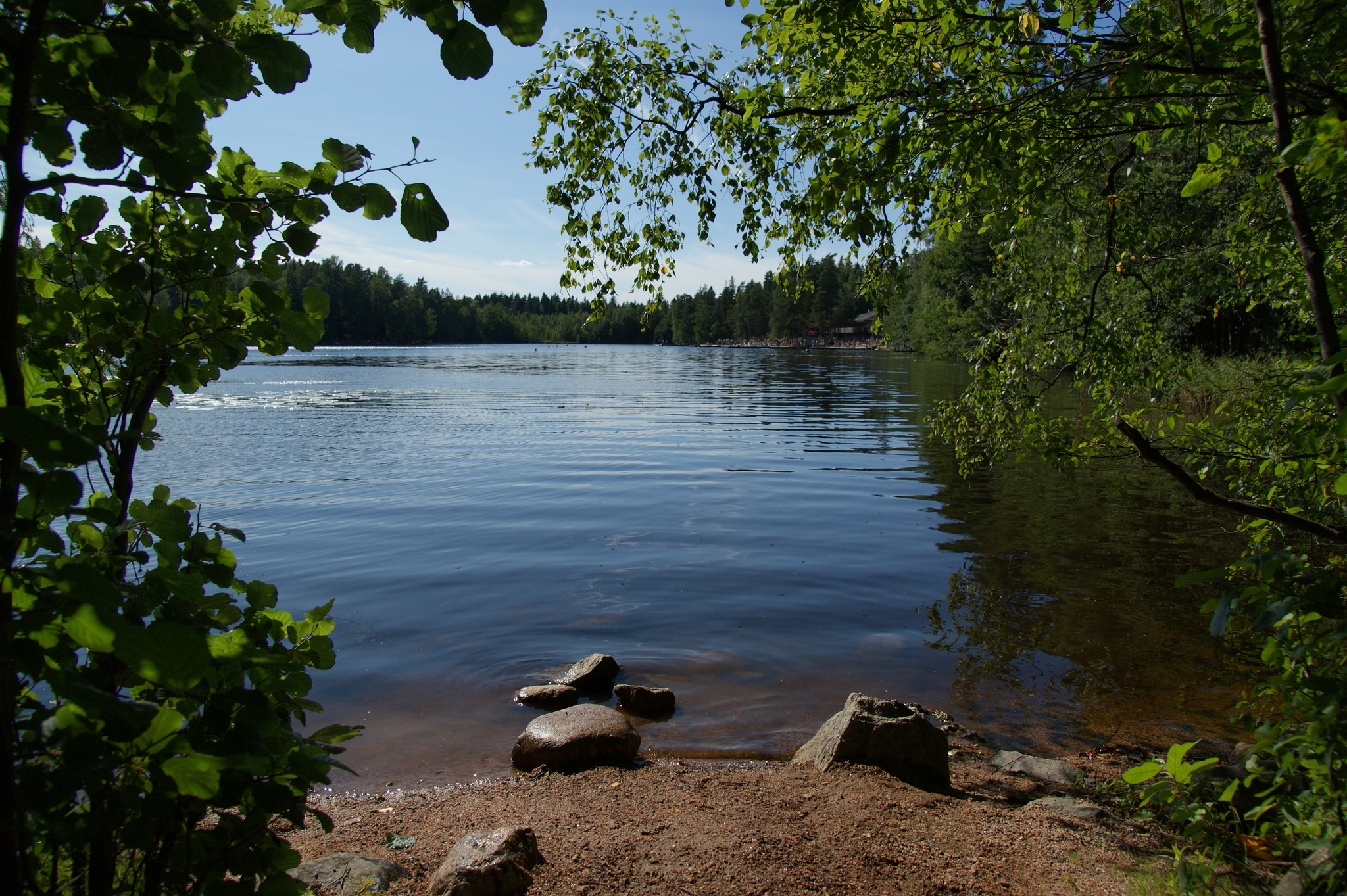
Kuusijärvi is a popular recreational area in summertime.

Vantaa consists mostly of lowlands cut up by rivers. According to a survey done by the National Land Survey of Finland on 1 January 2022, Vantaa encompasses 240.35 square kilometres (92.80 sq mi), of which 1.97 km^{2} (0.76 sq mi) is water. The city is mostly suburban and urban area with some rural landscape, notably in the districts of Sotunki and Seutula. Average population density is 1,061.15/km^{2} (2,748.4/sq mi), which rises above 5,000 inhabitants per square kilometre (13,000/sq mi) in concentrated urban districts like Myyrmäki and Tikkurila.

The river Vantaa runs through western Vantaa, and its tributary Keravanjoki runs through eastern Vantaa. In 1966, the rural municipality of Helsinki (now known as Vantaa) lost the district of Vuosaari to Helsinki proper, cutting it almost completely off from the sea. Up to 2008, Vantaa still reached the seashore at its southeastern corner at the Porvarinlahti bay, until the "Västerkulla wedge" with its seashore was annexed into Helsinki together with part of Sipoo in 2009. Thus Vantaa formally became the second largest inland city in the Nordic countries after Tampere.

For its area, Vantaa has relatively few lakes. The city encompasses two natural lakes: Kuusijärvi in Kuninkaanmäki and Lammaslampi Pähkinärinne, Hämeenkylä. In addition to these, there is an artificial lake, Silvolan tekojärvi. Vantaa shares two lakes with Espoo: Odilampi and Pitkäjärvi. Of the lakes in the Sipoonkorpi National Park, Bisajärvi and most of Gumböle träsk are located in Vantaa. Ponds formed in sand pits include Vetokannas, renovated into a swimming beach and the Vaaralanlammet ponds in Vaarala.

The easternmost districts of Vantaa, Rajakylä and Länsimäki, are located right next to the border to Helsinki and are connected to the Helsinki districts of Vesala and Mellunmäki. Part of the turnstile of the Mellunmäki metro station is located in Vantaa.

Vantaa exhibits frequent exposed granite bedrock ground, which is common in Finland. Resulting from erosion in the last glacial period (about 10,000 years ago), elevated surfaces often lack soil (superficial deposits), revealing bare stone unsuitable for most plant life. Other geological impacts of the last Ice Age include a series of eskers running through central Vantaa, which is one of the best sources of groundwater in the city. After the glacial period, most of the area of the current city of Vantaa was underwater except for the highest hills. As the land rose, bays stretching far inland were left behind, along with the river Vantaa, which changed its discharge from Mätäoja to Keravanjoki about two millennia ago. The bays flushed against the hills leaving shore formations still visibile today. They also formed flat deposits of clay at the bottom, which now form valleys especially along the rivers.

=== Flora ===
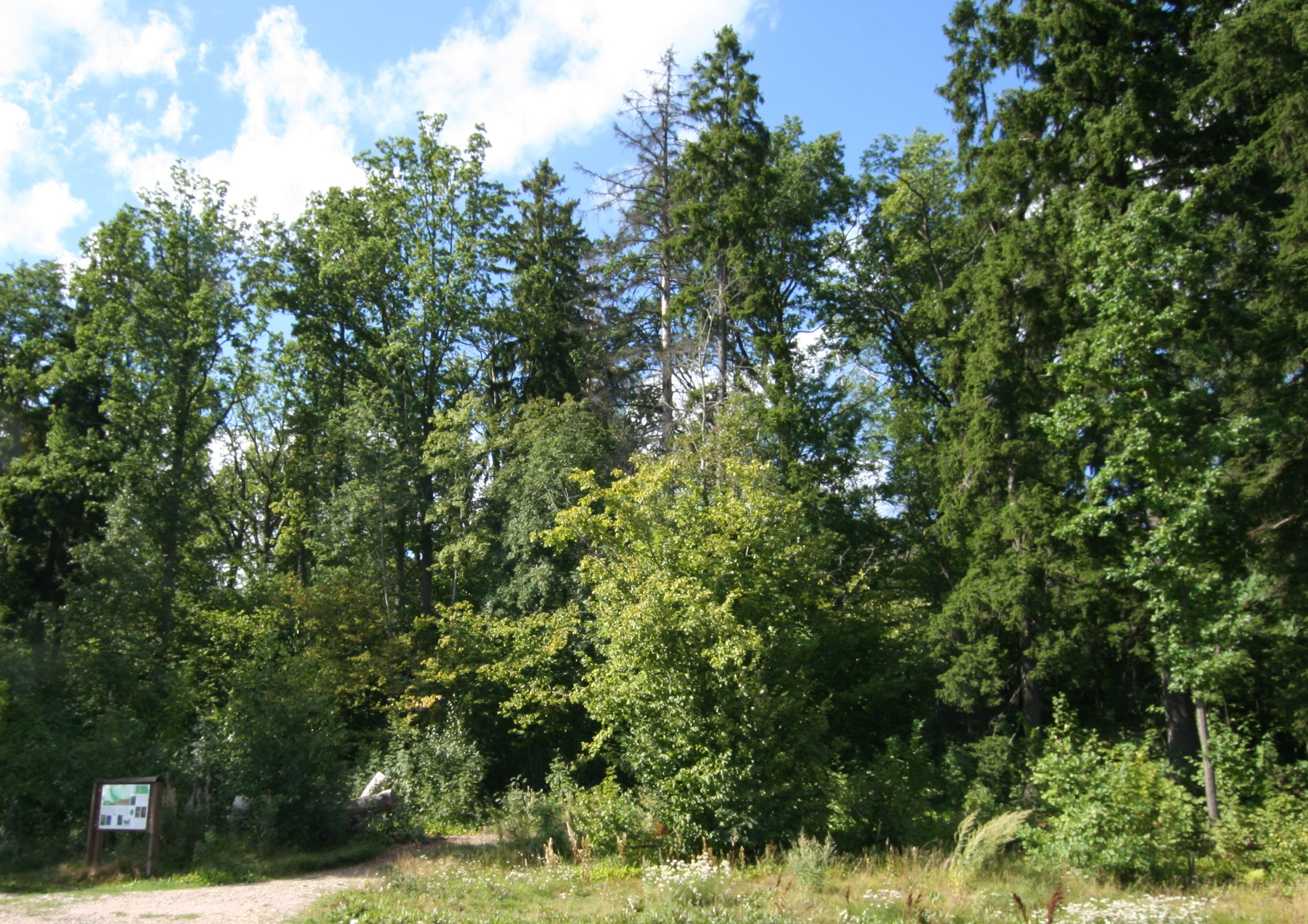
Tammisto forest nature reserve

Vantaa belongs to the taiga zone and its flora represents the southern parts of the zone. Vantaa is located at the border between the southern boreal zone characteristic of inland southern Finland and the hemiboreal subzone characteristic of southwestern Finland.

The hemiboreal subzone is a transition subzone between coniferous and deciduous forests, and deciduous trees growing naturally in the subzone include oaks and elms. The river valleys running through Vantaa have previously been full of lush groves, but today most of them are farmed land. However, at some places they are connected to lush mixed forests, transitioning into shadowy spruce forests at some places.

There are prominent alder meadows along the river Mätäoja, which are home to various rare insect and plant species. The most common type of forest in Vantaa is a blueberry conifer forest with spruce and birch trees, whereas dry forests are only located at bare cliff areas.

The second most common forest type in Vantaa is the more lush grove-like forest. Its undergrowth includes blueberry, wood sorrel, herb Paris and lady fern, as well as wood anemone at some places.

There are lush groves growing mosaically among the forests, containing common southern grove plants such as the liverwort. The groves in Vantaa vary greatly, ranging from moist and shady spruce groves growing ostrich fern to dry groves growing liverwort and common hazel and hardwood groves. In springtime during the first weeks of May the wood anemone flowers very noticeably in almost all groves and grove-like forests, which is characteristic to the forest growth in southwestern and southern Finland.

There is a centuries-old oak forest in the district of Tammisto, which is considered to be the only natural oak forest in the Finnish capital area. The forest has been protected under the nature preservation law in 1946.

Although Vantaa is a very urbanised area, a great deal of its surface area still remains as rural fields or forest. The city of Vantaa contains 12.41 square kilometres of nature preserved area (about 5% of the surface area of the city). The first nature preserve area in Vantaa was founded in 1946 in Tammisto. There are two especially protected species in the nature preserve areas in Vantaa, the beetle species Hylochares cruentatus and the orchid species Malaxis monophyllos.

=== Climate ===
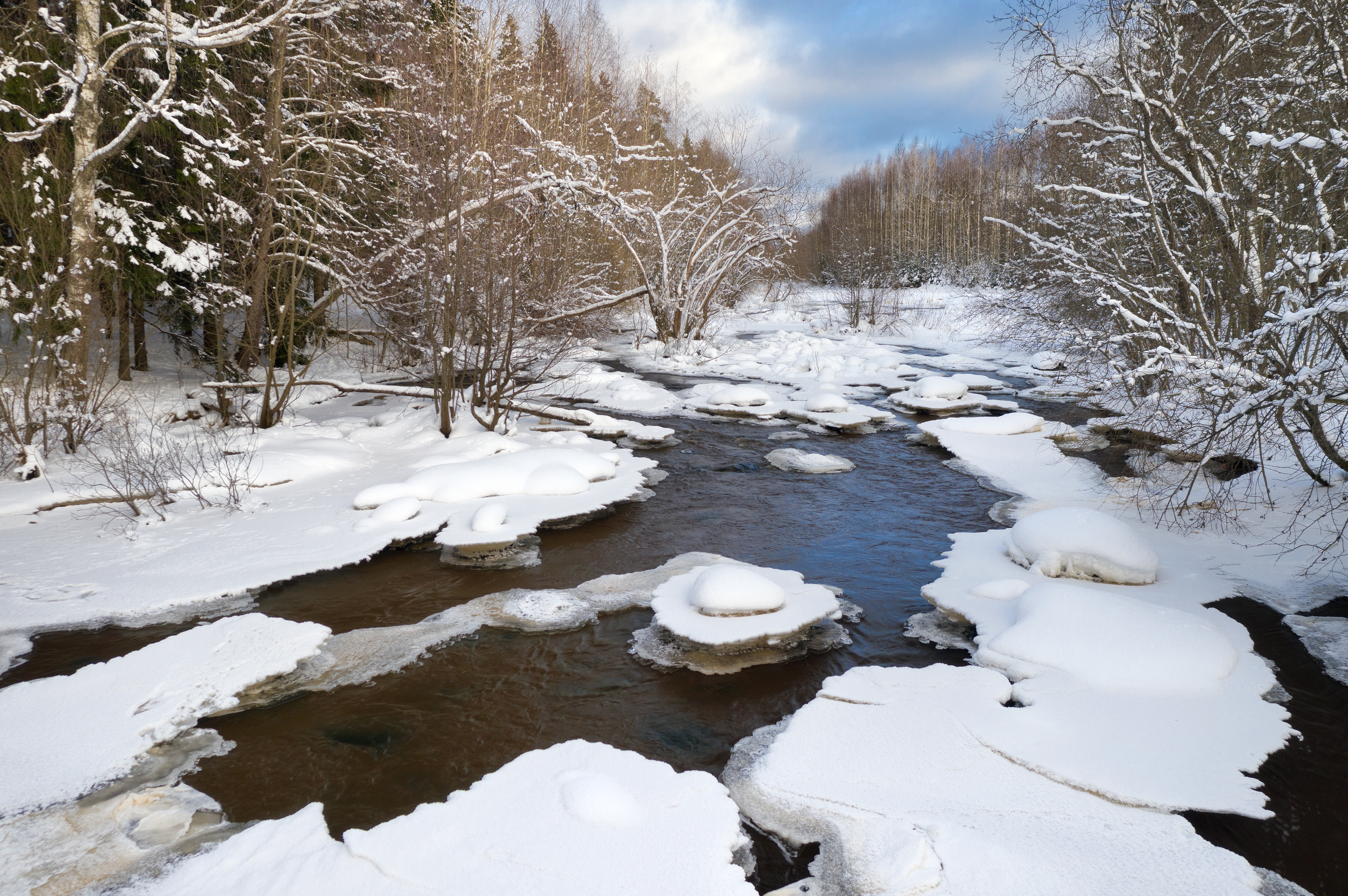
The Matarinkoski rapids area in winter.

Vantaa has a humid continental climate (Köppen: Dfb). The city has four distinct seasons, the amount of precipitation is relatively uniform throughout the year. The driest season is spring. Summers are generally relatively warm and winters are cold. Although the city does not have a coastline along the Baltic Sea, it is close enough to experience the mitigating influence of the sea and the Gulf Stream. The record low temperature in Vantaa is −35.9 °C (−32.6 °F) and the record high temperature is 34.0 °C (93.2 °F).

Climate data for Helsinki Airport (Vantaa) 1991–2020 normals, records 1952–present
| Month | Jan | Feb | Mar | Apr | May | Jun | Jul | Aug | Sep | Oct | Nov | Dec | Year |
|---|---|---|---|---|---|---|---|---|---|---|---|---|---|
| Record high °C (°F) | 8.2 (46.8) | 10.0 (50.0) | 17.5 (63.5) | 24.0 (75.2) | 29.6 (85.3) | 31.7 (89.1) | 33.7 (92.7) | 31.5 (88.7) | 27.7 (81.9) | 18.2 (64.8) | 13.7 (56.7) | 10.8 (51.4) | 33.7 (92.7) |
| Mean maximum °C (°F) | 4.3 (39.7) | 4.2 (39.6) | 9.3 (48.7) | 18.1 (64.6) | 24.9 (76.8) | 26.6 (79.9) | 28.7 (83.7) | 27.2 (81.0) | 21.6 (70.9) | 14.8 (58.6) | 9.1 (48.4) | 5.4 (41.7) | 29.7 (85.5) |
| Mean daily maximum °C (°F) | −1.8 (28.8) | −2 (28) | 2.2 (36.0) | 9.1 (48.4) | 16.0 (60.8) | 20.1 (68.2) | 23.0 (73.4) | 21.2 (70.2) | 15.7 (60.3) | 8.6 (47.5) | 3.4 (38.1) | 0.4 (32.7) | 9.7 (49.5) |
| Daily mean °C (°F) | −4.3 (24.3) | −4.9 (23.2) | −1.4 (29.5) | 4.5 (40.1) | 10.9 (51.6) | 15.3 (59.5) | 18.3 (64.9) | 16.6 (61.9) | 11.6 (52.9) | 5.8 (42.4) | 1.4 (34.5) | −1.9 (28.6) | 6.0 (42.8) |
| Mean daily minimum °C (°F) | −7.1 (19.2) | −7.9 (17.8) | −5 (23) | 0.1 (32.2) | 5.3 (41.5) | 10.2 (50.4) | 13.3 (55.9) | 12.0 (53.6) | 7.7 (45.9) | 2.8 (37.0) | −1 (30) | −4.4 (24.1) | 2.2 (36.0) |
| Mean minimum °C (°F) | −20.5 (−4.9) | −19.9 (−3.8) | −14.8 (5.4) | −6.2 (20.8) | −1.2 (29.8) | 4.1 (39.4) | 8.6 (47.5) | 6.1 (43.0) | 0.4 (32.7) | −5.6 (21.9) | −10.0 (14.0) | −15.7 (3.7) | −23.9 (−11.0) |
| Record low °C (°F) | −35.9 (−32.6) | −33.3 (−27.9) | −27.2 (−17.0) | −16.9 (1.6) | −5.6 (21.9) | −0.6 (30.9) | 3.7 (38.7) | 0.4 (32.7) | −7.3 (18.9) | −14.5 (5.9) | −20.8 (−5.4) | −32.3 (−26.1) | −35.9 (−32.6) |
| Average precipitation mm (inches) | 54 (2.1) | 41 (1.6) | 34 (1.3) | 36 (1.4) | 39 (1.5) | 64 (2.5) | 64 (2.5) | 78 (3.1) | 62 (2.4) | 79 (3.1) | 70 (2.8) | 62 (2.4) | 683 (26.7) |
| Average rainy days (≥ 0.1 mm) | 24 | 21 | 16 | 12 | 12 | 14 | 13 | 15 | 15 | 18 | 21 | 24 | 205 |
| Average snowy days | 26.4 | 25.7 | 25.2 | 8.4 | 0.4 | 0.0 | 0.0 | 0.0 | 0.1 | 2.5 | 13.6 | 19.3 | 121.6 |
| Mean monthly sunshine hours | 38 | 74 | 131 | 196 | 275 | 266 | 291 | 219 | 143 | 84 | 37 | 26 | 1,780 |
| Percentage possible sunshine | 17 | 28 | 38 | 43 | 54 | 52 | 52 | 48 | 39 | 30 | 17 | 15 | 36 |
Source 1: FMI climatological normals for Finland 1991-2020, Weatheronline.co.uk
Source 2: record highs and lows

The coldest month of the year is in February, when the average temperature based on measurements from 1981 to 2010 was -5.8 degrees Celsius. After this, the temperatures rise rapidly. The average temperature in April for the same period is +4.0 degrees and the one in May is +10.5 degrees. The warmest month of the year is in July, when the average temperature is +17.7 degrees. The second warmest month is in August with an average temperature of +15.7 degrees and the third warmest is June with an average temperature of +14.7 degrees. The average number of hot weather days in Vantaa is 17, of which over half occur in July on average. In sporadic years hot weather can extend to September. The summer thunderstorm period in Vantaa is very short and varying: it typically starts around Midsummer and ends in middle August, peaking at the end of July.

The temperatures lower in autumn slower than they rise in spring. The average day temperature in November is +0.3 degrees and the one in December is -3.3 degrees. In autumn and early winter low pressure storm fronts move eastwards from the Atlantic Ocean passing over Vantaa. Vantaa's location in Fennoscandia warmed by the Gulf Stream near the coast of the Gulf of Finland makes Vantaa a clearly more temperate area than the average based on its latitude. For example, the southern tip of Greenland is located south of Vantaa, as are the tundra areas of the Labrador Peninsula. The period when Vantaa is normally covered in snow is typically from late December to early April, after which the snow rapidly melts away.

Spring in Vantaa experiences significantly less rain than autumn. The average monthly rainfall in February through May is only about 30 to 40 millimetres. In summer the weather becomes rainier, and the average monthly rainfall in July through November is 60 to 80 millimetres. The rainfall varies greatly throughout the year: in the late months of the year there are monthly rainfalls of less than 20 millimetres, as well as over 200 millimetres. Respectively, the weather becomes drier in the early months of the year. The total average rainfall in Vantaa in a year is 682.9 millimetres.

== Demographics ==
Historical population
| Year | Pop. | ±% |
|---|---|---|
| 1950 | 16,814 | — |
| 1960 | 43,843 | +160.8% |
| 1970 | 80,856 | +84.4% |
| 1980 | 132,050 | +63.3% |
| 1990 | 154,933 | +17.3% |
| 2000 | 178,471 | +15.2% |
| 2010 | 200,055 | +12.1% |
| 2020 | 237,231 | +18.6% |
Source: Doria, Statistics Finland

The city of Vantaa has 252,956 inhabitants, making it the 4th most populous municipality in Finland. The city of Vantaa is part of the Helsinki metropolitan area, which is the largest urban area in Finland with 1,623,283 inhabitants. The city of Vantaa is home to 4% of Finland's population. 30.6% of the population has a foreign background, which is three times higher than the national average.

In 2017, 69% of people aged 15 and over in Vantaa had completed higher education, meaning that 31% of the population had completed primary education at most. 38% had completed upper secondary education. Of the population with tertiary education (31%), 9% had the lowest degree, 12% had a lower degree and 9% had a higher degree.

The average income in Vantaa is lower than elsewhere in the Helsinki Metropolitan Area, but still higher than in the rest of Finland. On the other hand, housing in Vantaa is on average cheaper than in Helsinki and Espoo. Income levels in Vantaa vary widely due to differences between suburbs and single-family areas. On average, women in Vantaa earn about 71% of men's income, which is slightly higher than the Finnish average (69%). Many families with children live in Vantaa, accounting for about 55% of all households. Women make up 50.2% of the population of Vantaa.

Population size 1980–2025
| Year | Population |
|---|---|
| 1980 | 132,050 |
| 1985 | 143,844 |
| 1990 | 152,263 |
| 1995 | 166,480 |
| 2000 | 178,471 |
| 2005 | 187,281 |
| 2010 | 200,055 |
| 2015 | 211,206 |
| 2020 | 237,231 |
| 2025 | 252,956 |

=== Languages ===
Population by
mother tongue (2025)
1. Finnish (68.0%)
2. Russian (4.30%)
3. Estonian (3.30%)
4. Arabic (2.50%)
5. Swedish (2.10%)
6. Albanian (2.00%)
7. English (1.40%)
8. Somali (1.30%)
9. Other (15.2%)

The city of Vantaa is officially bilingual, with both Finnish and Swedish as official languages. The majority of the population, 68%, spoke Finnish as their first language. There are 5,272 Swedish speakers in Vantaa, or 2.1% of the population. This compares with 5.4% in Helsinki and 6.2% in Espoo. The number of Swedish speakers in Vantaa has remained more or less constant over the decades, but the proportion of Swedish speakers in the city has declined steadily as a result of immigration. In 1960, about ten per cent of the population of Vantaa spoke Swedish. In 1980, the proportion was about five per cent. Since the beginning of the 20th century, Vantaa has been a predominantly Finnish-speaking municipality.

Vantaa remains officially bilingual, as the Finnish Language Act states that a municipality must be declared bilingual if the number of speakers of the official minority language (Finnish or Swedish) is at least 8% of the population or 3,000 people. In relation to the total population, the proportion of Swedish speakers in Vantaa is the lowest of all bilingual municipalities in Finland. Among Vantaa's districts, the proportion of Swedish speakers was highest in Helsingin pitäjän kirkonkylä (19.0%), Sotunki (16.6%) and Luhtaanmäki (11.5%) in 2019.

The number of people who speak Sámi, Finland's third official language, is only 22 inhabitants. In Vantaa, 29.9% of the population speak a mother tongue other than Finnish or Swedish. As English and Swedish are compulsory school subjects, functional bilingualism or trilingualism acquired through language studies is not uncommon.

There are at least 100 different languages spoken in Vantaa. The most common foreign languages are Russian (4.3%), Estonian (3.3%), Arabic (2.5%), Albanian (2.0%), English (1.4%), Somali (1.3%), Persian (1.1%), Ukrainian (1.1%) and Vietnamese (1.0%).

=== Immigration ===
Population by country of birth (2025)
| Country of birth | Population | % |
| Finland | 188,466 | 74.5 |
| Soviet Union | 7,619 | 3.0 |
| Estonia | 8,194 | 3.2 |
| Iraq | 3,643 | 1.4 |
| Russia | 1,985 | 0.8 |
| Turkey | 1,497 | 0.6 |
| Iran | 1,550 | 0.6 |
| Somalia | 1,694 | 0.7 |
| China | 1,366 | 0.5 |
| Afghanistan | 1,460 | 0.6 |
| Other | 35,060 | 13.9 |

As of 2024, there were 73,487 people with a migrant background living in Vantaa, or 29% of the population. (Note: Statistics Finland classifies a person as having a "foreign background" if both parents or the only known parent were born abroad.) There were 61,603 residents who were born abroad, or 25% of the population. The number of foreign citizens living in Vantaa was 42,366.

Among the major Finnish cities, Vantaa has the highest proportion of immigrants – more than three times the national average. Moreover, the city's new residents are increasingly of foreign origin.

=== Religion ===
In 2023, the Evangelical Lutheran Church was the largest religious group with 47.0% of the population of Vantaa. Other religious groups accounted for 4.5% of the population. 48.6% of the population had no religious affiliation. The Finnish Orthodox Church had 1.2% of the population. The proportion of members of the Lutheran Church has steadily decreased in the 21st century, while the proportion of people with no religious affiliation has steadily increased.

==== Lutheran congregations ====
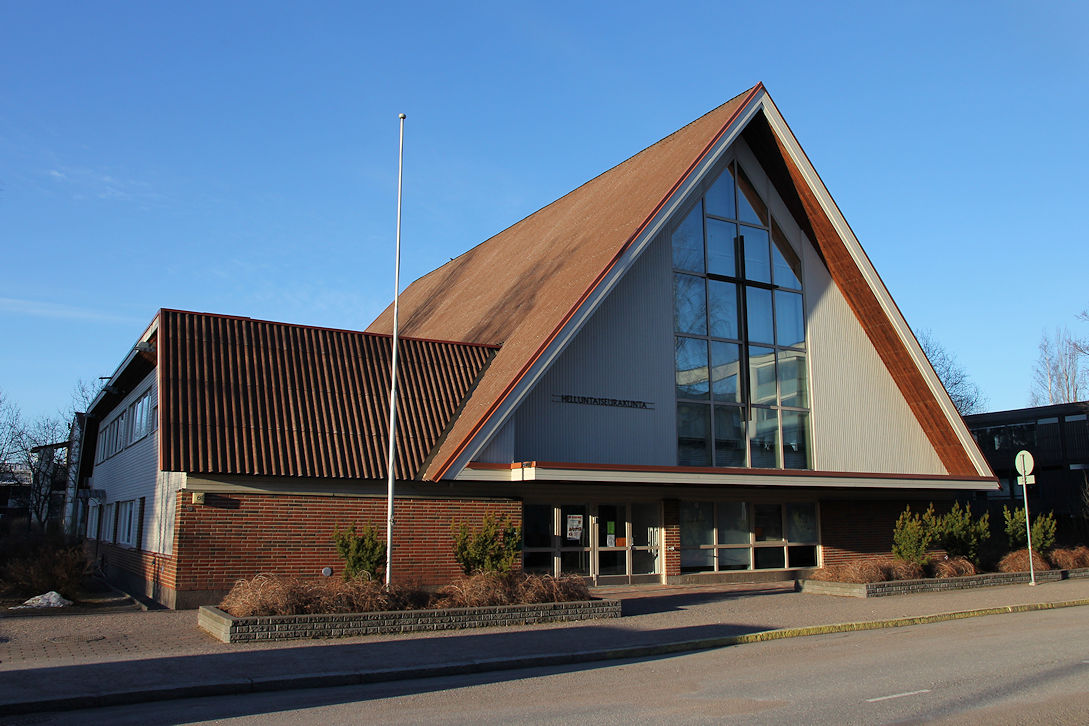
The Korso Pentecostal congregation in March 2017.

According to the 2018 division of Vantaa, the following congregations of the Evangelical Lutheran Church of Finland are located in Vantaa:

- Congregation of Hakunila
- Congregation of Hämeenkylä
- Congregation of Korso
- Congregation of Rekola
- Congregation of Tikkurila (formerly known as the Finnish-speaking congregation of Helsingin pitäjä)
- Congregation of Vantaankoski (formerly known as the congregation of Vantaa)
- Vanda svenska församling (formerly known as Helsinge svenska församling)

Together these congregations form the Union of congregations in Vantaa (Finnish: Vantaan seurakuntayhtymä, Swedish: Vanda kyrkliga samfällighet).

Since 2016 Vantaa has been home to the Lutheran congregation of the Holy Trinity belonging to the Evangelical Lutheran Mission Diocese of Finland.

==== Other congregations ====
Of the congregations of the Orthodox Church of Finland, the Orthodox congregation of Helsinki is active in Vantaa. The Tikkurila Orthodox Church is located near the Tikkurila sports park in Viertola

Of the member congregations of the Pentecostal Church of Finland, the Myyrmäki Pentecostal congregation, Vantaan Kotikirkko and Vantaan Minttukirkko are active in Vantaa. Independent Pentecostal congregations in Vantaa include the Credo church, the Korso Pentecostal congregation and Seutulan Betania.

The Vantaa free congregation, belonging to the Free Church of Finland, is located in Hiekkaharju, and the congregation has also founded the Free congregation of western Vantaa in Askisto in western Vantaa.

The Finnish branch office of the Jehovah's Witnesses, which is the highest level of the organisation in Finland, is located in Koivuhaka. There are two Kingdom Halls in Vantaa, in Koivuhaka and in Martinlaakso.

== Economy ==
=== Economy of the city of Vantaa ===
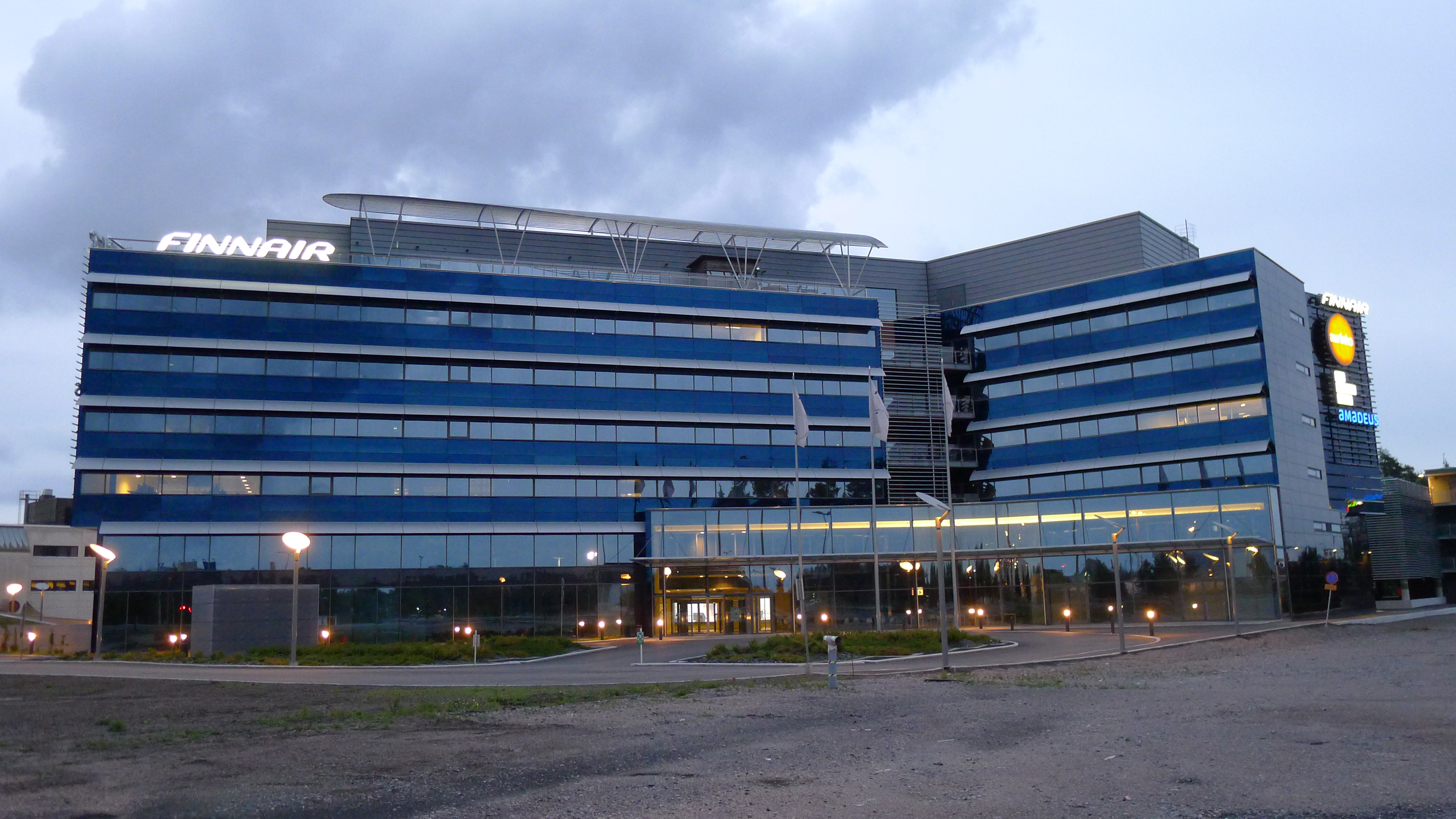
Finnair headquarters

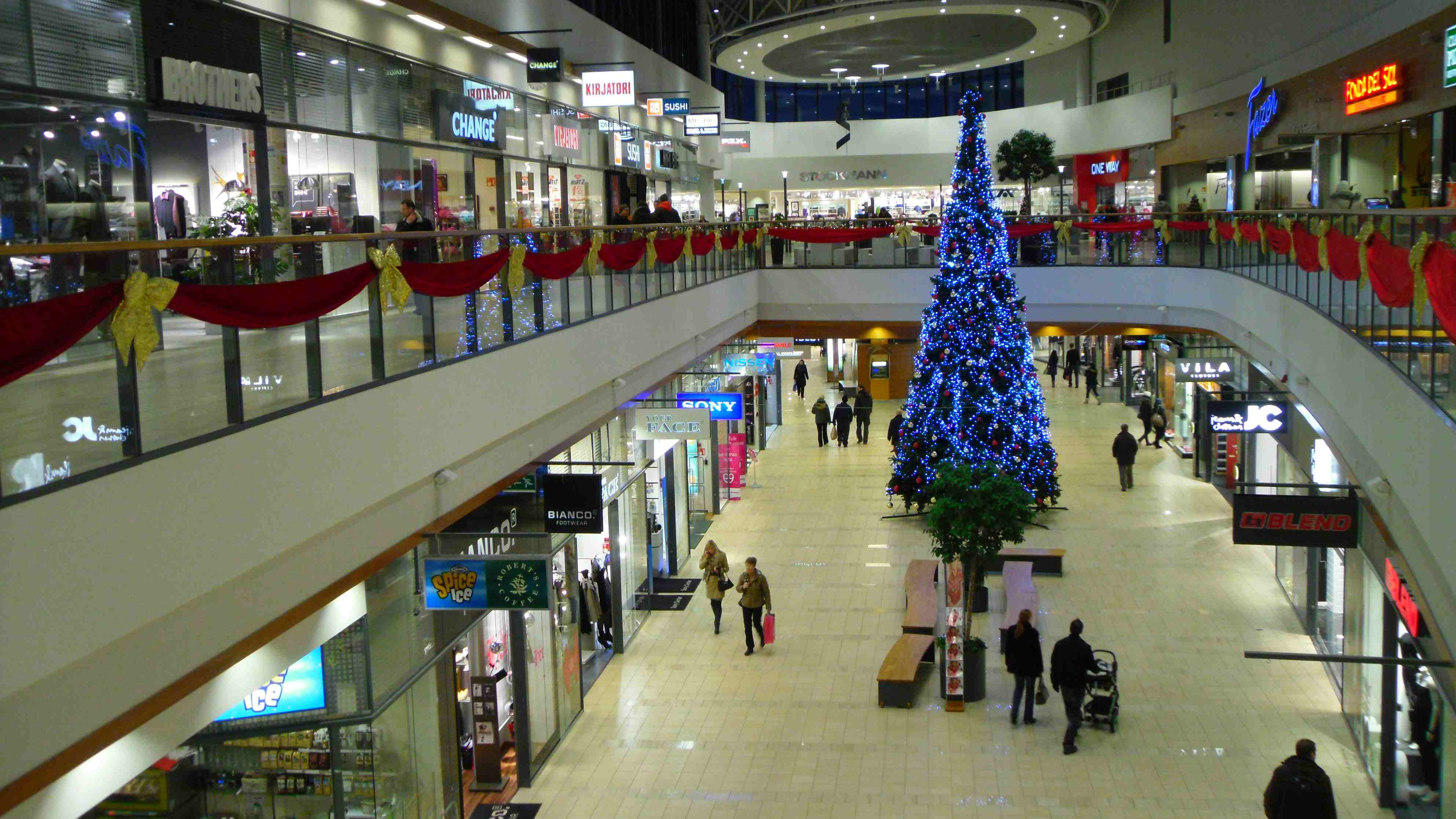
The Jumbo shopping centre in the Pakkala district of Vantaa is the third largest shopping centre in Finland.

In the latest years, Vantaa has stabilised its economy via an economy and debt program accepted in 2012. The growth of the loan stock was stopped by the end of the council term from 2013 to 2017. In 2016 the city managed to decrease its loan stock a little, which had grown to over one billion euro.

Vantaa has been in increasing debt since the early 2000s, due to a decrease in state funding and an increase in investments. A contributing factor to its situation is the high concentration of families with children, leading to comparatively larger social expenditure. According to the former mayor Juhani Paajanen, the worst expenditures have ended, and the city's gains are increasing.

On a nation-wide perspective, Vantaa has a high level of tax income, but in perspective of the capital region, the tax income of Vantaa is lower than those of Espoo and Helsinki. The state subsidy system and its stabilisation of tax income based on a nation-wide comparison have been seen as problematic because of special challenges of the cities in the capital region and because of constant rapid growth.

The municipal tax in Vantaa is 19.00%, which is clearly below the average in Finland and one of the lowest in the large cities. The last time Vantaa raised its municipal tax was in 2010. The state of Finland has raised the lower limit of the property tax because of new legislation.

In a comparison of characteristic figures of large cities Vantaa has developed positively in the latest years. In regard to municipal concerns and financing various investments, the differences in loan amounts in the cities have balanced out. In the early 2000s over half of the city's debt consisted of rental apartments owned by the city (managed by the company VAV Asunnot Oy). On the other hand, the city ended up in a crisis mainly because it had made large investments in its own balance with borrowed money. The city has hardly sold any of its property in the early 2000s.

=== Jobs and industry ===
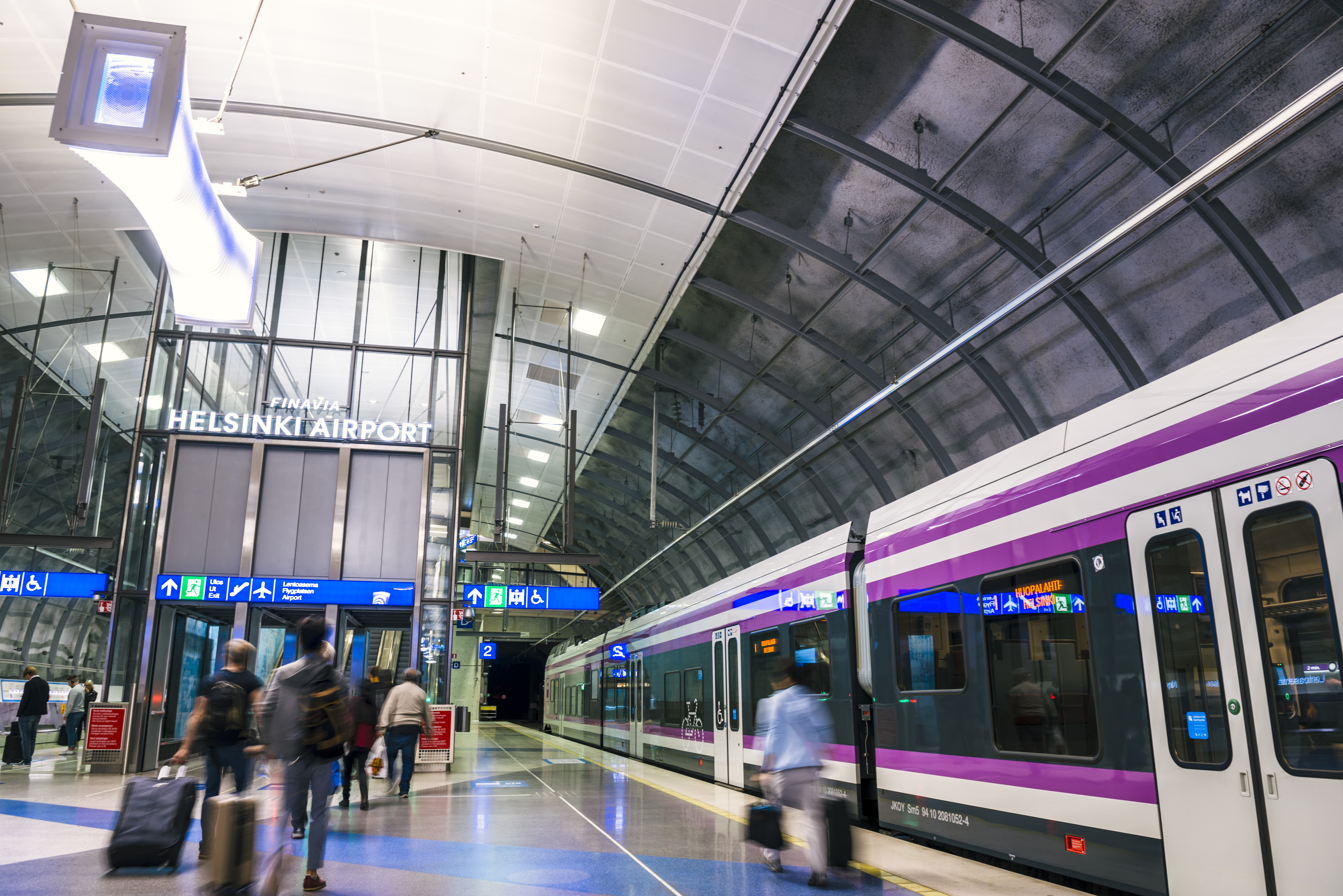
The Ring Rail Line provides a railway connection to the airport.

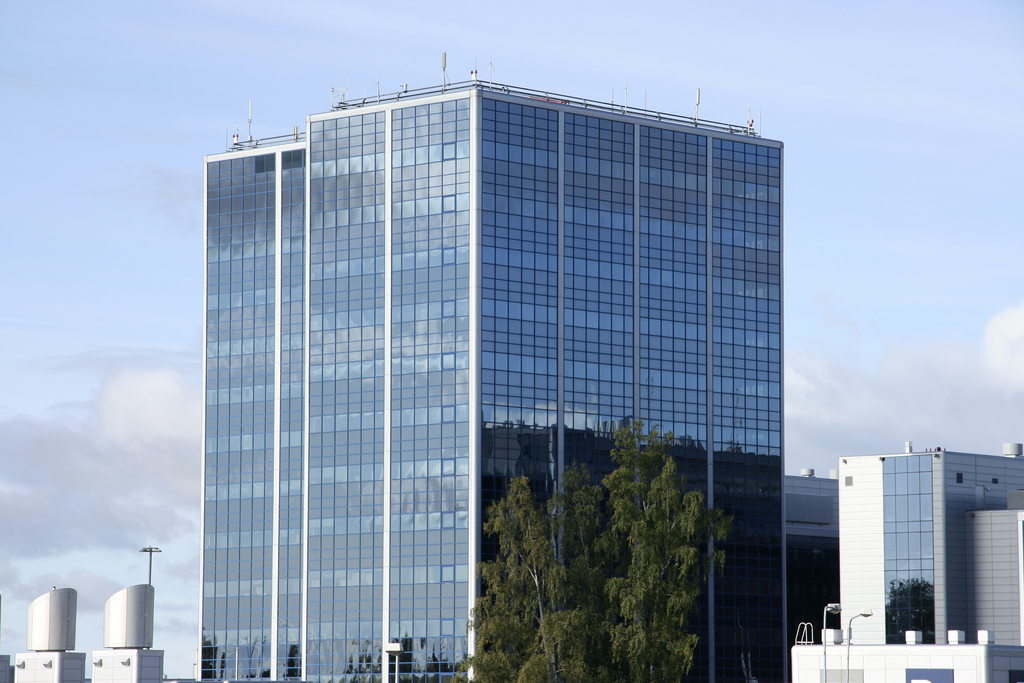
The head office of Finavia at the Helsinki Airport.

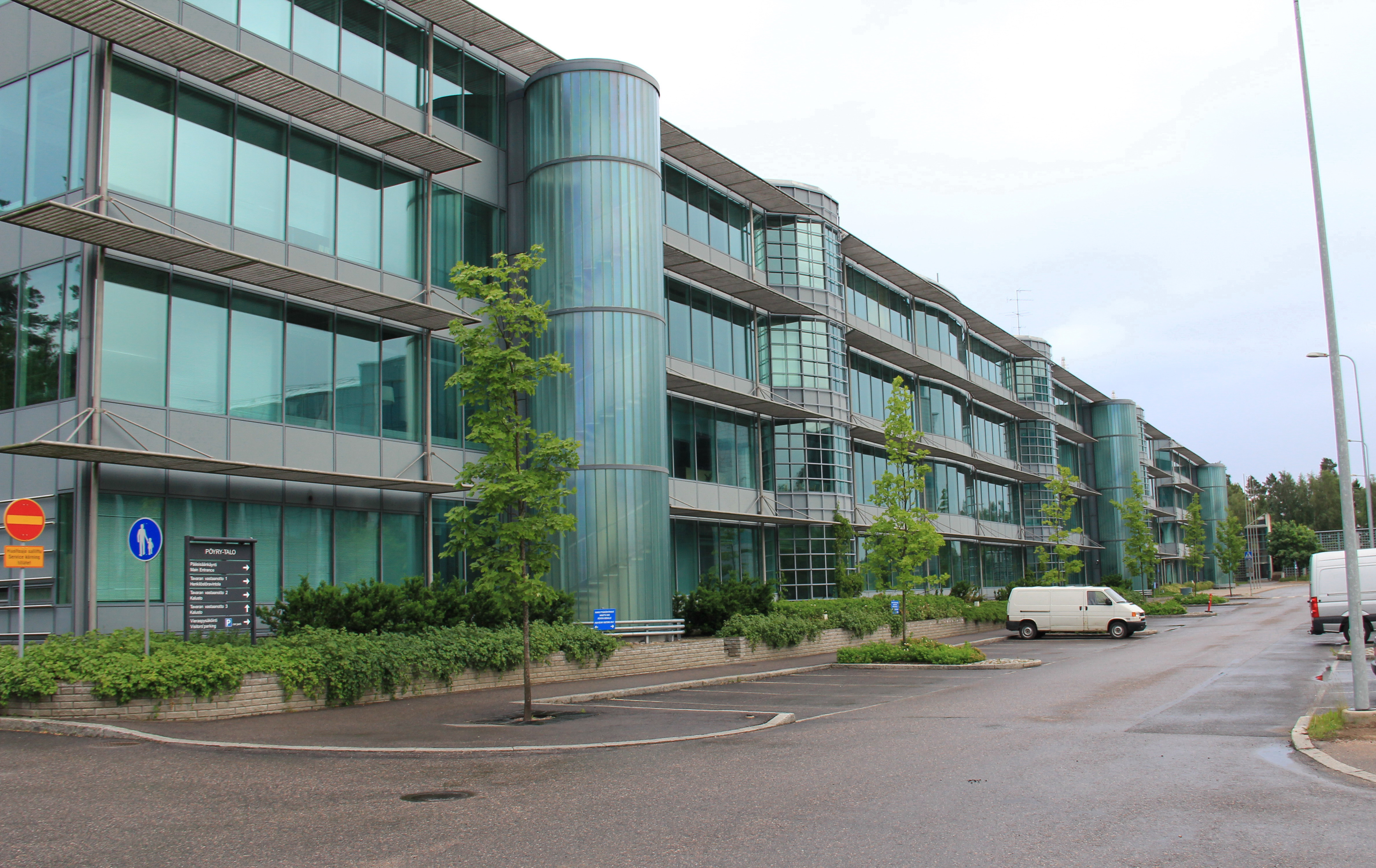
The head office of Pöyry in Martinlaakso.

Because of good traffic connections, Vantaa has a large amount of food, HVAC and machinery industry as well as businesses. There are industrial areas along the Ring III beltway, particularly near the airport and in the neighbouring districts of Viinikkala, Veromies, Pakkala and Koivuhaka as well as in Hakkila, connected to the main railway line by a branch terminal line. The Aviapolis area has developed around the airport, containing many businesses in logistics and high technology. In 2000 74.6% of the jobs in the city were in services, 23.8% in refinery and only 0.5% in agriculture. In 2001 the rate of self-sufficiency in jobs in Vantaa had risen to 97.1%. In the 2000s the number of jobs in Vantaa had grown by about 15%.

Of those employed, two thirds are in the private sector. The most common industries in Vantaa include the food, architectural engineering, and machine industries. In 2007, the unemployment rate was 6.3%.

Companies that have their headquarters in Vantaa (at the Helsinki Airport, in Aviapolis) include Finnair, Finavia and Nordic Regional Airlines. Companies with headquarters in Vantaa outside of Aviapolis include R-kioski, Tikkurila Oyj, Veikkaus Oy, and Metsähallitus. Fujifilm Finland has its headquarters in Vantaa.

An interesting future possibility for Vantaa and for the entire capital region comes from the Ring Rail Line, which allows for significant increase in the number of apartments and jobs and provides a direct rail connection from the main railway line to the Helsinki Airport. The Ring Rail Line required an investment of over one hundred million euro from Vantaa. The city of Helsinki had been proposing the idea of joining the municipalities in the capital region, in order to better develop the area, for decades. The cities of Vantaa, Espoo and Kauniainen have rejected this idea each time, although Vantaa has done so a bit more slowly than the others. The municipal and city managers of Vantaa have repeatedly rejected Helsinki's proposal fearing Vantaa would become a "backyard" of Helsinki. Helsinki has been expanding towards Vantaa throughout the 20th century, including the great annexation in 1946 and the annexation of Vuosaari in 1966. Through the annexation of Östersundom in Sipoo and the Västerkulla wedge to Helsinki in 2009, Vantaa lost its only connection to the sea, becoming the second-largest inland city in the Nordic countries, after Tampere.

== Arts and culture ==
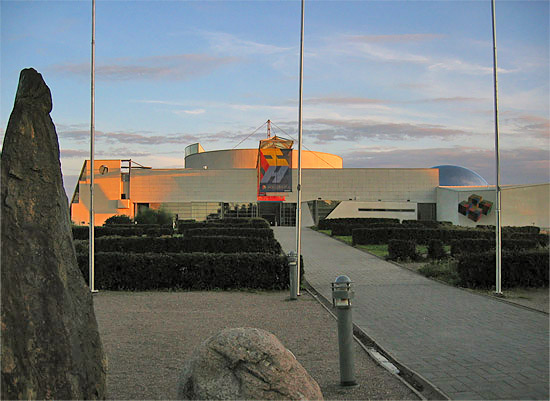
Science centre Heureka

=== Vantaa culture award ===
The Vantaa culture award is awarded each year as a recognition of significant contributions to the arts and the artistic life in the city, to a person living in Vantaa or to a community active in the city. The award was first awarded in 1976.

The decision to award the Vantaa culture award is made by the city council. In 2015, the award was worth 10 thousand euro. Award winners include jazz musician Juhani Aaltonen, musicians Maarit and Sami Hurmerinta, sculptor Heikki Häiväoja, director Matti Kassila, architect Alpo Halme, writer Virpi Hämeen-Anttila together with here husband professor Jaakko Hämeen-Anttila, actor Lasse Pöysti, the Raatikko dance theatre, entertainer Virve Rosti, writer Alpo Ruuth, opera singer Esa Runttunen and the Vantaa children's ballet.

=== Symbols ===
The signature animal of Vantaa is the salmon, also featured in the coat of arms of the city, the traditional dish is salmon soup and the signature plant is the common dog-violet.

=== Music ===
There are about 20 choirs in Vantaa, like Vantaan Laulu and Vantaa Chamber Choir. Three actively performing concert bands Tikkurilan Soittokunta, Lumon Puhaltajat and Puhallinorkesteri Louhi exist at the east, north and west corners of the city respectively. Vantaa Pops (Vantaan Viihdeorkesteri in Finnish), conducted by a Welshman Nick Davies, is the only professional full symphonic pops orchestra in Finland.

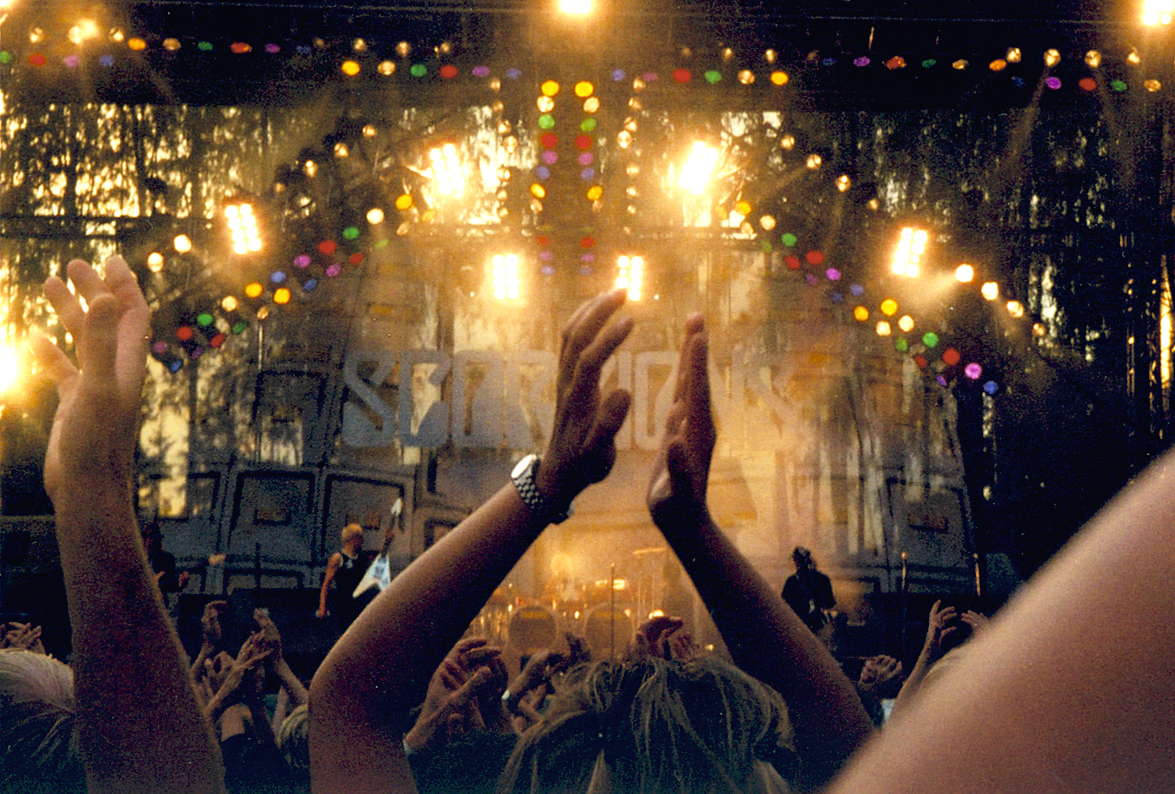
Scorpions performing at Ankkarock in 2003.

Ankkarock was a rock music festival held every summer in Korso between 1989 and 2010.

Louhela Jam is the oldest continuously organised rock music festival in Vantaa. The festival lasts one day and is free of charge. It is held in the Jokiuomanpuisto park between Louhela and Martinlaakso on the first Sunday in June after the end of the spring semester in school.

The Tikkurila Festival, held on a weekend in late July at the Hiekkaharju sports field represents newer summer festival tradition in Vantaa.

The Vantaan barokki festival was held in summertime for sixteen years until its discontinuation in 2008. The Vantaan musiikkijuhlat festival was founded in 2010, continuing the previous festival's tradition in concentrating on older music. The newer festival covers a longer time period, and according to the artistic director Markku Luolajan-Mikkola the festival concentrates more on periodical instruments than any specific time period.

The Herättäjäjuhlat festival of the Awakening movement was held in Vantaa in 2016.

=== Museums ===
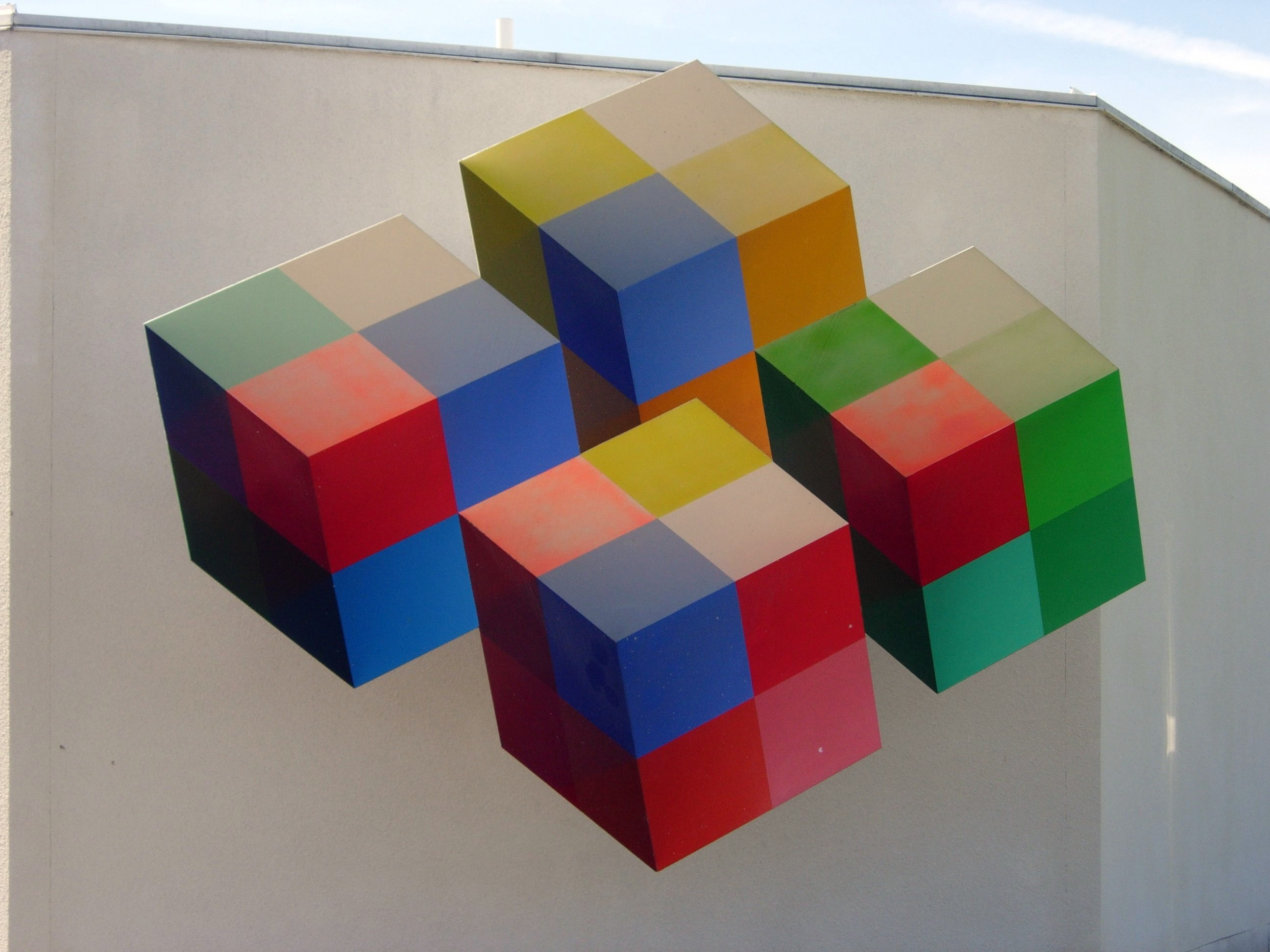
The symbol of Heureka, Neljä kuutiota ("Four cubes") by Anssi Asunta, is an optical illusion looking like cubes.

Tikkurila is home of the major science centre in Finland, Heureka, opened in April 1989. The purpose of the science centre is to develop the understanding of scientific information and to develop methods of scientific education. The name Heureka refers to the famous statement "I have found it!" by Archimedes.

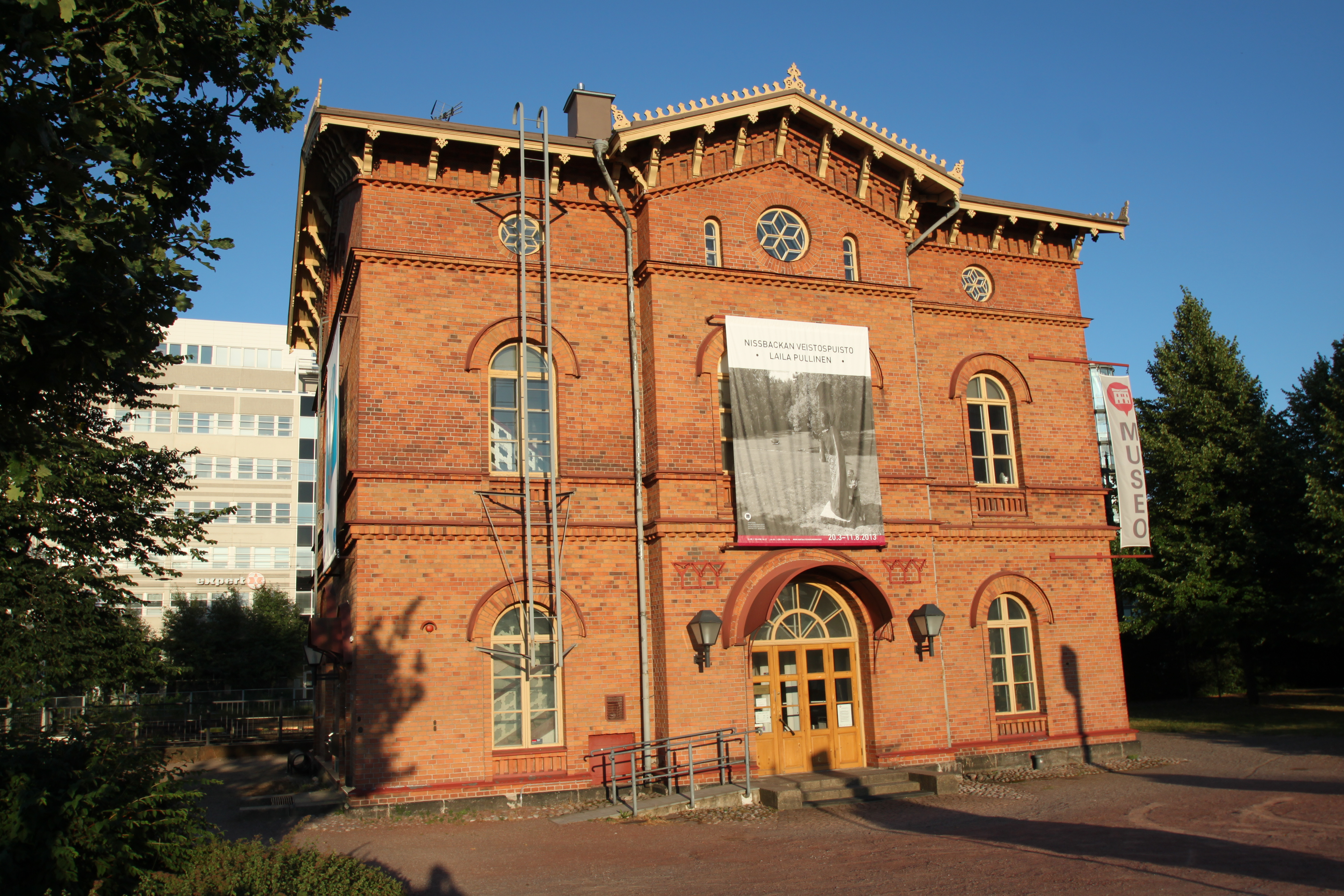
The city museum of Vantaa in Tikkurila.

The city museum of Vantaa is located in the old station building of the railway station in Tikkurila which has exhibitions with various themes on local history. The museum is housed in the oldest station building in Finland, designed by Carl Albert Edelfelt and completed in 1861. The museum moved to the building after it was renovated in autumn 1990. The first two floors of the red brick museum building host exhibits and the third floor hosts the offices of the museum staff.

The Finnish Aviation Museum is located in Vantaa, near Helsinki Airport.

=== Concert house Martinus ===
The concert house Martinus in Martinlaakso, built in 1987, offers premises for various events ranging from meetings and seminars to cultural events.

Because of its good acoustics, the concert hall has been used for many musical recordings. The hall has also been used for many television recordings. There are 444 guest seats in the hall, of which six are seats for disabled people. The foyer of the concert hall can host small-scale concerts and other events. Martinus is the home hall of the Vantaa entertainment orchestra run by Nick Davies.

=== Myyrmäkitalo ===
The Myyrmäkitalo all-activity house in western Vantaa hosts the Myyrmäki library offering services at a main library scale (another such library in Vantaa is the Tikkurila library), the Vantaa art museum Artsi and a rising auditorium with 188 seats. The auditorium hosts the film theatre Kino Myyri. Main users of the educational facilities of the house include the Vantaa school of arts, the Vantaa adult education institute and many hobby clubs. The house, built in autumn 1993, is located near the Myyrmäki railway station and the Myyrmanni shopping centre.

=== Food culture ===
In the 1980s, salmon casserole, salmon soup and vol-au-vent filled with salmon were chosen as the traditional dishes in Vantaa.

== Politics ==
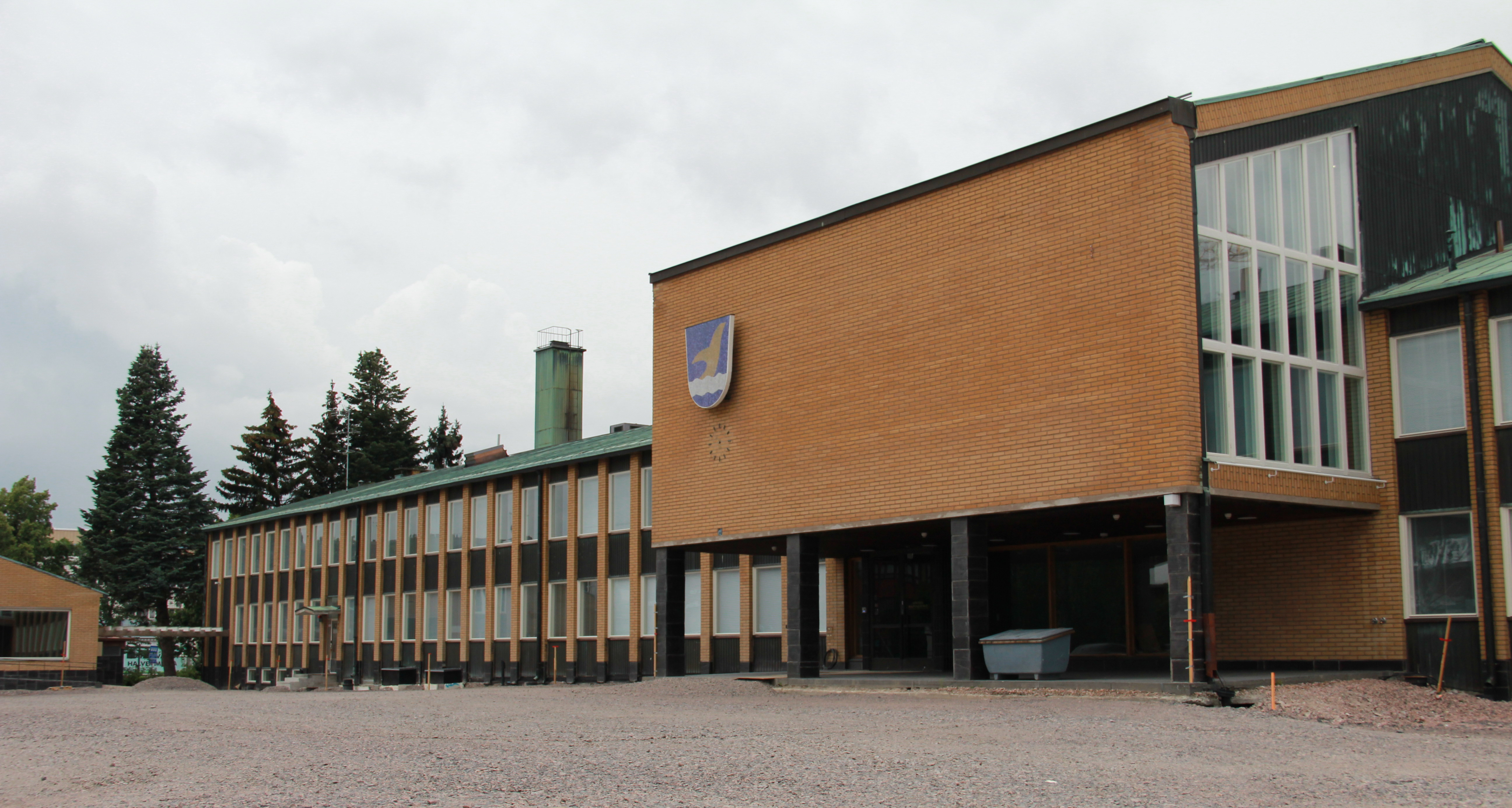
The city hall of Vantaa, located in Tikkurila

Vantaa’s city council has 67 seats. Following the 2025 Finnish municipal elections the council seats are allocated in the following way: Social Democratic Party 21 seats (+5), National Coalition Party 18 seats (-), Green League 9 seats (-), Finns Party 7 seats (-5), Left Alliance 6 seats (+2), Centre Party (Finland) 3 seats (+1), Christian Democrats 2 seats (-), Swedish People's Party of Finland 1 seat (-1).

=== Mayors ===
| Mayor | Birth – death | In office |
|---|---|---|
| Lauri Korpinen | 1896–1975 | 1957–1961 |
| Lauri Lairala | 1926–2012 | 1961–1989 |
| Pirjo Ala-Kapee | 1944– | 1989–1997 |
| Erkki Rantala | 1946–2014 | 1997–2003 |
| Juhani Paajanen | 1947– | 2003–2011 |
| Jukka Peltomäki | 1949– | 2011 |
| Kari Nenonen | 1953– | 2012–2018 |
| Ritva Viljanen | 1958– | 2018–2023 |
| Pekka Timonen | 1966– | 2023– |

== Infrastructure ==
=== Services ===
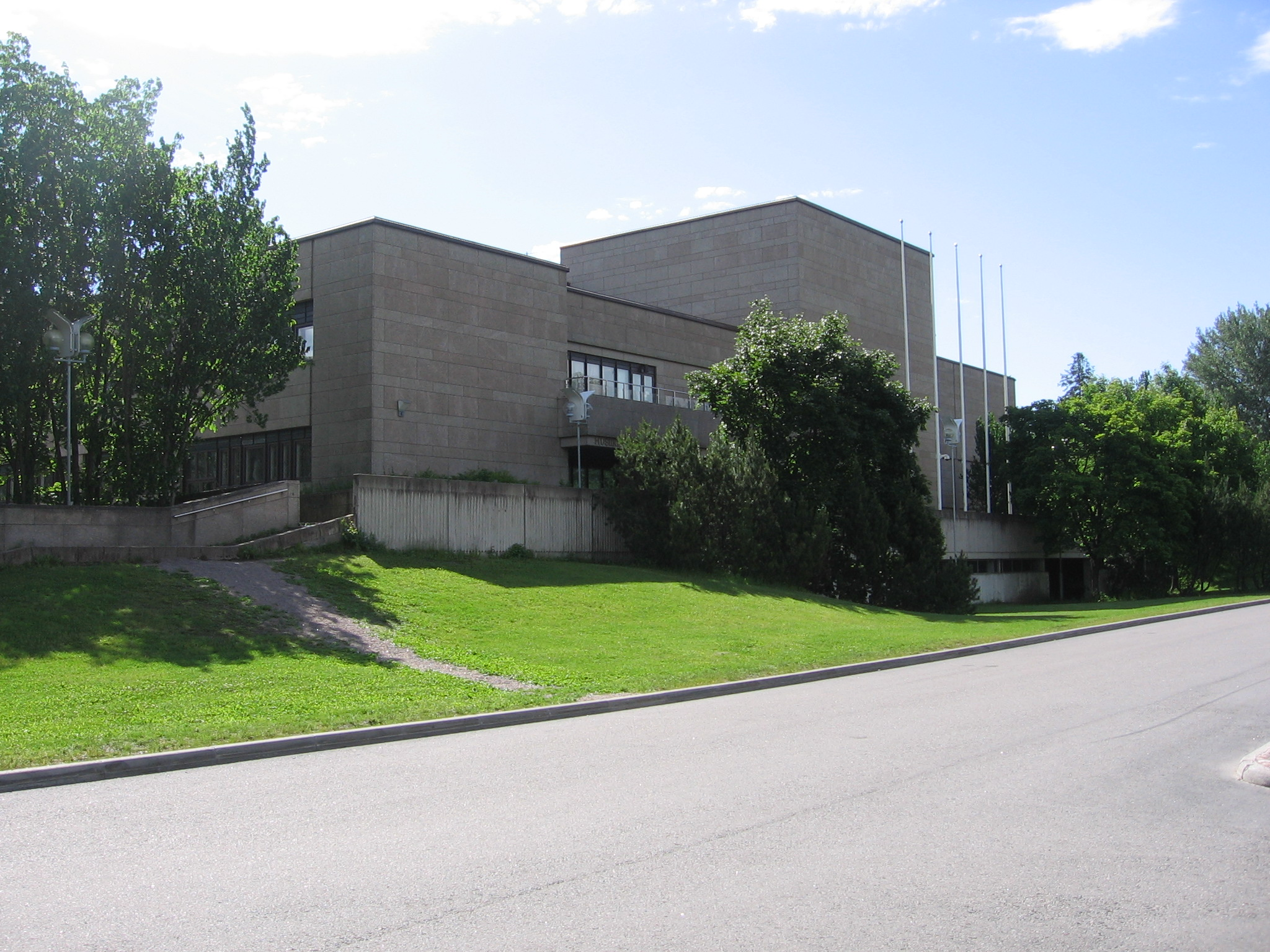
The main library of Vantaa, in Tikkurila

There are eight healthcare stations in Vantaa. Most of the major districts have their own healthcare stations, although the Aviapolis major districts are served by healthcare stations from neighbouring major districts. Vantaa has two hospitals, Peijas Hospital in Asola and Katriina Hospital in Seutula. Peijas is responsible for emergency and short-term health services, while Katriina specializes in long-term care and elderly care.

Vantaa is a constituent of the Wellbeing services county of Vantaa and Kerava.

The Vantaa branch of the HelMet library network has 12 libraries in Vantaa, with a total of 441,736 books in 2011. The main library is in Tikkurila.

=== Sports ===
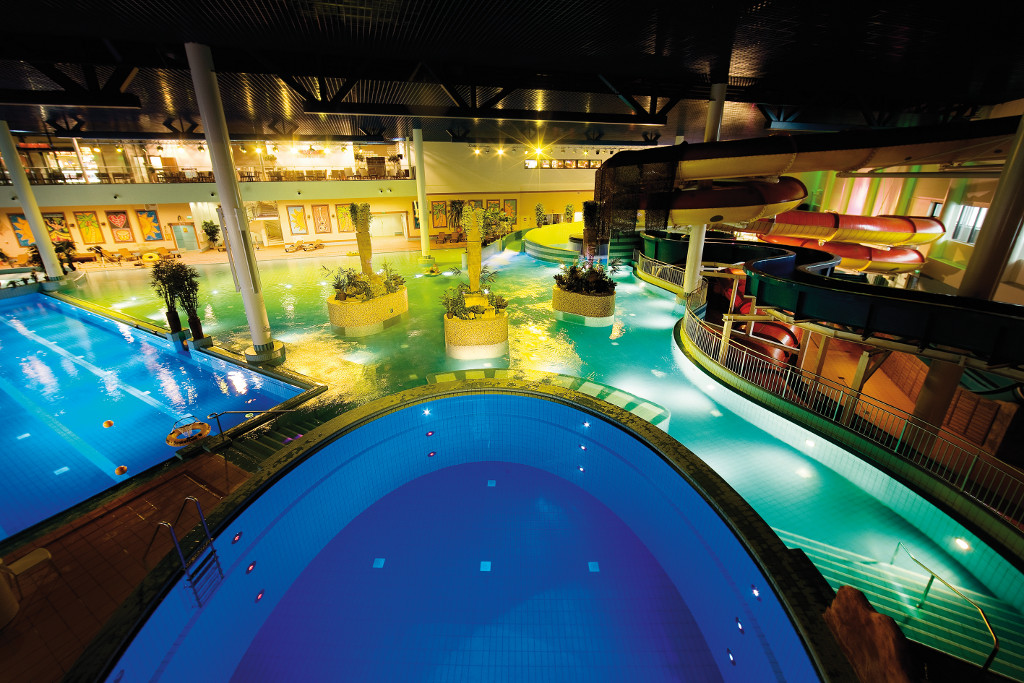
Flamingo Spa at the Flamingo Entertainment Center in the Aviapolis district

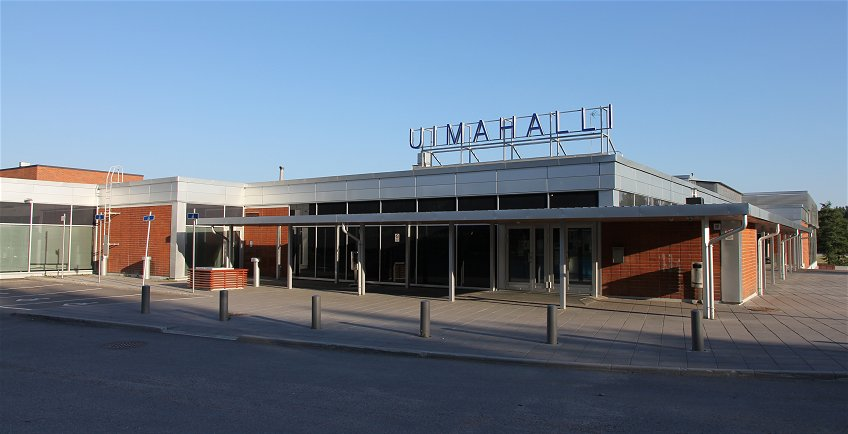
The Hakunila swimming pool.

For sports, Vantaa has five swimming halls, four sports halls, several gyms, 25 tennis courts, indoor ice rinks in Tikkurila and Myyrmäki, 69 hockey and skating rinks, 16 lit-up running tracks, and 14 skateparks.

Additionally, Vantaa has three golf courses. There are two 18-hole golf courses in Keimola, a 9-hole golf course in the Hiekkaharju sports park (in the districts of Jokiniemi and Havukoski), and a golf course in Petikko which was expanded from 9 to 18 holes in 2018.

Vantaa is the center of Finnish rugby activities; the home of the Finnish national rugby team is located at the Ruutisavu Arena in the Hakunila district.

=== Transportation ===
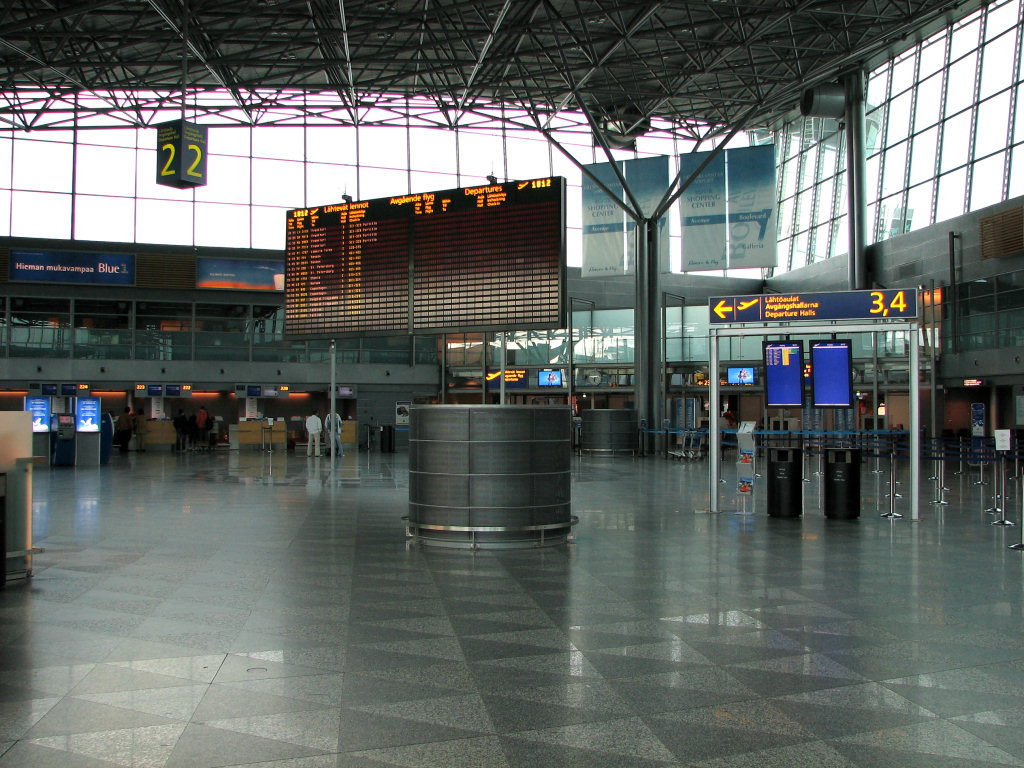
The Helsinki Airport (HEL), although associated with Helsinki, is located in Aviapolis, Vantaa.

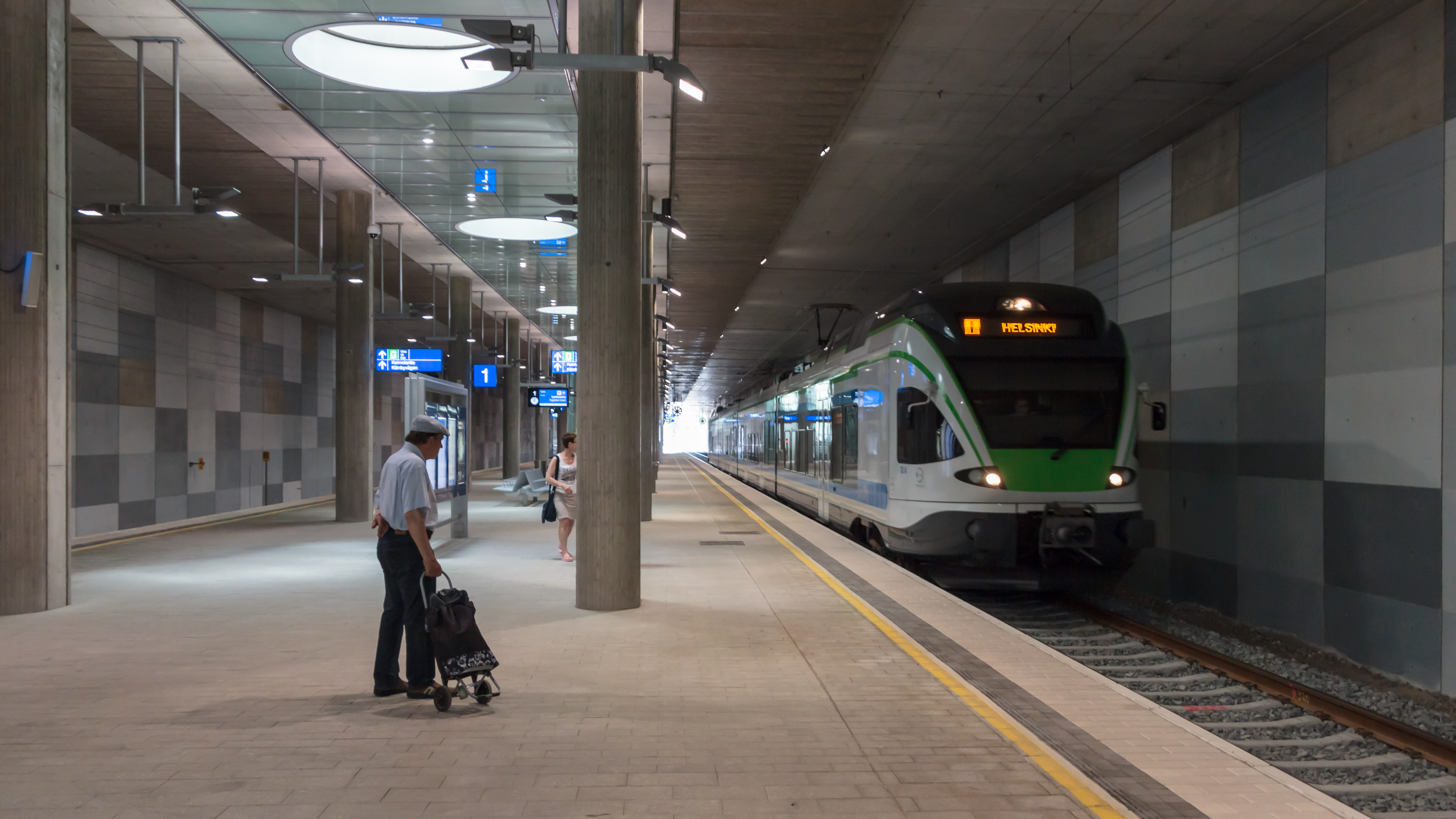
Kivistö railway station along the Ring Rail Line in the Kivistö district.

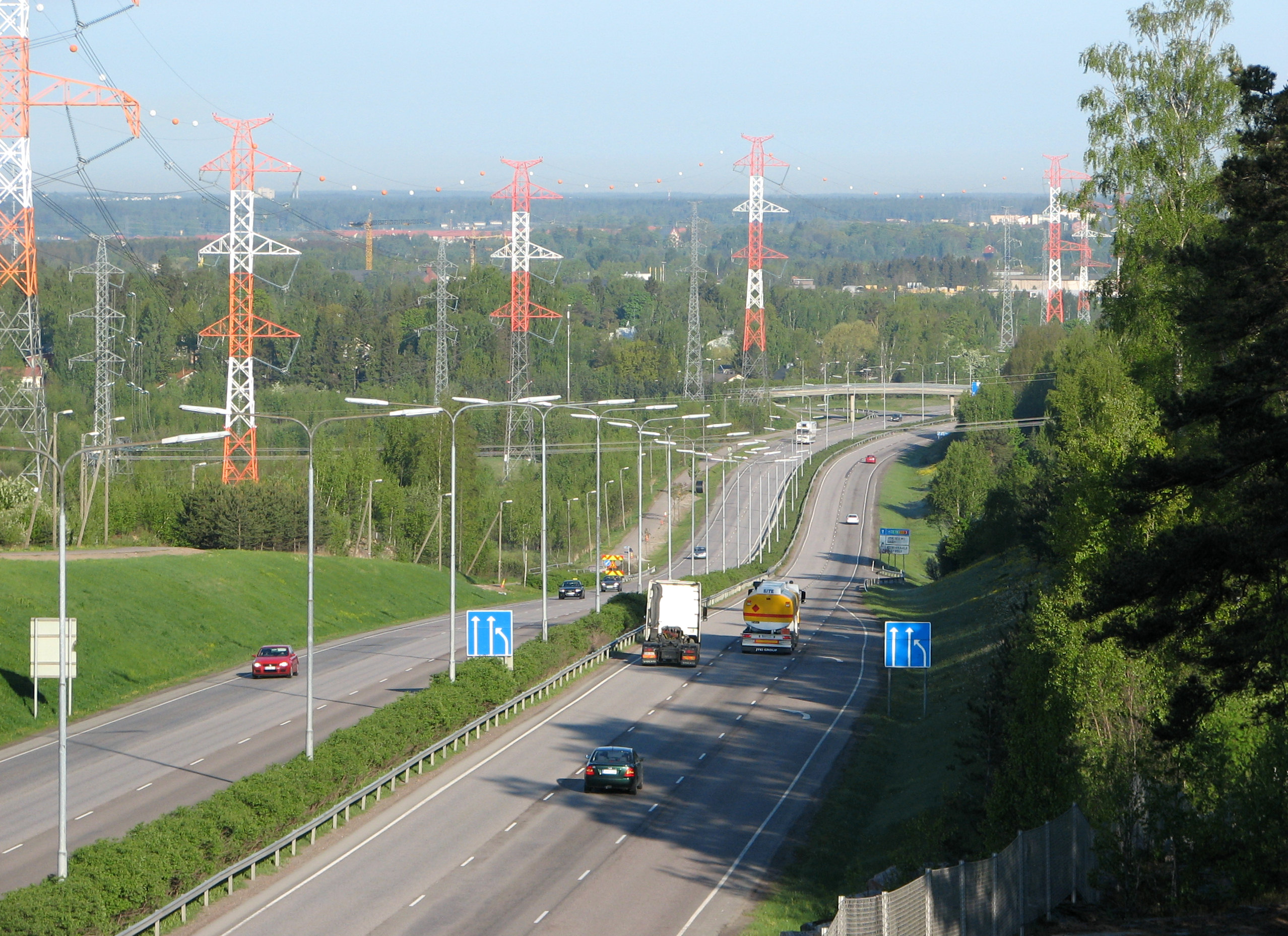
Ring III at Kalkkikallio in Kuninkaala.

Vantaa infrastructurally serves as the transportational hub of the Helsinki metropolitan area. Several key freeways and highways, such as Ring III, Tuusulanväylä and Porvoonväylä, originate in or pass through the municipality. Other widely used connections in the direction of Helsinki include Hämeenlinnanväylä, Lahdenväylä and Vihdintie.

Public transport in Vantaa consists of a bus network and commuter rail, provided by HSL/HRT and VR. Since the introduction of the Ring Rail Line in 2015, Vantaa has had a total of 14 stations. Key railway stations also act as central bus stations.

Bus transport in Vantaa is extensive: there are over one hundred bus lines in Vantaa, of which the majority are internal lines in Vantaa and the rest are regional lines travelling to Helsinki, Espoo and Kerava.

Of the express bus stops in Vantaa, the stops at Kaivoksela, Martinlaakso and Keimolanportti are located along Hämeenlinnanväylä, while the stop at Tammisto is located along Tuusulanväylä and the stops at Vantaanportti and Ilmakehä are located between Tuusulanväylä and the Helsinki Airport. The stop at Tuupakka serves the express buses between the Helsinki Airport and Tampere. There are no express bus stops along Lahdenväylä in Vantaa. However, the express buses between Lahti and the Helsinki Airport stop at Korso. The express buses from the Helsinki Airport to Porvoo and Kotka stop at the Tikkurila intersection on the Ring III beltway.

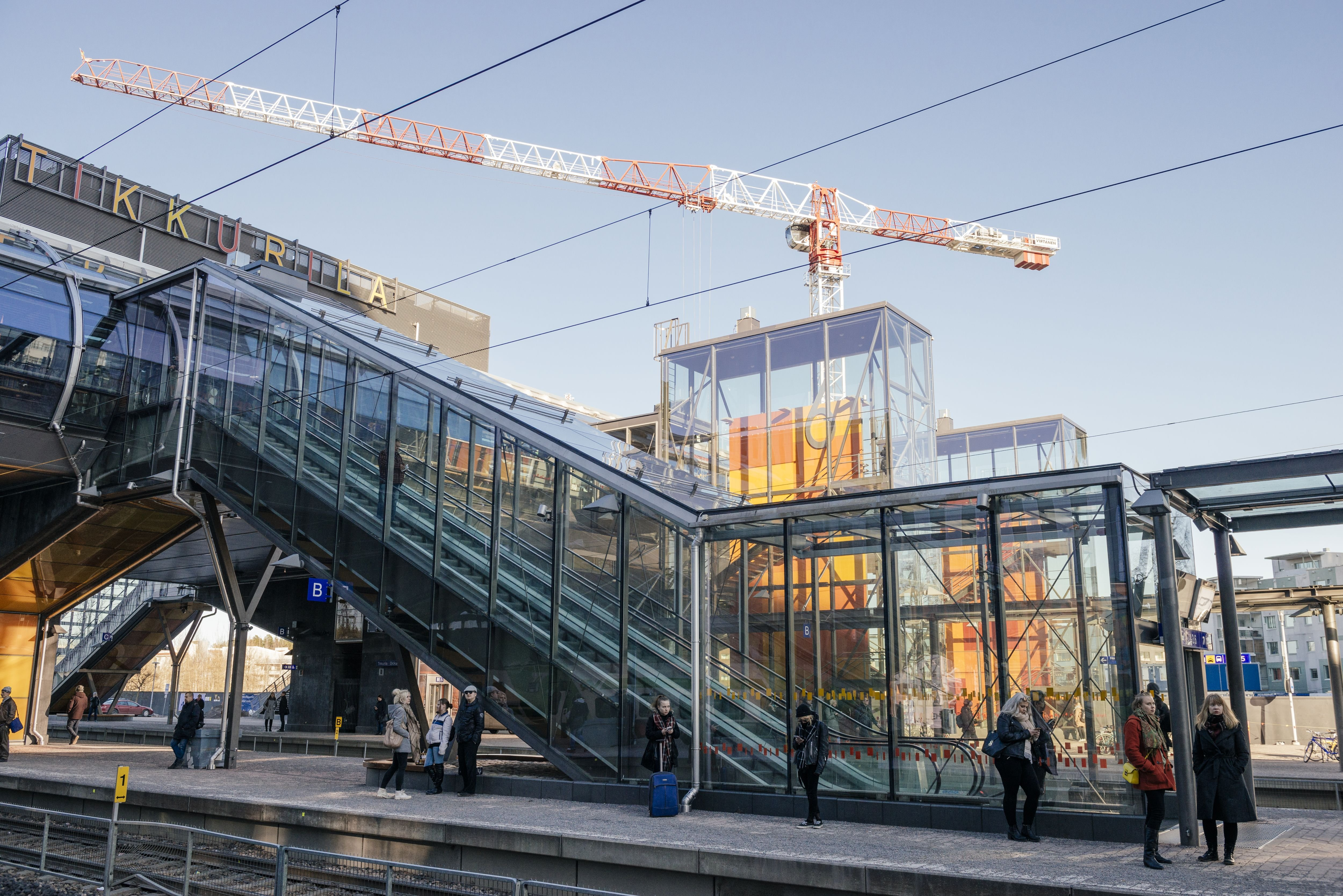
The Tikkurila railway station is the busiest railway station in Vantaa.

Two of the three railway lines exiting Helsinki pass through Vantaa, connecting the city's 14 stations. The Helsinki–Riihimäki railway passes through eastern Vantaa while the Ring Rail Line forms a loop throughout Vantaa, going from Helsinki via Myyrmäki railway station in western Vantaa to the Helsinki Airport station and then continuing via Tikkurila railway station in eastern Vantaa back to Helsinki. All long-distance trains exiting Helsinki via the Helsinki–Riihimäki railway stop at Tikkurila railway station in Vantaa, including trains going to Russia.

The stations on the Vantaankoski railway are Myyrmäki, Louhela, Martinlaakso and Vantaankoski. The stations on the Ring Rail Line are Vehkala, Kivistö, Aviapolis, Helsinki Airport and Leinelä. The stations on the main railway are Tikkurila railway station, Hiekkaharju, Koivukylä, Rekola and Korso. There are also direct local bus connections to the Helsinki Airport from the Martinlaakso and Vantaankoski stations as well as the Korso and Koivukylä stops. There are preliminary plans for a new station at Vallinoja between Korso and Savio with the working name Urpia. In 2004 a fourth track to Kerava was added to the main railway, so local trains and long-distance trains now run on separate tracks. The Ring Rail Line was completed in 2015, connecting the main railway with the Vantaankoski railway, also travelling via the Helsinki Airport. The completion of the Ring Rail Line has sped up development of new residential and office areas. For example, the number of jobs in the Vantaankoski area has doubled. An idea contest was held for new design ideas in the area.

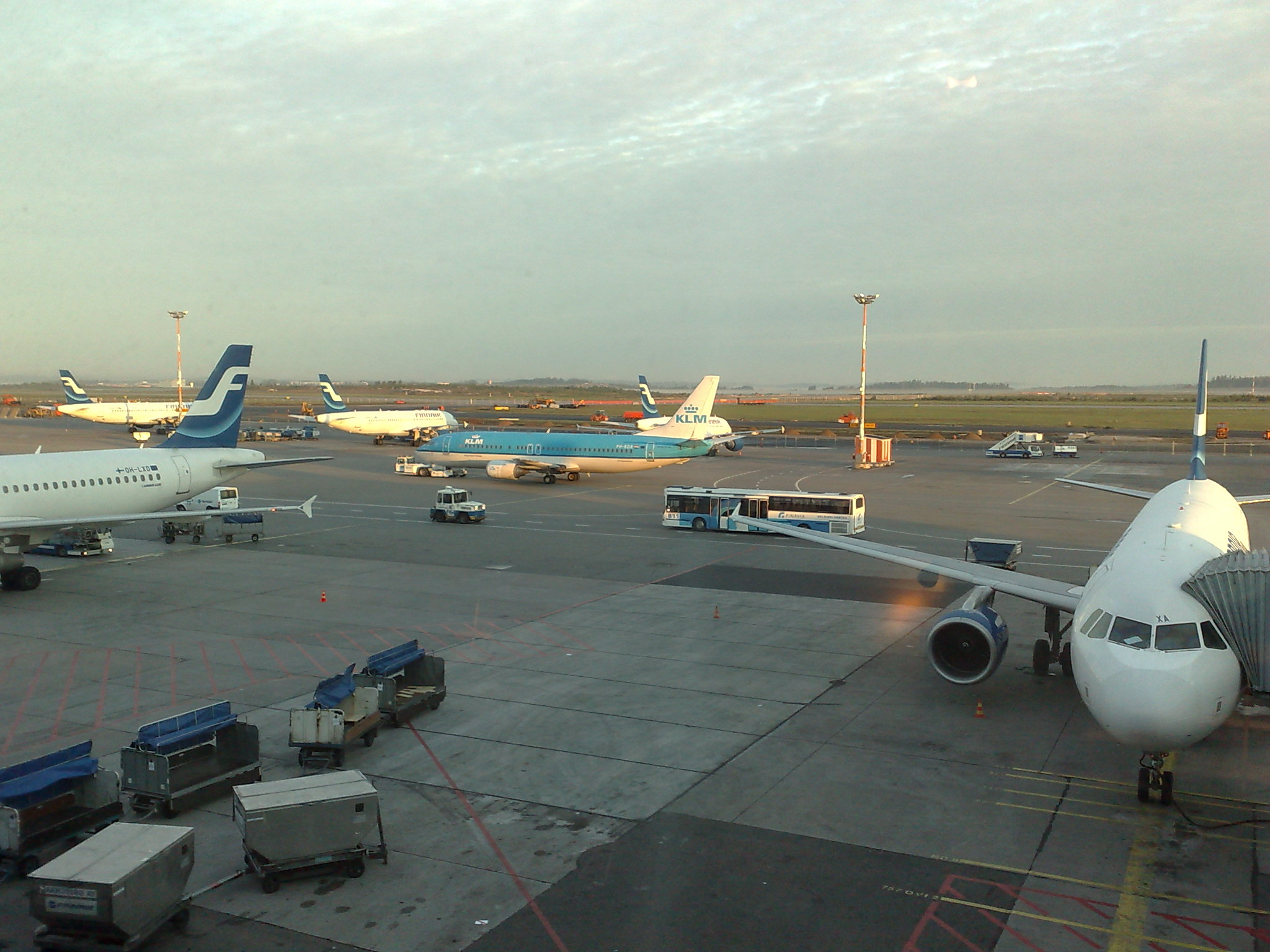
Airplanes at the Helsinki Airport on an August morning.

The largest airport in Finland, and the primary airport of metropolitan area, Helsinki Airport, is located in Vantaa. It attracted a total of 17.1 million passengers in 2016 and a total of 18.9 million passengers in 2017. The airport has done well in international comparisons. The airport splits Vantaa roughly into an eastern and a western part: the administrative centre and the main concentration of population are mostly located in eastern Vantaa.

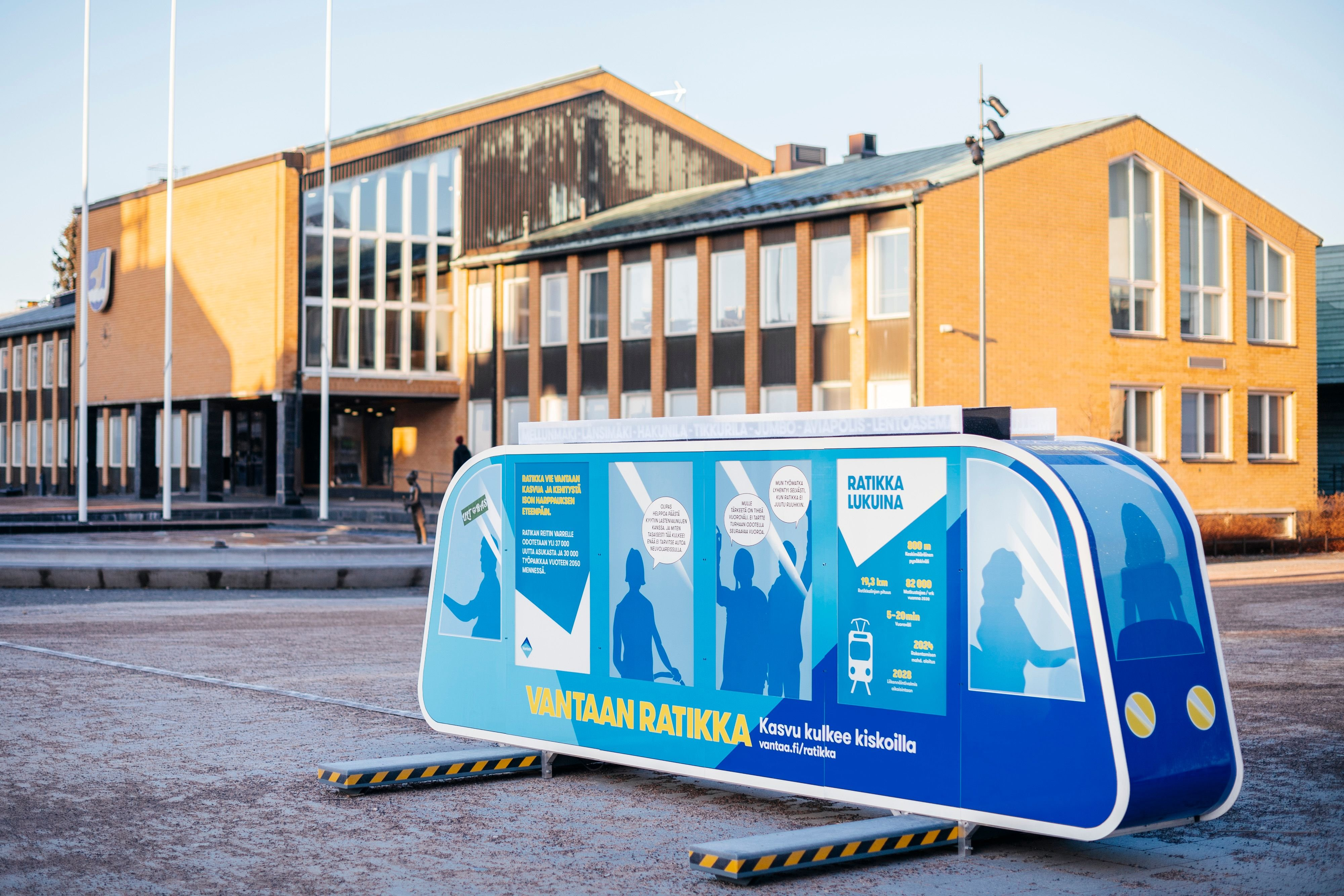
An information campaign for the planned Vantaa light rail.

On 16 December 2019 the city council of Vantaa approved the investment of 400 million euro to the planning of the Vantaa light rail with votes 45 to 22. The planned route leads from Mellunmäki via Hakunila, Tikkurila and Aviapolis to the Helsinki Airport.

As a major transport hub, Vantaa suffers from extensive noise and pollution caused by airplanes, railways and motorways. According to noise research, over 77,000 citizens of Vantaa live in an area experiencing over 55 dB of noise. Road noise in Vantaa is caused by the Ring III beltway, Hämeenlinnanväylä, Tuusulanväylä, Lahdenväylä and Porvoonväylä. About 7000 citizens of Vantaa live in an area experiencing noise from airplane traffic and about 9000 live in an area experiencing noise from railway traffic.

=== Waste ===
The largest waste incinerator in Finland, the Vantaa incinerator, is located at Vantaa.

== Education ==
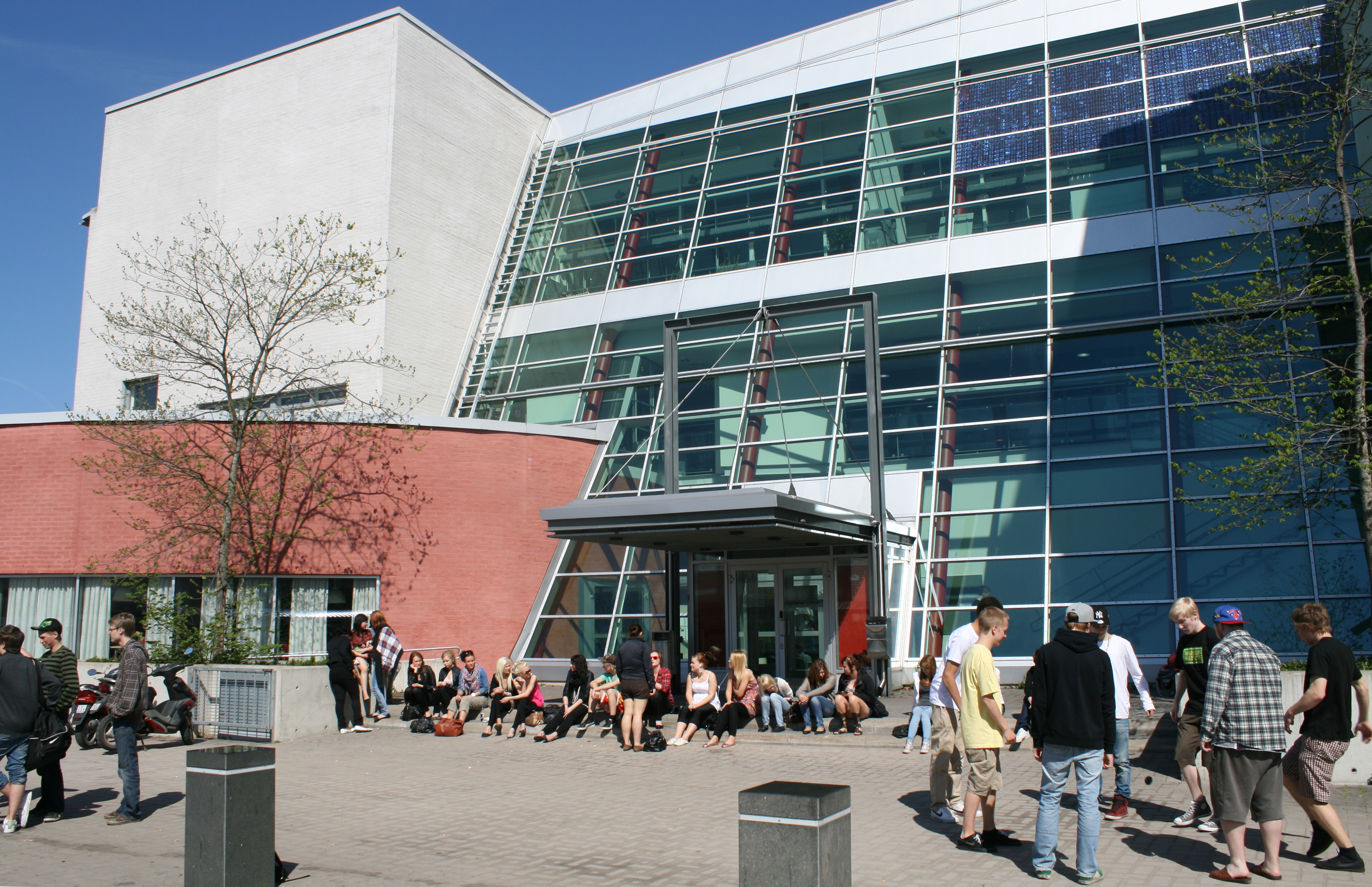
The Lumo upper secondary school in Korso.

=== Primary education ===
Vantaa offers diverse opportunities in primary education. The city has a total of 50 Finnish-speaking, five Swedish-speaking, and one English-speaking primary and junior high schools. The schools come in various sizes, of which the smallest is the Swedish-speaking Kyrkoby skola, which has been located in the same school building since 1837. In contrast, the largest primary schools in Vantaa are Finnish-speaking schools of over 800 students such as the Mikkola and Lehtikuusi schools.

=== Secondary and vocational education ===
Vantaa has five Finnish-speaking upper secondary schools, including Tikkurila Upper Secondary, the largest upper secondary school in the Nordic Countries, as well as one Swedish-speaking upper secondary school. In addition, Vantaa has a Steiner school including primary and secondary education, online education at the Sotunki Upper Secondary and adult education at the Tikkurila Upper Secondary.

For vocational education, Vantaa has several vocational schools, such as the Varia vocational school, the Mercuria school of business economics, the Vocational school for probation, Työtehoseura and Edupoli, of which the latter two offer vocational training for youths and adults and hold vocational screening. Vocational education for special groups is offered by the Vantaa offices of the Vocational school Live and the Kiipula vocational school. It is also possible to take the Finnish matriculation examination in connection with vocational education (a double examination for example in the Varia vocational school).

=== Tertiary education ===
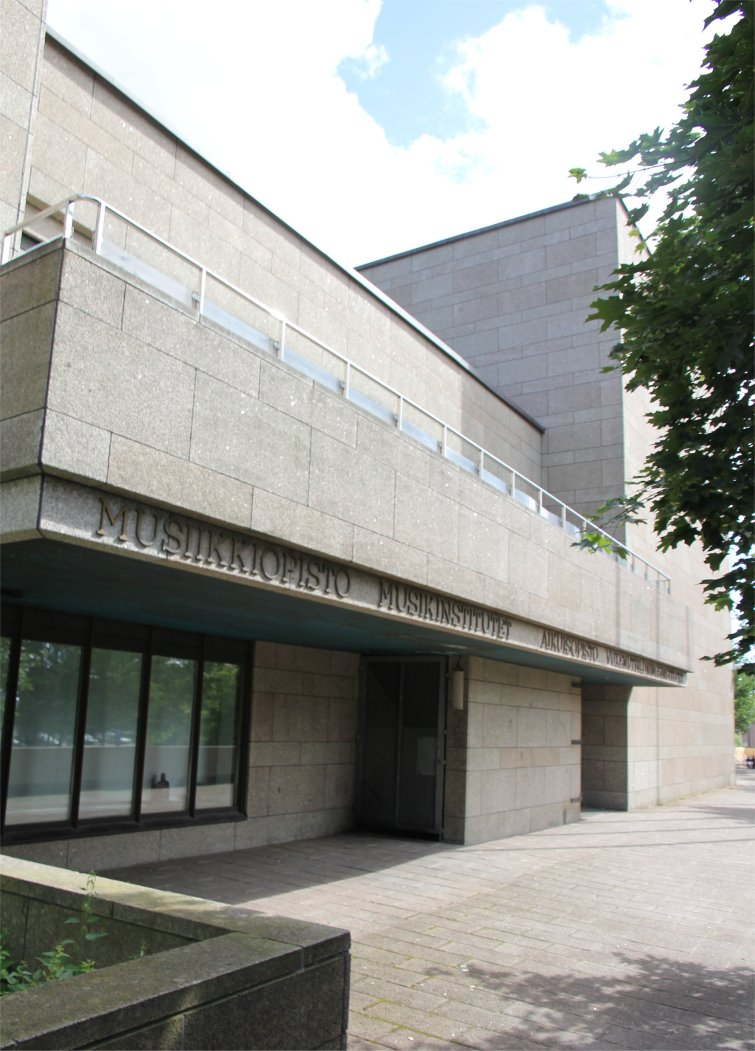
The Vantaa institution for music.

Vantaa has two universities of applied sciences: Metropolia and Laurea. Metropolia has offices in Myyrmäki (technical education and Metropolia Business School) and Tikkurila (institution for design). Laurea offers education in communications and social and healthcare in Tikkurila.

=== Educational institutions ===
The Vantaa institution for adult education is one of the largest educational institutions in Finland. Education is also provided by the Vantaa institution for arts, the Vantaa institution for music, the Vantaa institution for creative writing and a couple of private educational institutions.

=== Education for immigrants ===
It is possible to study the Finnish language at various places all over Vantaa. Some courses can be taken for free and some require payment.

== Notable people ==
- Anna Abreu (born 1990), pop singer
- Mika Häkkinen (born 1968), racing driver and 1998 and 1999 Formula One champion
- Jani Kautto (born 1989), ice hockey player
- Lauri Markkanen (born 1997), professional basketball player
- Jere Pöyhönen (born 1993), rapper and singer
- Jarkko Ruutu (born 1975), ice hockey player
- Tuomo Ruutu (born 1983), ice hockey player
- Constance Ullner (1856-1926), writer

== International relations ==
=== Twin towns and sister cities ===
Vantaa is twinned with:

| Askim, Norway (1951); Frankfurt an der Oder, Germany (1987); Huddinge, Sweden (1951); Jinan, Shandong, China (2001) | Kineshma, Russia (1969); Lyngby-Taarbæk, Denmark (1951); Matte Yehuda, Israel (1967); Mladá Boleslav, Czech Republic (1978) | District of Rastatt, Germany (1968); Salgótarján, Hungary (1976); Seyðisfjörður, Iceland (1980); Słupsk, Poland (1987) |

== Gallery ==
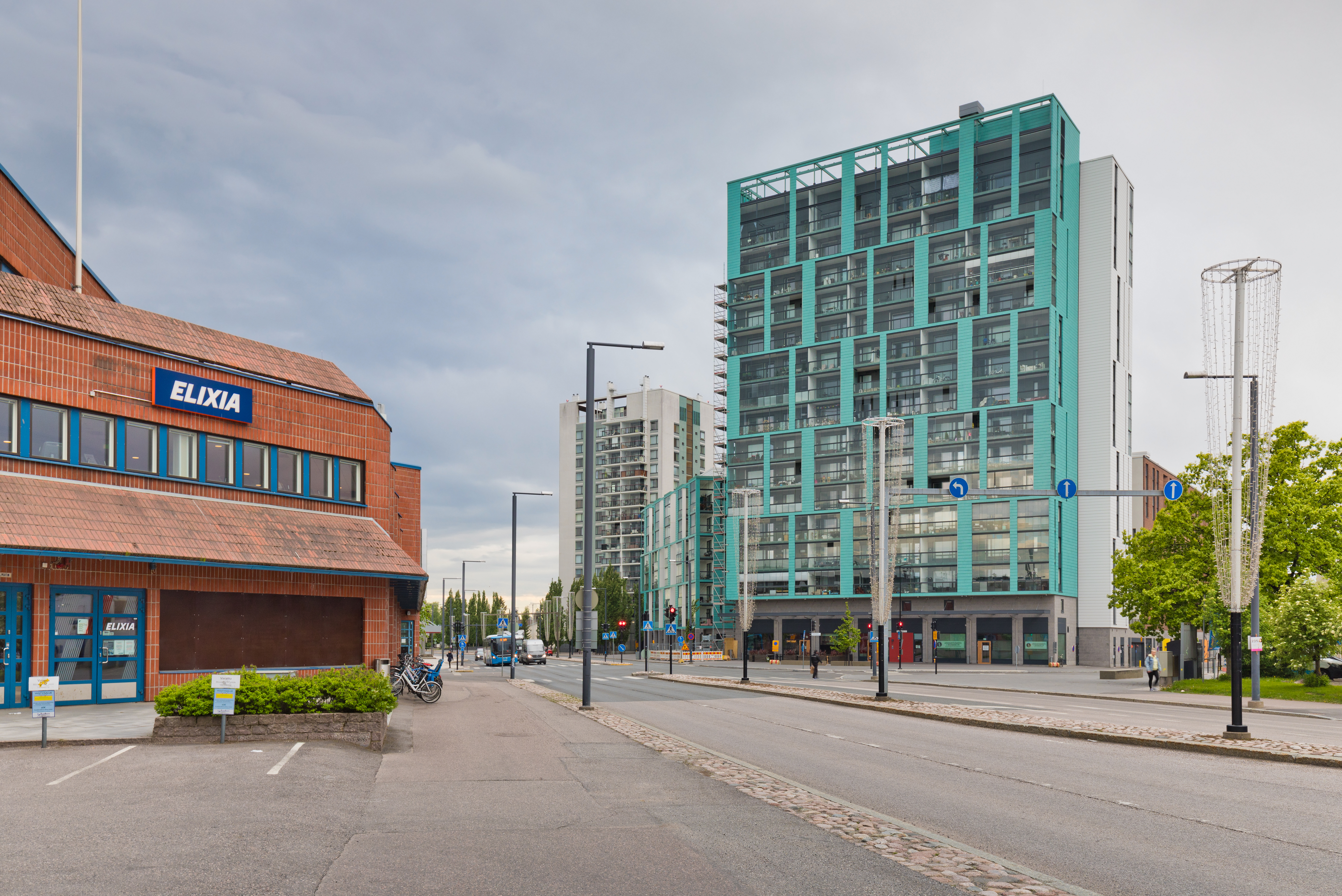
The part of the city centre in Tikkurila with Vantaan Sarastus and Kielotorni apartment buildings

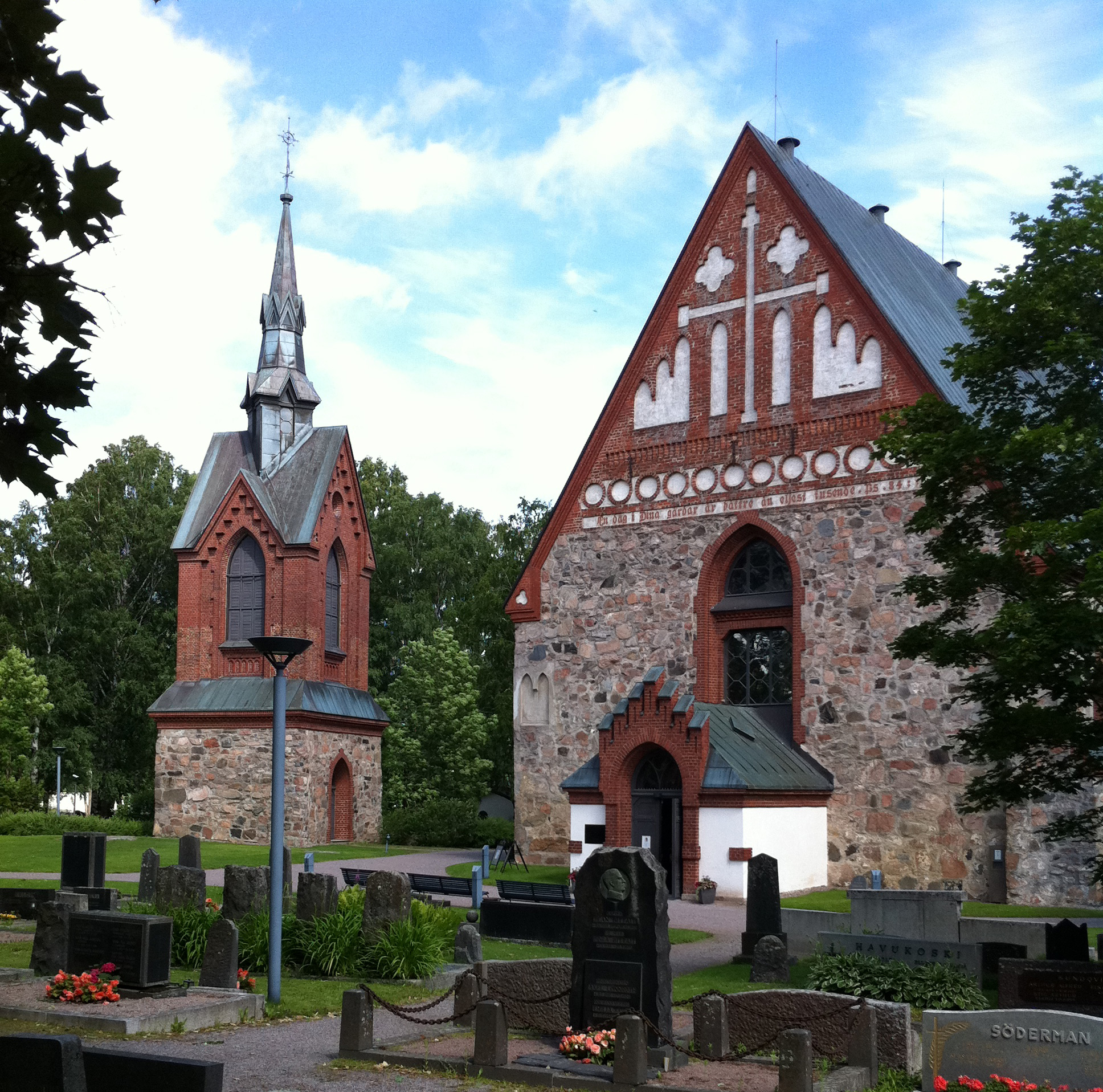
The Church of St. Lawrence (Finnish: Pyhän Laurin kirkko), the oldest church of Vantaa (c. 1460) in the Helsinki Parish Village

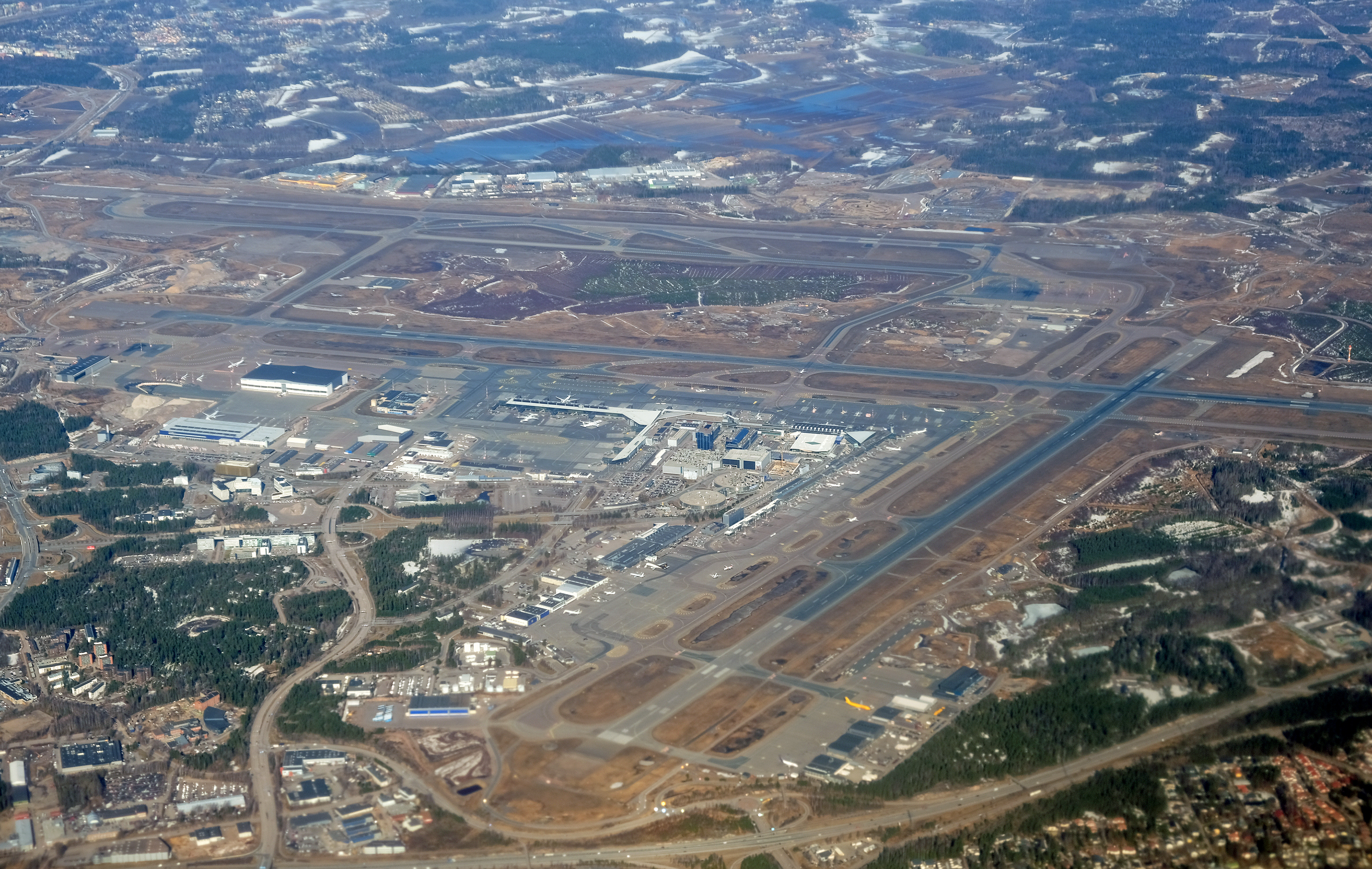
Aerial view of Helsinki Airport, located in Lentokenttä, Vantaa

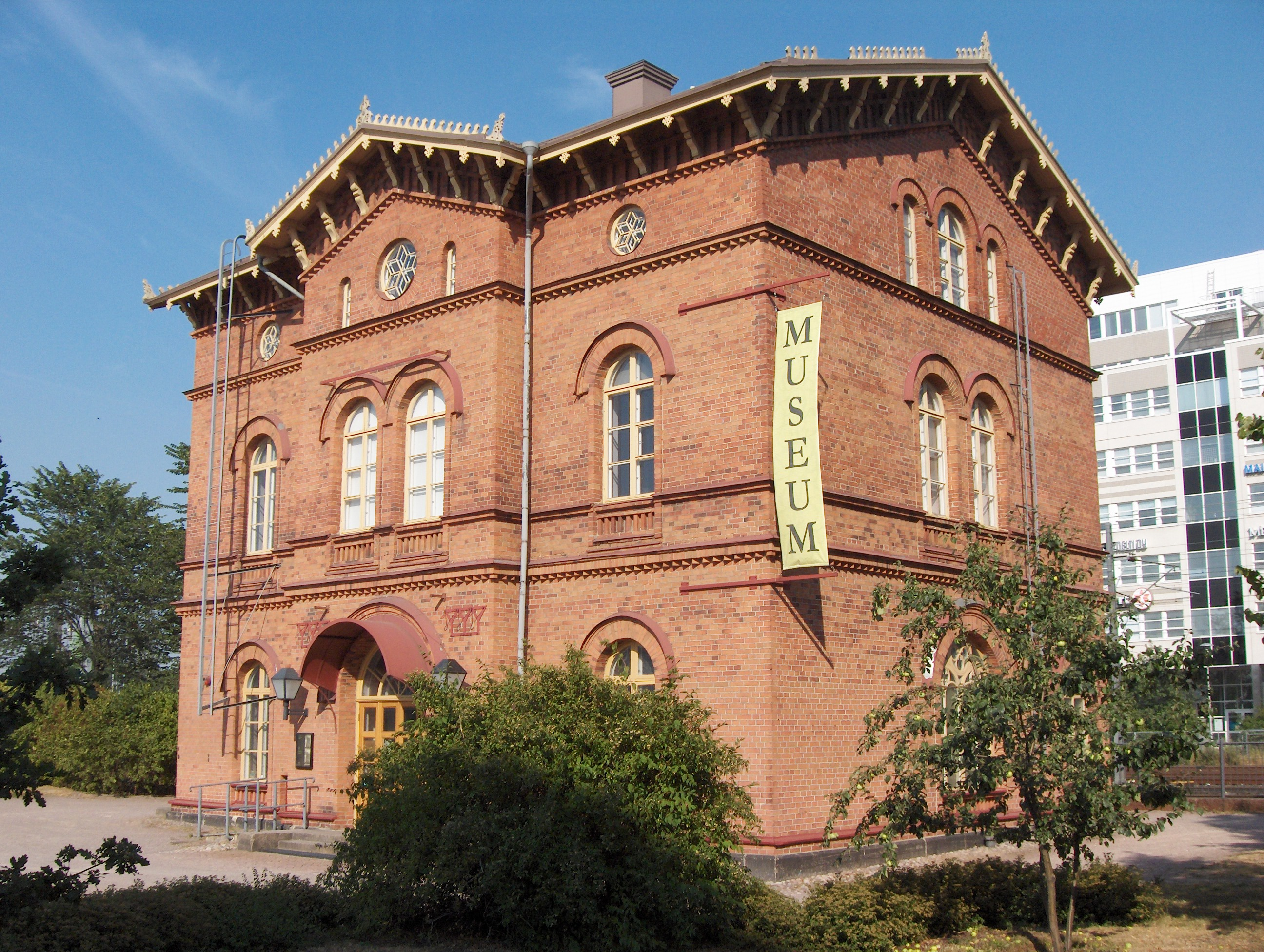
The old railway station building of Tikkurila, now a museum
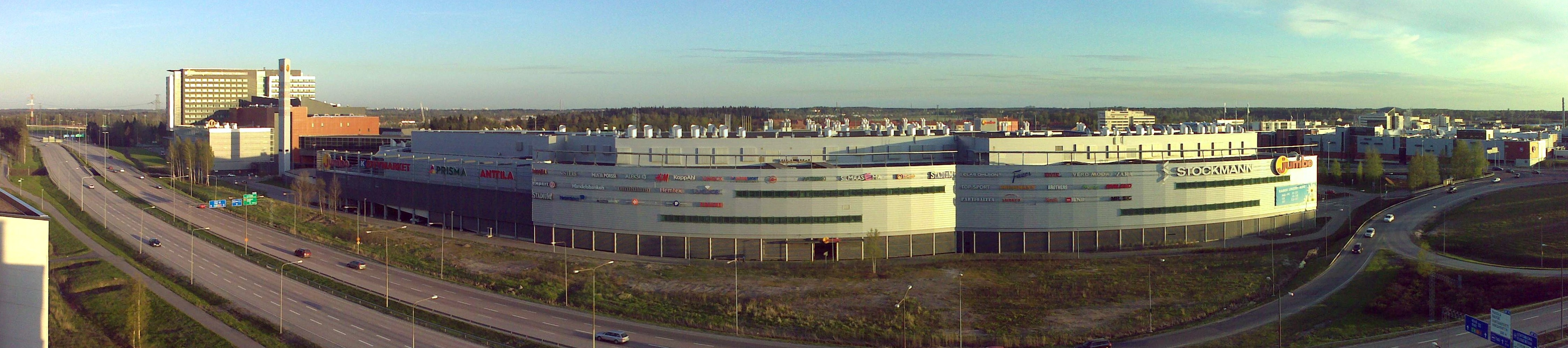
A panoramic view of Jumbo Shopping Centre in Aviapolis, Vantaa. Ring III runs through the foreground.

== See also ==
- People from Vantaa
- Districts of Vantaa
  - Aviapolis
  - Korso
  - Myyrmäki
  - Tikkurila
- Pro Vantaa

=== Features and services in Vantaa ===
- Ankkarock
- Flamingo Entertainment Centre
- Heureka
- Jumbo Shopping Centre
- Myyrmanni

=== Neighboring urban areas ===
- Hyrylä
- Kerava
- Klaukkala

=== Transport in Vantaa ===
- Ring III
- Ring Rail Line
- Tuusula Highway
