= Illegal construction =

Type of construction work

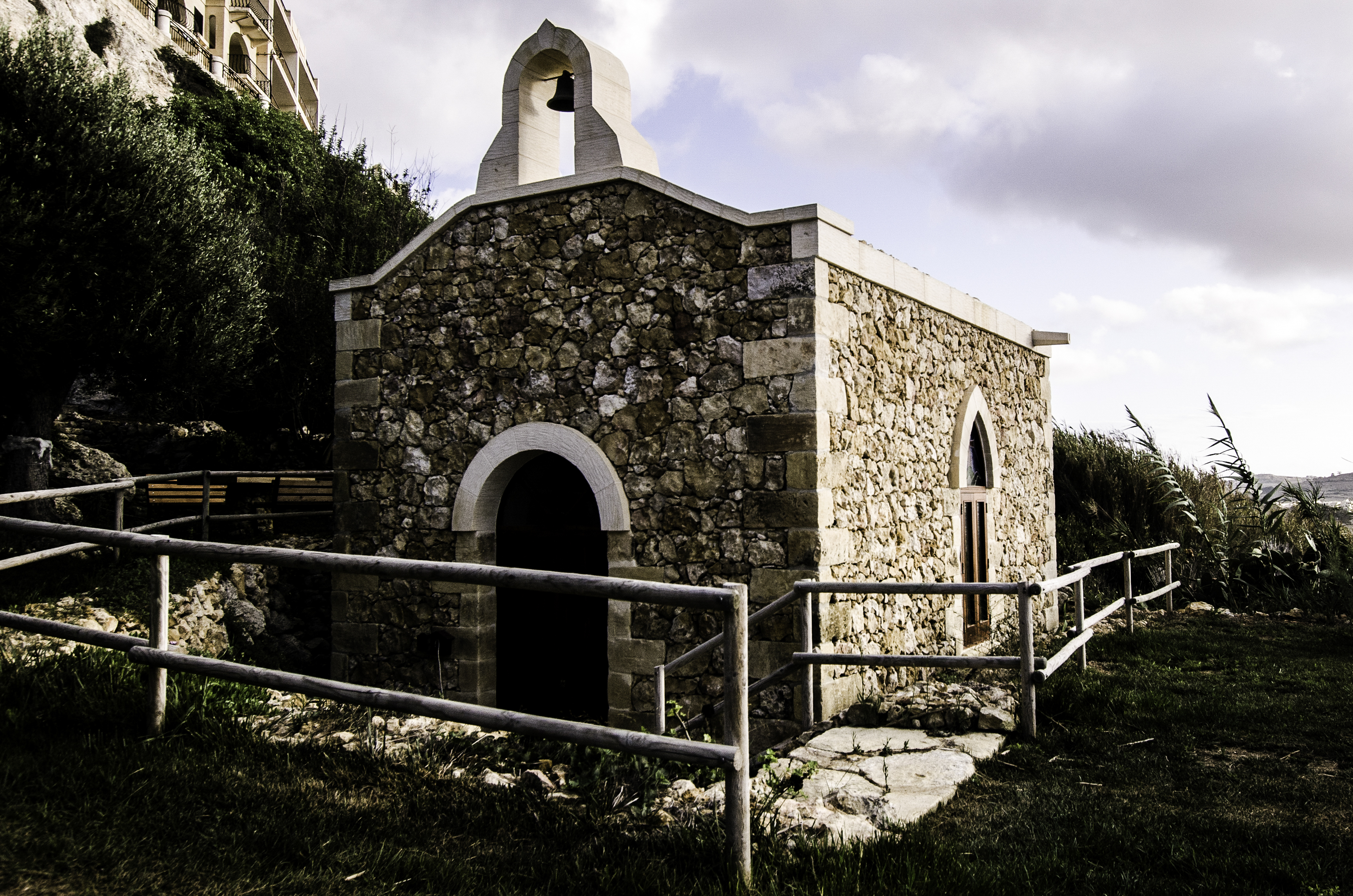
Private chapel in Żebbuġ, Gozo, Malta, constructed illegally as part of a residential development project

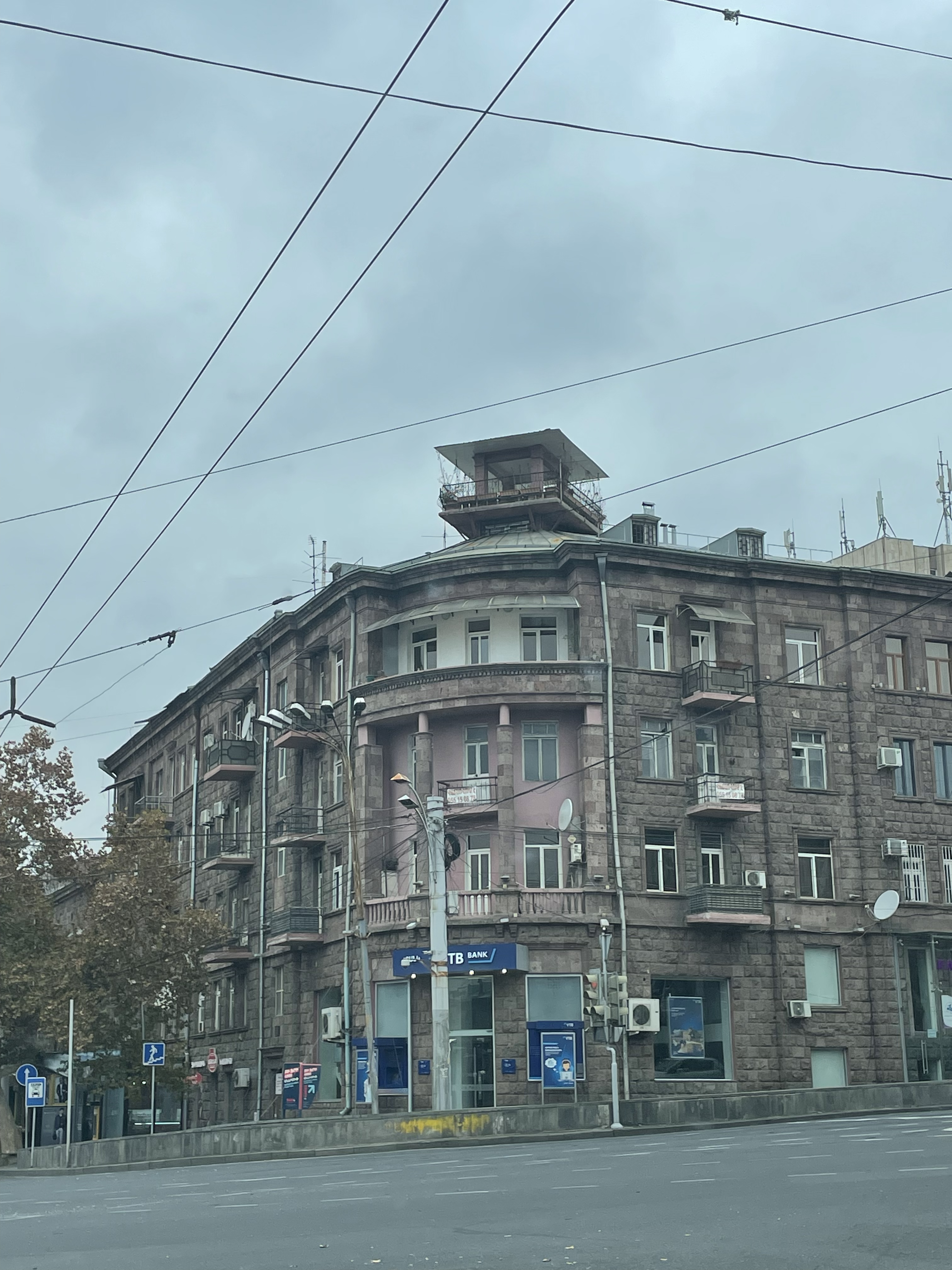
Illegal construction on the roof of a residential building in Yerevan, Armenia

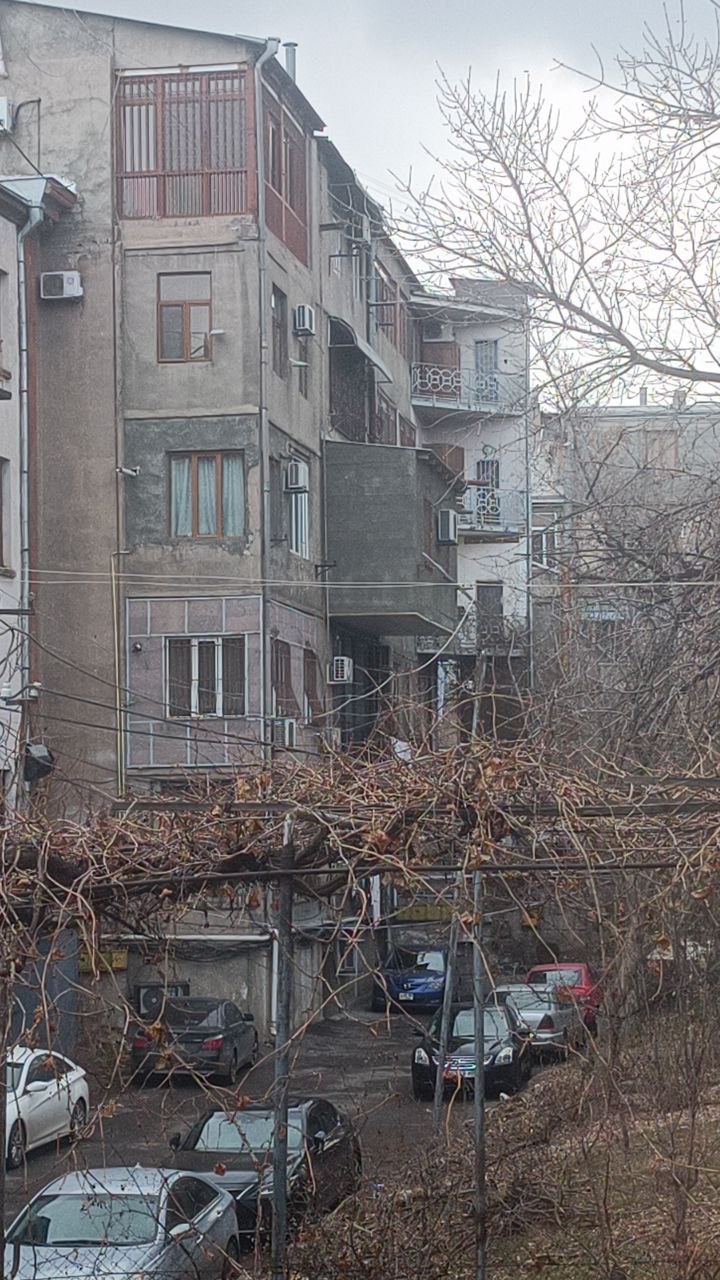
Illegal balcony attached to a residential building in Yerevan, Armenia

Illegal construction (also known as illegal building or illegal housing) is construction work (or the result of such) without a valid construction permit. Besides the potential technical hazards on uncontrolled construction sites and in finished buildings, illegal building activity can be a major environmental violation when the works encroach upon preserve areas like nature reserves. Likewise, illegal building can have serious political implications when it is practiced as landgrabbing or for illegal settling in foreign territories (see e.g. International law and Israeli settlements).

Illegal building can be the consequence of a combination of urbanization, overpopulation, homelessness and poverty in which case expanding slums, Shanty towns or similar will result. On the other hand, illegal building activity may be due to profitable speculation with and exploitation of valuable real property. Demand for mass tourism accommodation (hotels, etc.) as well as its counterpart, individualistic luxury retreats for the very rich are visible drivers of such speculation. Similar motivation may come from incentives connected with the illegal construction of great shopping malls or similar on greenfield land.

Even construction works with apparently valid permits can be a result of bribery.

In some cases it can be observed that legal or tolerated settlements are later declared illegal by governmental institutions in order to make room for more lucrative investments or simply for political demonstration purposes (see e.g. Operation Murambatsvina) sometimes under the pretext of beautification.

== Notable examples ==
An infamous example of organized illegal construction can be found in the so-called Sack of Palermo.

On the western edge of the Ilola district in Vantaa, Finland, there is an illegal village called Simosenkylä, where the houses are mainly dilapidated, some completely abandoned.

== Environmental risks ==
Increased landslide risk has been found to be associated with illegal building in hillside regions of densely populated urban areas in Italy and Bosnia and Herzegovina, because of loss of stabilizing vegetation by deforestation, etc.. Due to uncontrolled increase in impervious surface, the role of illegal construction has also been discussed in connection with flash floods (see 2011 European floods#Italy).

== Detection ==
In addition to human observation, large-scale screening for illegal building (activity) can also rely on remote sensing technology using satellite imagery (e.g. from EROS B, IRS-P5,...) and geospatial information systems.

== See also ==
- Favela
- Gecekondu
- Informal housing
- Urban sprawl
- Category:Illegal housing
  - Illegal housing in India
- Structural encroachment
- Accumulation by dispossession
- Lost, mislaid, and abandoned property
- Building boom
- Real estate boom
- Illegal logging
- Illegal mining
  - Sand mining
