= Ilola =

Ilola Gladas
- City District
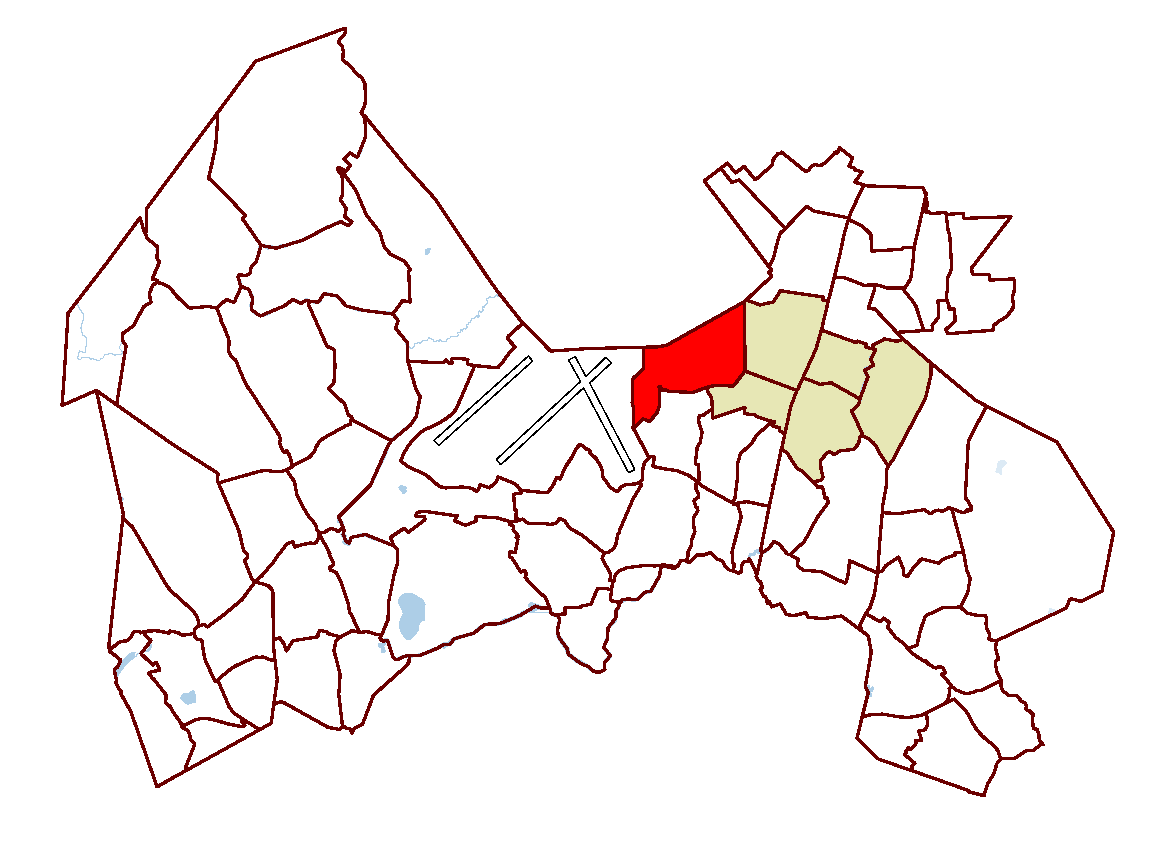
- Location on the map of Vantaa, with the district in red and the Koivukylä major region in light brown
- Coordinates: 60°19′44″N 25°00′50″E
- Country: Finland
- City: Vantaa
- Major region: Koivukylä

Area
  - Total: 3.9 km^{2} (1.5 sq mi)

Population (1.1.2014)
  - Total: 4,578
  - Density: 1,200/km^{2} (3,000/sq mi)
- Time zone: GMT +2
- Postal Code(s): 01390

Ilola (Swedish: Gladas) is a city district of the municipality of Vantaa, Finland. It is located in the northern part of the administrative district of Koivukylä. It is bordered to the west by the district of Lentokenttä, to the south by Ruskeasanta, to the east by Asola, and to the north by the municipality of Tuusula. Ilola has a population of 4,578 (as of 1.1.2014), and its housing is mostly owner-occupied separate and terraced houses, with an average size particularly high for Vantaa, at 90 square metres (970 sq ft). The district was primarily developed in the 1980s and 1990s, when it was one of Vantaa's fastest growing districts.

== See also ==
- Simosenkylä – Illegal village in Vantaa, Finland
