= Aviapolis =

- Major Region of Vantaa
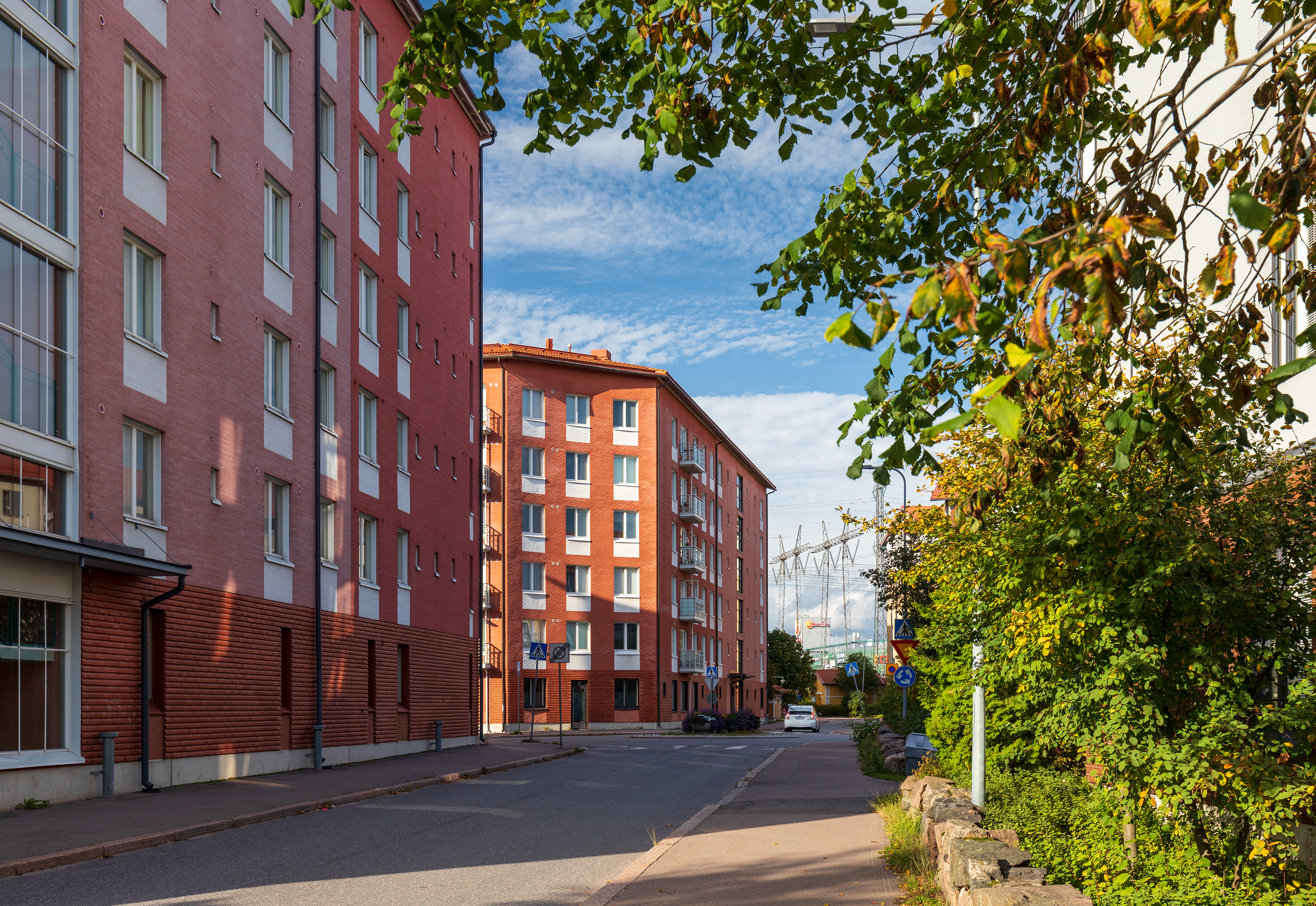
- Apartment buildings along the Pehtoorintie street in Pakkala, Aviapolis, Vantaa

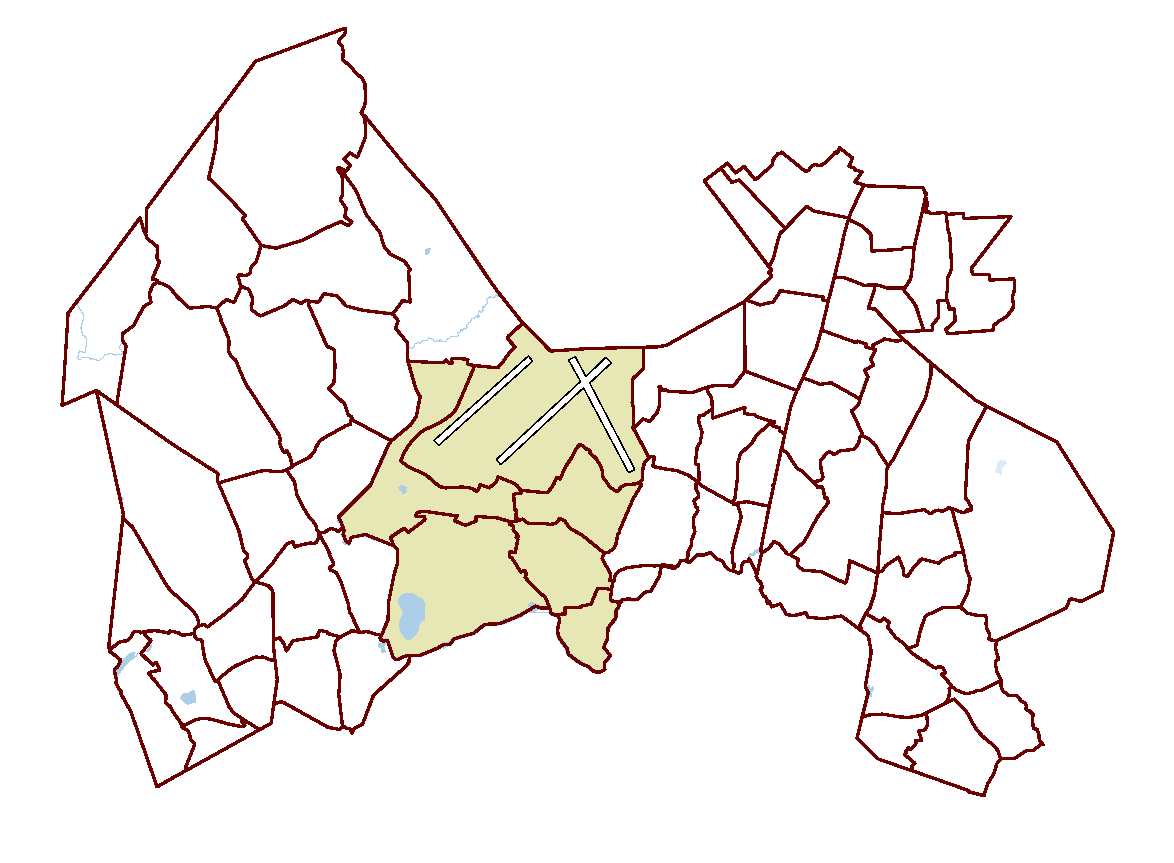
- The Aviapolis major region in Vantaa
- Coordinates: 60°18′N 24°57′E
- Country: Finland
- City: Vantaa

Area
  - Total: 38.0 km^{2} (14.7 sq mi)

Population (1 January 2014)
  - Total: 18,327
  - Density: 482/km^{2} (1,250/sq mi)
- Time zone: GMT +2
- Postal Code(s): 01510, 01520, 01530, 01690, 01740
- Website: www.vantaa.fi/frontpage

Aviapolis is a business, retail, entertainment, and housing marketing brand area in central Vantaa, Finland, covering roughly 40 square kilometres (15 sq mi), including Finland's main airline hub and airport, Helsinki Airport.

The term is officially used as the name of one of the major regions of Vantaa, encompassing the districts of Lentokenttä, Pakkala, Tammisto, Veromies, Viinikkala, and Ylästö. It is Vantaa's only major region not named after a city district.

== Business ==
Currently Aviapolis is referred to as the most popular business site in Greater Helsinki, surpassing even the Helsinki City center. Businesses districts in Aviapolis include Technopolis Technology Park, Airport Plaza Business Park Oy, and the WTC Helsinki Airport.

== Transport ==
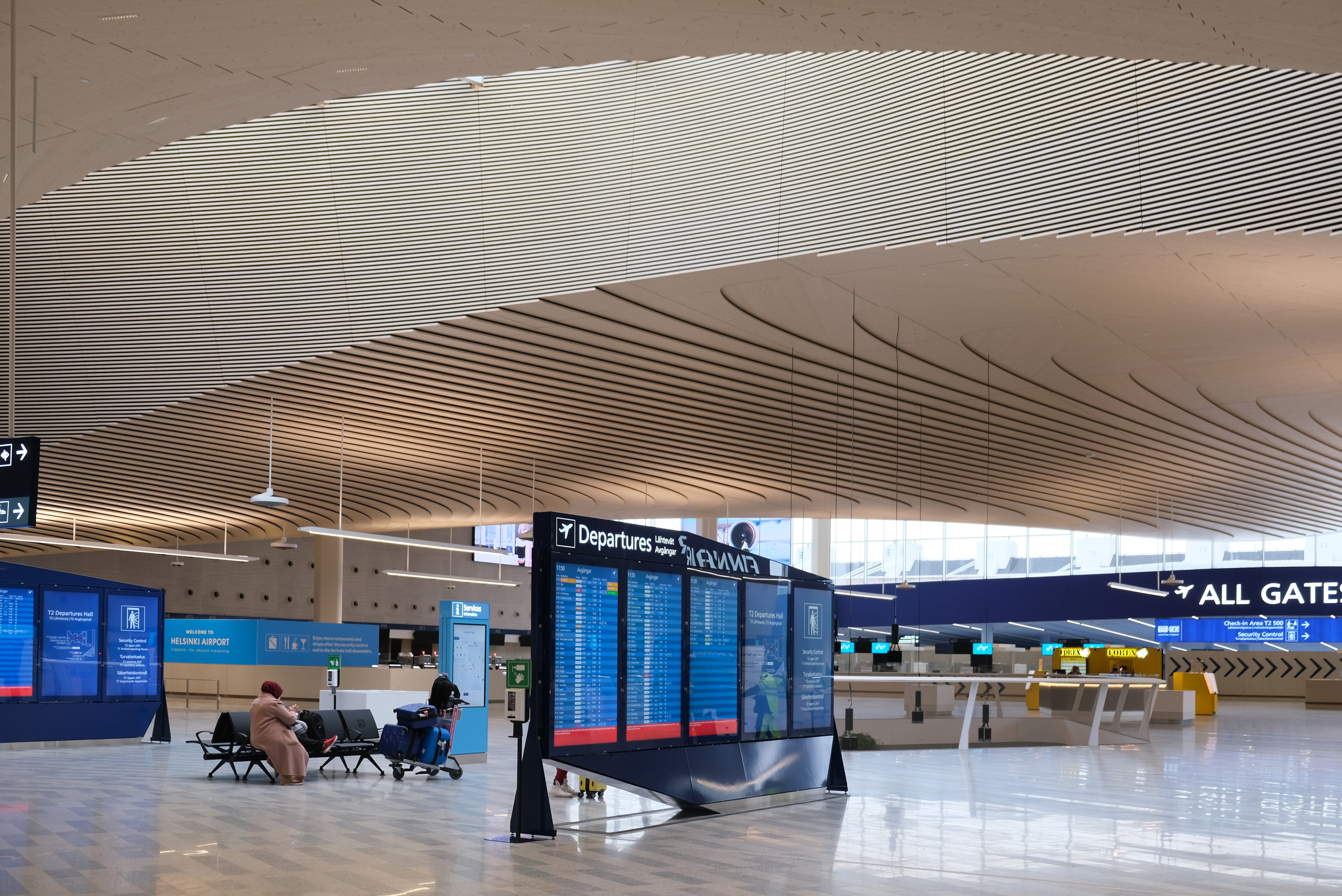
Helsinki Airport

Having Finland's largest airport, Helsinki Airport, the international connections of Aviapolis are broad, boasting the shortest flying distances from the EU to many Asian destinations.

The Ring III beltway going through the Aviapolis area connects it with all main highways in and out of the Helsinki Metropolitan Area. Several bus lines connect the airport both to many Finnish cities as well as to many suburbs in Helsinki, Espoo, and Vantaa.

Aviapolis and the airport are linked by the Ring Rail Line to the main railway line, downtown Helsinki, and suburbs of western and eastern Vantaa. The line opened in July 2015, with two stations in the area: Aviapolis railway station and Airport railway station.

Public transportation in and out of the area is also done through Helsinki Regional Transport Authority bus connections.

== Retail ==
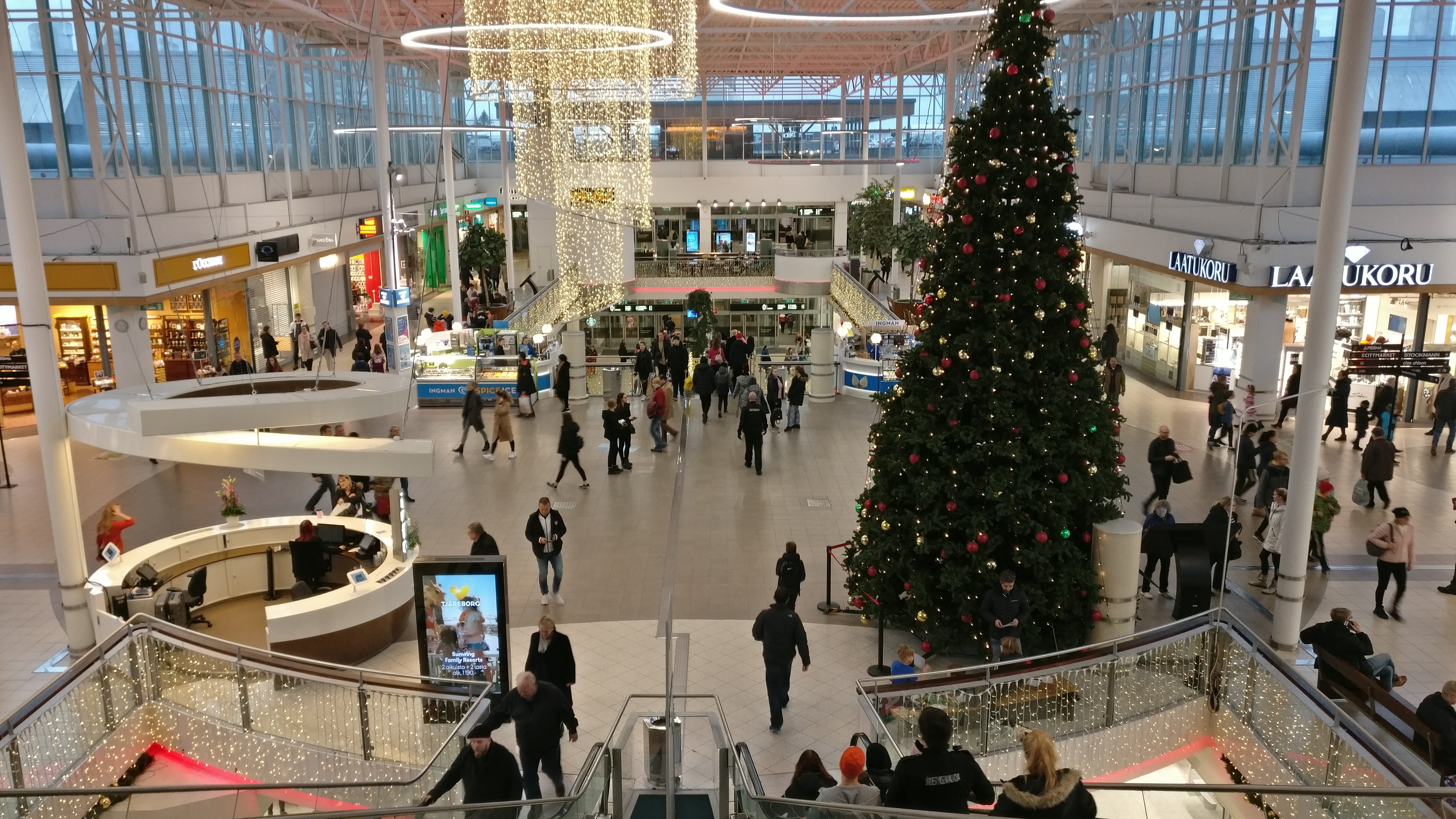
Jumbo shopping centre

Central Aviapolis holds Jumbo Shopping Centre, which is Finland's fourth largest shopping center, with an adjacent entertainment center Flamingo that began operating in 2008.

== Housing ==
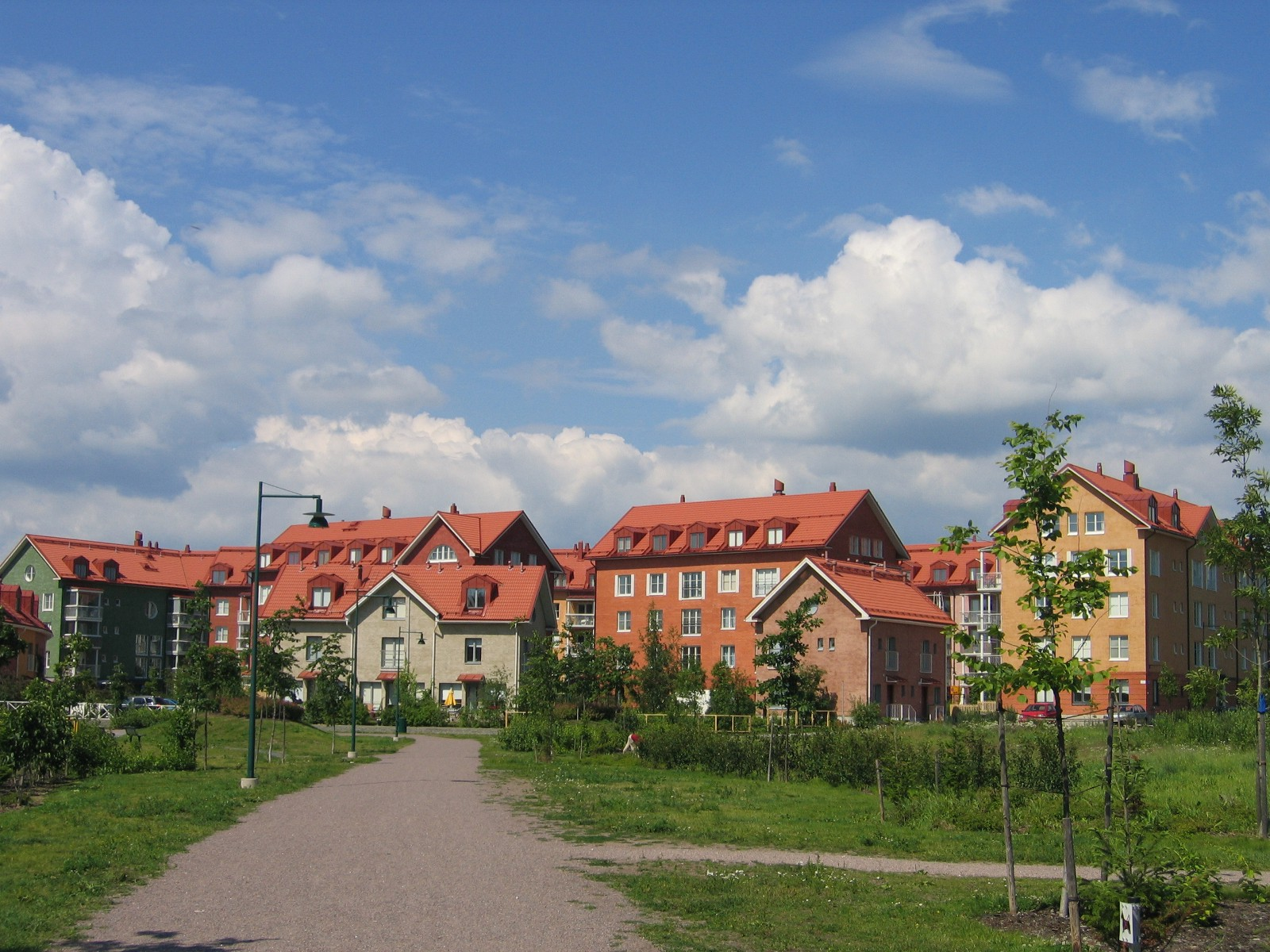
Kartanonkoski Housing District

The Aviapolis area includes, among others, the Kartanonkoski housing district, located in Pakkala, which houses the International School of Vantaa. The Helsinki Central Park is situated south of the district, in the neighboring capital city.

== See also ==
- Tikkurila
