= Veromies =

Veromies Skattmans
- City District
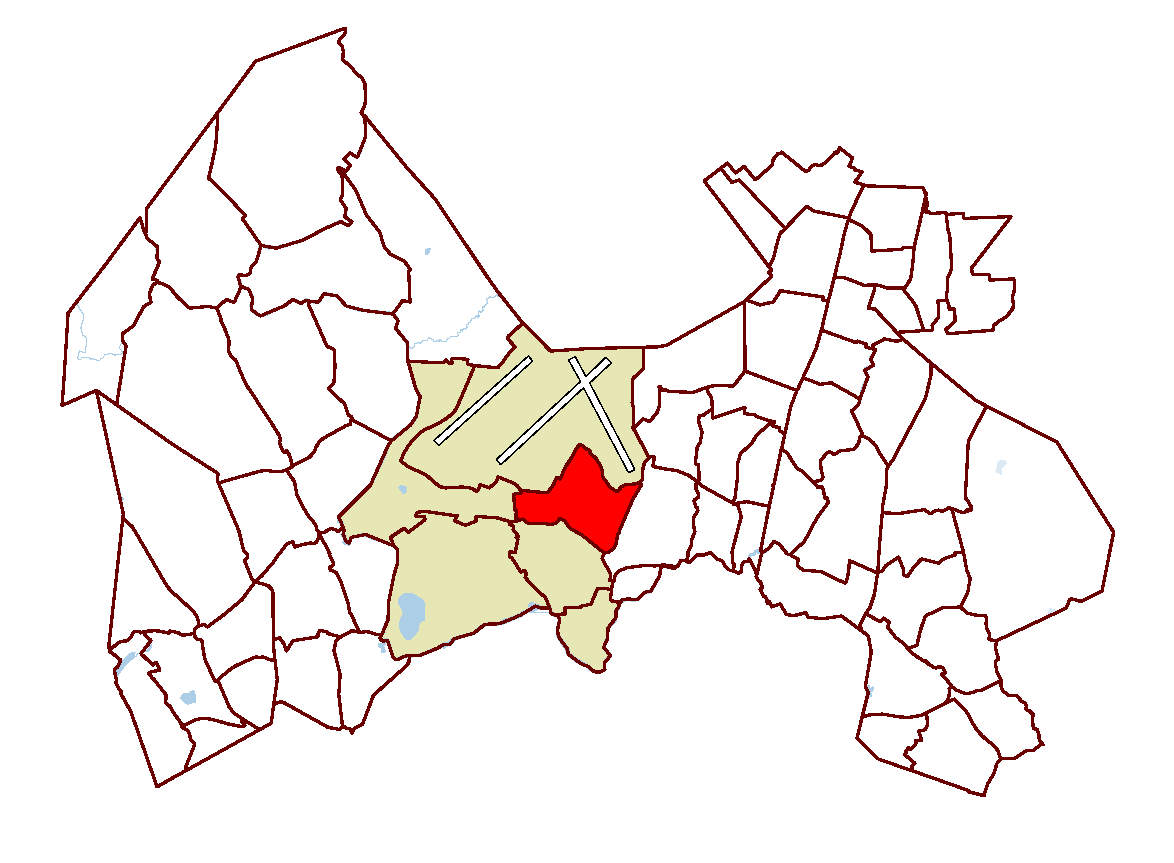
- Location on the map of Vantaa
- Coordinates: 60°17′50″N 24°57′50″E
- Country: Finland
- City: Vantaa
- Major region: Aviapolis

Area
  - Total: 3.5 km^{2} (1.4 sq mi)

Population (1.1.2014)
  - Total: 528
  - Density: 150/km^{2} (390/sq mi)
- Time zone: GMT +2
- Postal Code(s): 01510, 01530
- Website: web.archive.org/web/20150206121229/http://www.vantaa.fi:80/frontpage

Veromies (Swedish: Skattmans) (meaning "taxman") is a city district in Vantaa, Finland. It is located in southeastern Vantaa, in the Aviapolis major region. It is situated south of Helsinki Airport and west of the Tuusulanväylä highway. To the south, Veromies borders the Pakkala district, separated by the Ring III (Finnish: Kehä III) beltway. It also borders the Viinikkala district to the west.

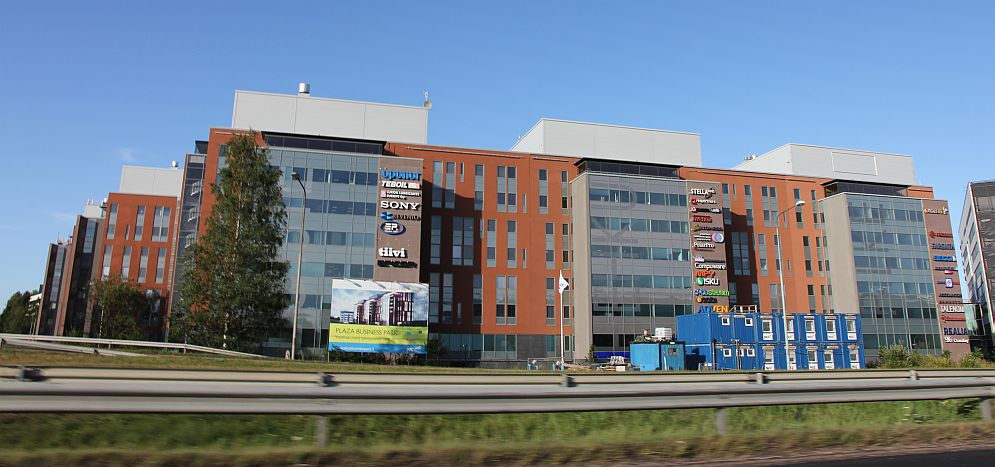
Offices in Veromies

The population of Veromies is 528 (1.1.2014), putting it among the lesser populated districts in Vantaa. Its total area is 3.5 square kilometres (1.4 sq mi), giving it a population density of 150 inhabitants per square kilometre (390/sq mi).

The Veromies district includes small-scale industry, office buildings, and three hotels. The western side of the road Lentoasemantie has recently been named Virkamies (Swedish: Tjänstemans), meaning "public official".
