= Ruskeasanta =

Ruskeasanta Rödsand
- City District
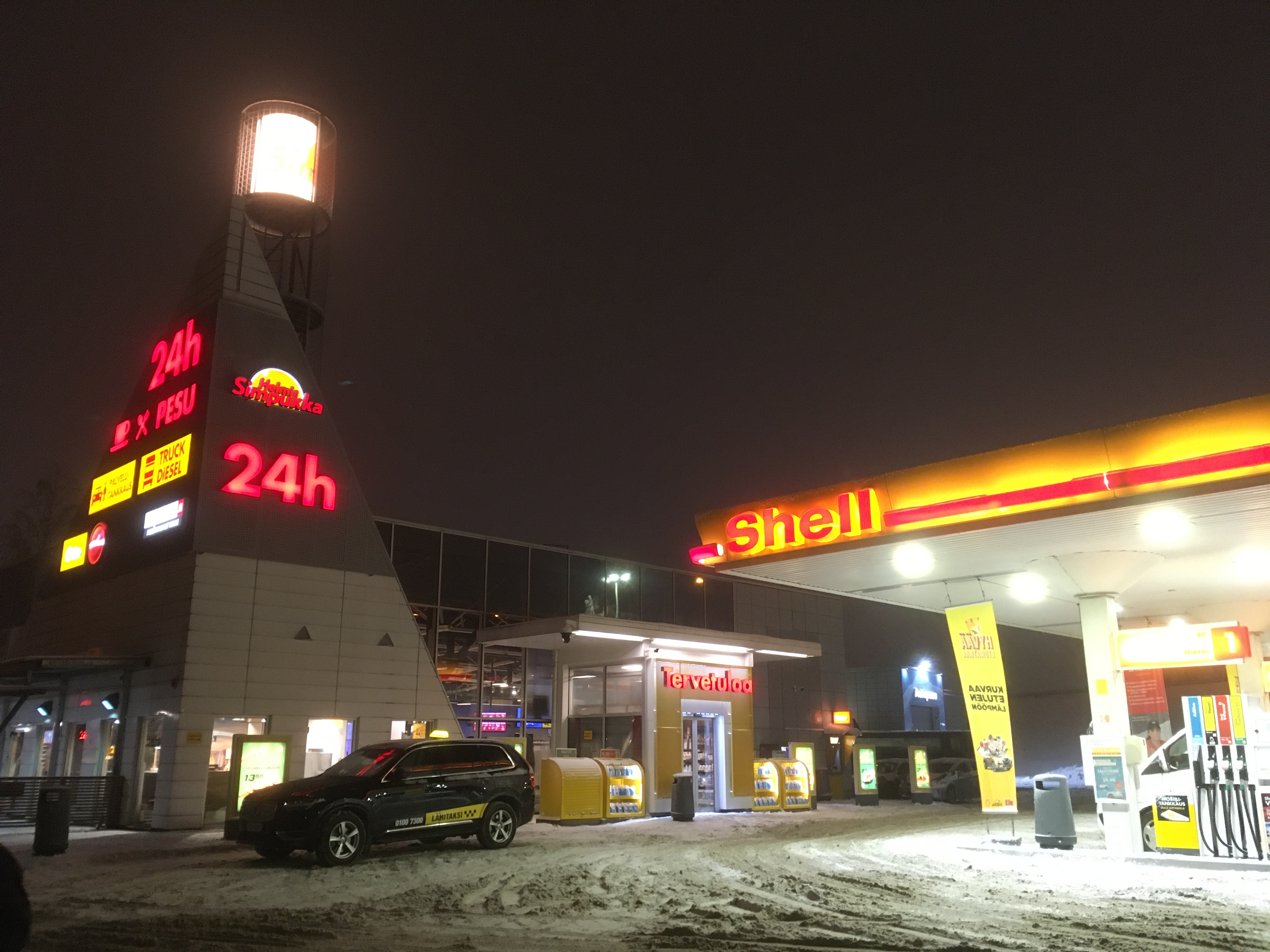
- Shell filling station in Ruskeasanta

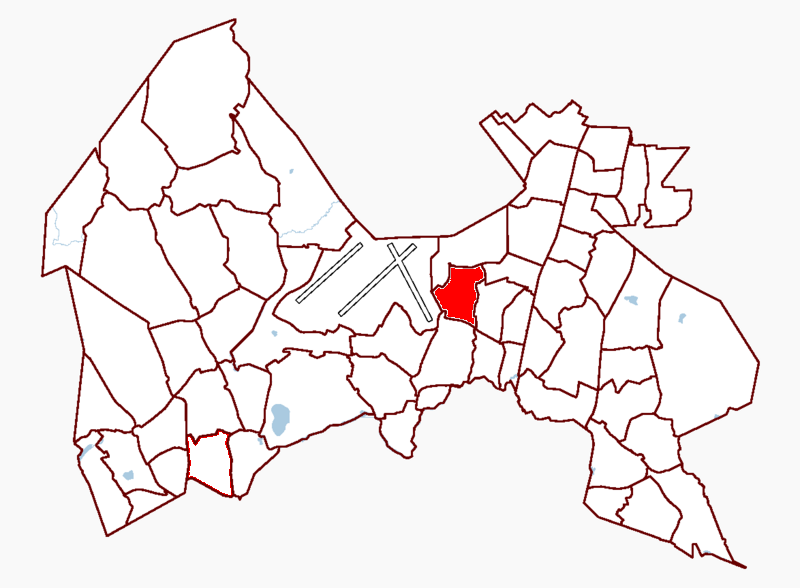
- Location on the map of Vantaa, with the district in red.
- Coordinates: 60°18′35.87″N 25°00′12.49″E
- Country: Finland
- City: Vantaa
- Major region: Tikkurila

Area
  - Total: 2.4 km^{2} (0.93 sq mi)

Population (1.1.2021)
  - Total: 4,163
  - Density: 1,700/km^{2} (4,500/sq mi)
- Time zone: GMT +2
- Postal Code(s): 01390, 01391, (01300)
- Website: www.vantaa.fi/frontpage/

Ruskeasanta (Finnish: [ˈruskeɑˌsɑntɑ]; Swedish: Rödsand (Note: The Finnish name literally means "brown sand", while the Swedish name means "red sand".)) is a city district in Vantaa, Finland. It is part of the Tikkurila major region, located about 5 kilometres (3.1 mi) east of the Helsinki Airport. The district is known mainly as a residential area preferred by families with children.

There are approximately 320 jobs in Ruskeasanta, most of them in the service sector. Services in the area include a convenience store, hair salon, pizzeria, restaurant-pub, and a filling station near the Highway 45 which is open around the clock. Ruskeasanta's attractions also include the Ruskeasanta cemetery, which houses the nationally significant log chapel from 1927, designed by Armas Lindgren.

Finnish pop singer Käärijä, who represented Finland in the 2023 Eurovision Song Contest, is from Ruskeasanta.

== See also ==
- Aviapolis
- Tikkurila
