= Viertola =

Viertola Bäckby
- City District
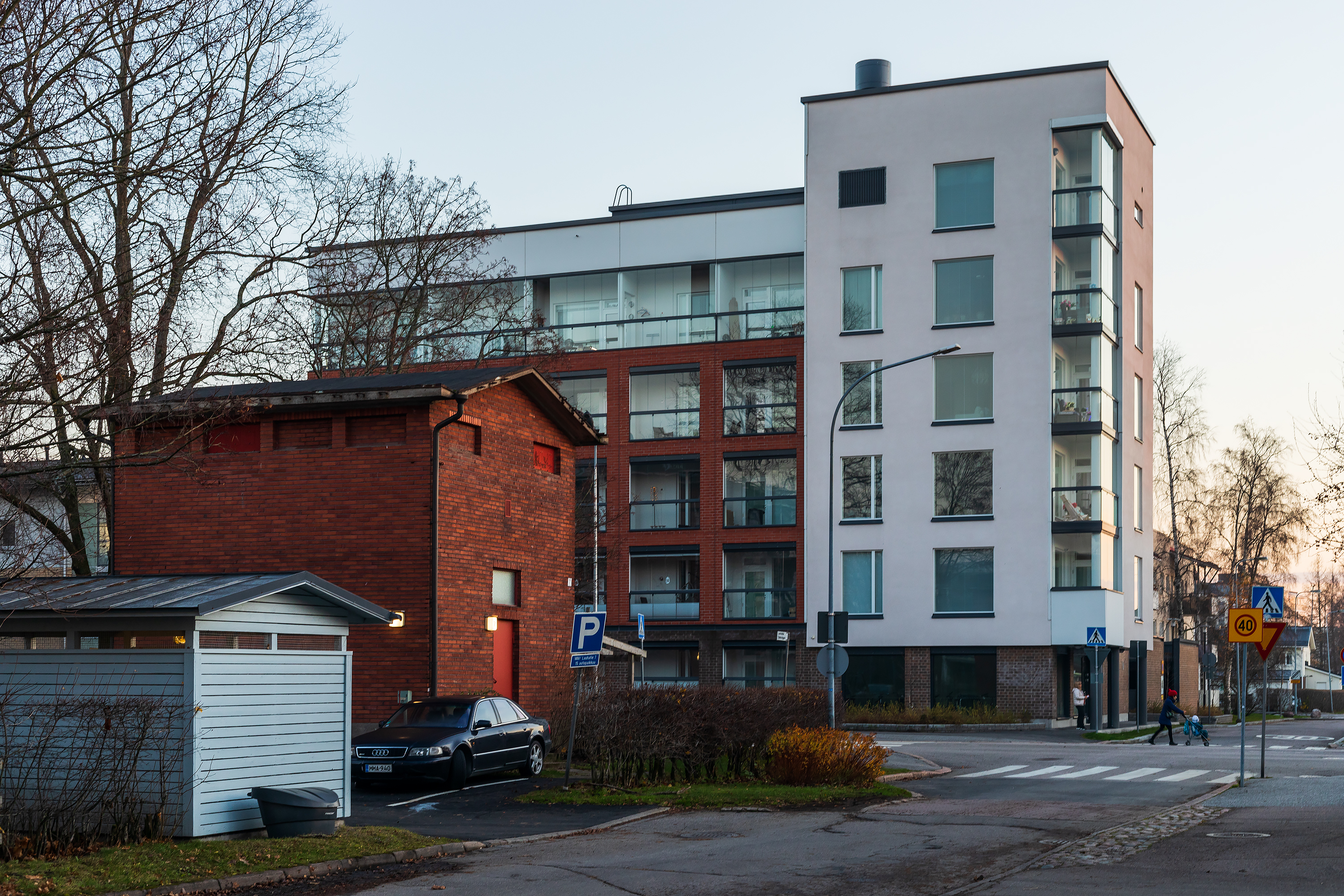
- Residential by Lauhatie and Peltolantie in Viertola
- Etymology: Finnish: viertol ("to rotate")
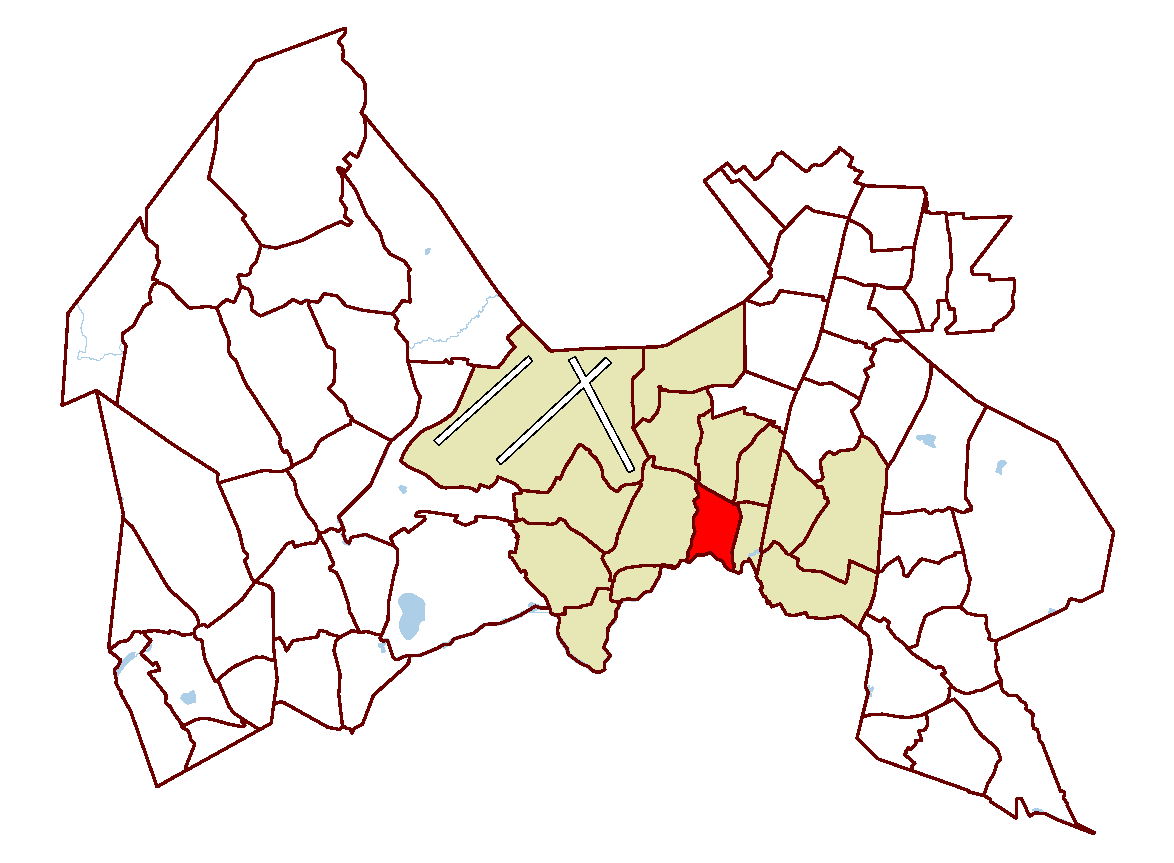
- Location on the map of Vantaa, with the district in red and the Tikkurila major region in light brown
- Coordinates: 60°17′37″N 25°1′30″E
- Country: Finland
- City: Vantaa
- Major region: Tikkurila

Area
  - Total: 1.6 km^{2} (0.62 sq mi)

Population (1.1.2020)
  - Total: 7,700
  - Density: 4,800/km^{2} (12,000/sq mi)
- Time zone: GMT +2
- Postal Code(s): 01300
- Website: www.vantaa.fi/en

Viertola (Swedish: Bäckby) is a district in Vantaa, Finland, located in the center of the Tikkurila district. The district has a population of approximately 7,700 (as of 2020), making it the most populated neighbourhood of the Tikkurila major region. It is said to be a part of the center of the major region, alongside Tikkurila.

The majoritiy of the buildings in Viertola are apartment complexes, with over 1,200 apartment buildings constructed in the district from 2000 - 2017. Despite this, there are only 1,260 jobs in the area, making it a largely residential area.

== History ==
The 14th century mailing route King's road once passed through Viertola during the time it was used. The region began to see development during the 1950s, with detached houses being constructed, with the 1980s seeing rapid growth in this field. At the dawn of the 21st century, this growth was repeated once more, however this time with apartment complexes.

== See also ==
- Viertola school shooting
