= Pakkala =

Pakkala Backas
- City District
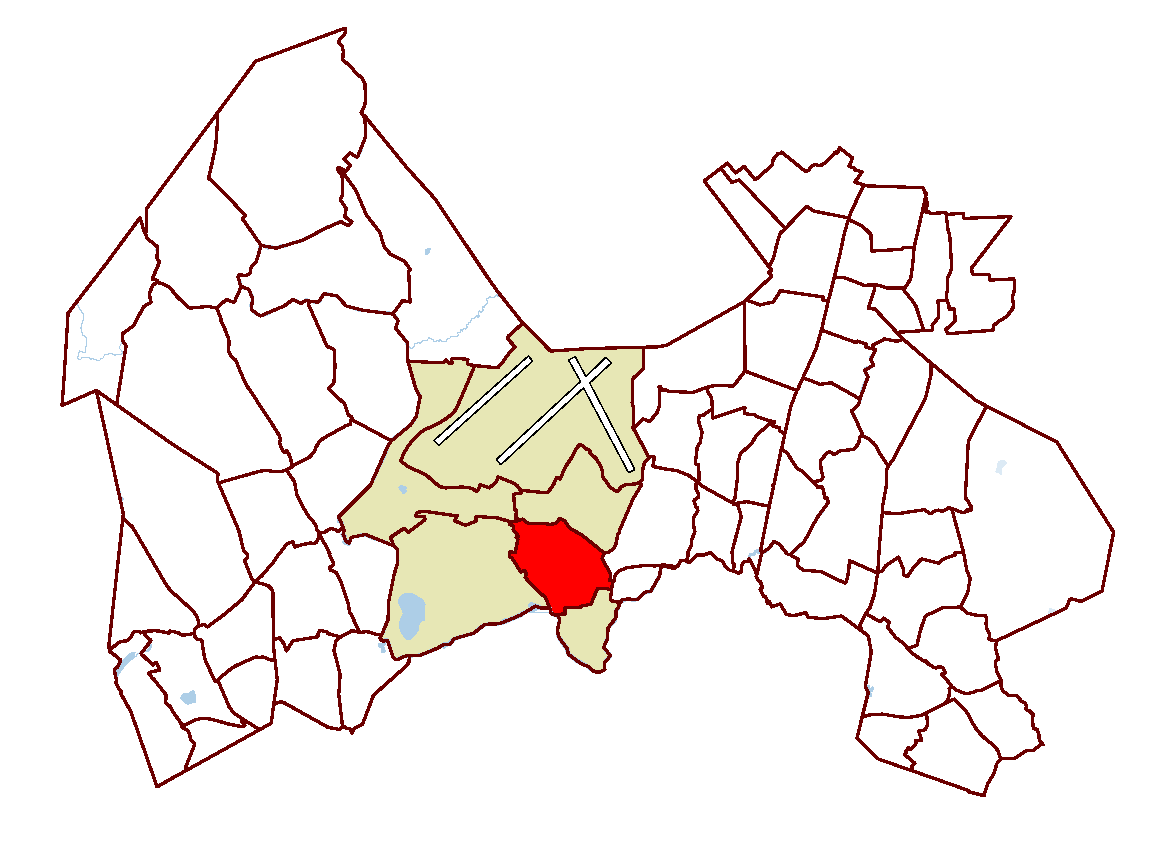
- Location on the map of Vantaa, with the district in red and the Aviapolis major region in light brown
- Coordinates: 60°17′13″N 24°57′08″E
- Country: Finland
- City: Vantaa
- Major region: Aviapolis

Area
  - Total: 3.5 km^{2} (1.4 sq mi)

Population (1.1.2014)
  - Total: 9,509
  - Density: 2,700/km^{2} (7,000/sq mi)
- Time zone: GMT +2
- Postal Code(s): 01510, 01520
- Website: www.vantaa.fi/frontpage/

Pakkala (Swedish: Backas) is a city district in Vantaa, Finland. It is the most populated district in the Aviapolis major region, and is named after the Backas estate situated there. Pakkala is notable for the suburb of Kartanonkoski and the business park of Vantaanportti, which includes both Jumbo Shopping Centre and the Flamingo entertainment center.

== Housing ==
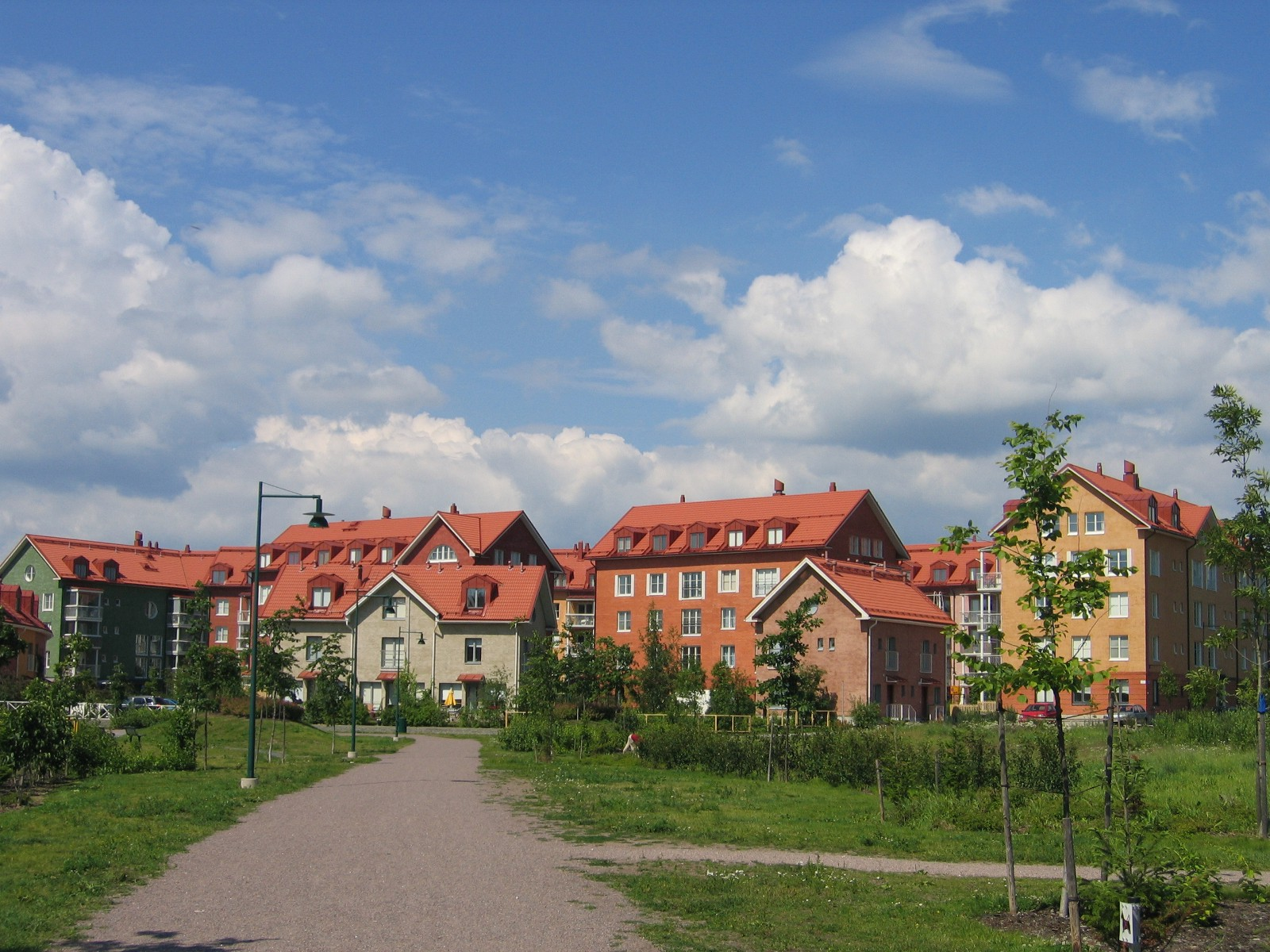
Kartanonkoski suburb

In 2014, Pakkala had a population of 9,509, which had grown from a mere 416 in 1990. The reason for rapid growth was the construction of suburbs in the area, particularly that of Kartanonkoski. Although officially a part of Pakkala, the suburb and its surrounding area is often referred to as simply "Kartanonkoski" for marketing purposes.

Kartanonkoski came about as a result of a 1998 competition organized by the City of Vantaa for the planning of a "garden village". The winner was the Swedish architectural firm Djurgårdsstadens arkitekter, who derived the concept from the Garden city movement in Britain at the end of the 19th century, as well as the New Urbanism movement at the time of its inception. The suburb consists of brightly colored houses and apartment blocks arranged primarily in terraces, with emphasis on local parks and landscape architecture.

With its total land area of 3.5 square kilometres (1.4 sq mi), Pakkala has an overall population density of about 2,700 inhabitants per square kilometre (7,000/sq mi).

== Business ==
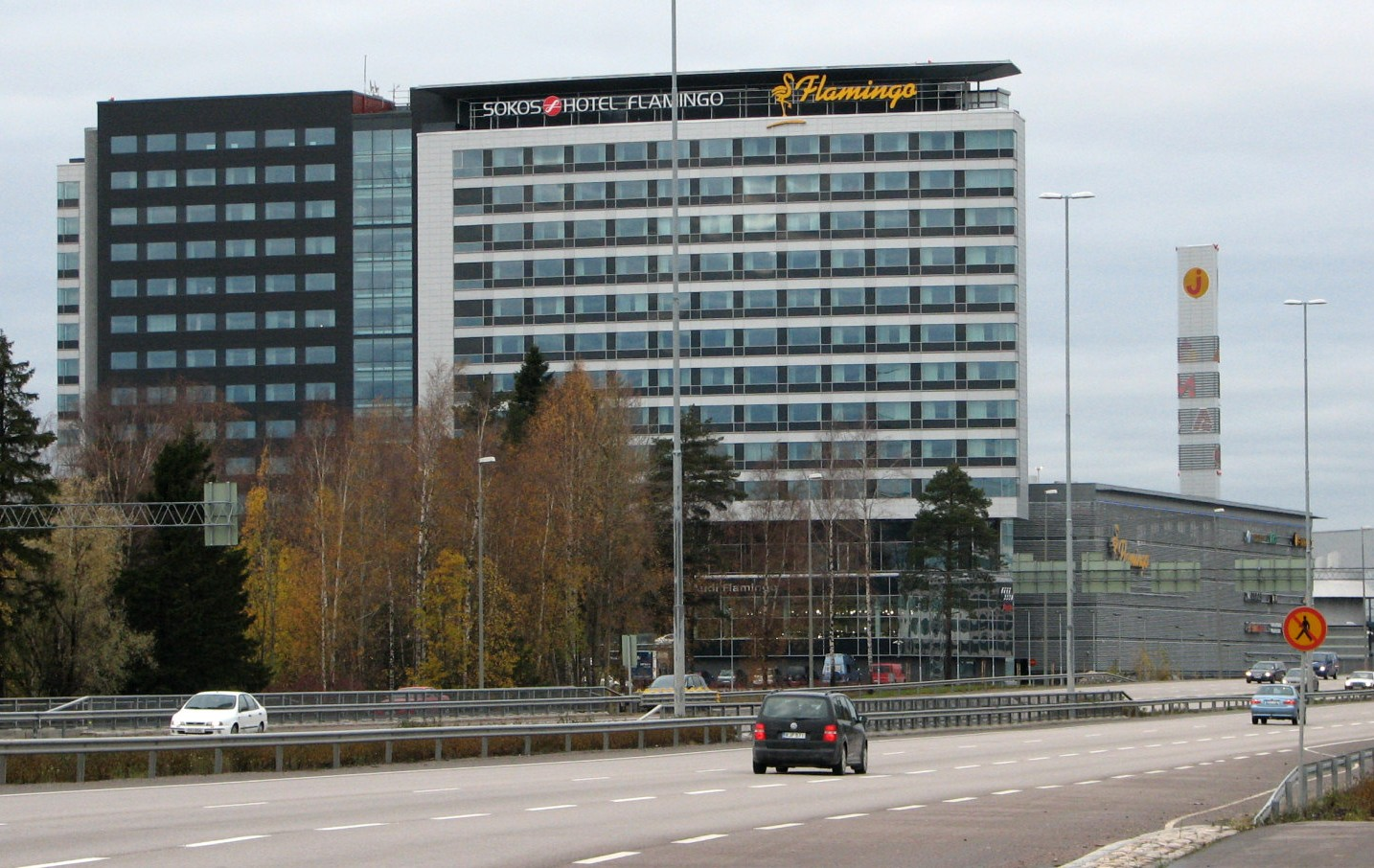
Entertainment centre Flamingo, with Jumbo Shopping Centre in the background

Pakkala encapsulates the business park of Vantaanportti, which mostly hosts operations for constituents of the Finnish food industry such as HKScan, Finn-Catering, and Vaasan & Vaasan. Most notably, however, Finland's second largest shopping center, Jumbo Shopping Centre, is located there. Since expansions finished in 2005, Jumbo has boasted a floor area of 85,000 square metres (910,000 sq ft) and about 4,500 parking spaces. In 2008, entertainment center Flamingo finished construction next to Jumbo. It includes a hotel, a spa, a cinema, and other entertainment services.

== Services ==
Pakkala Learning and Information Centre (POINT) acts as a concentration of most of Pakkala's public services; specifically, it includes the International School of Vantaa (ISV) (Finnish: Vantaan Kansainvälinen Koulu), the Y.E.S. day care center, and the Point Library. Prior to 2010, POINT also hosted a tourism and Helsinki City Transport info center.
