= HKScan =

Finnish meat production company

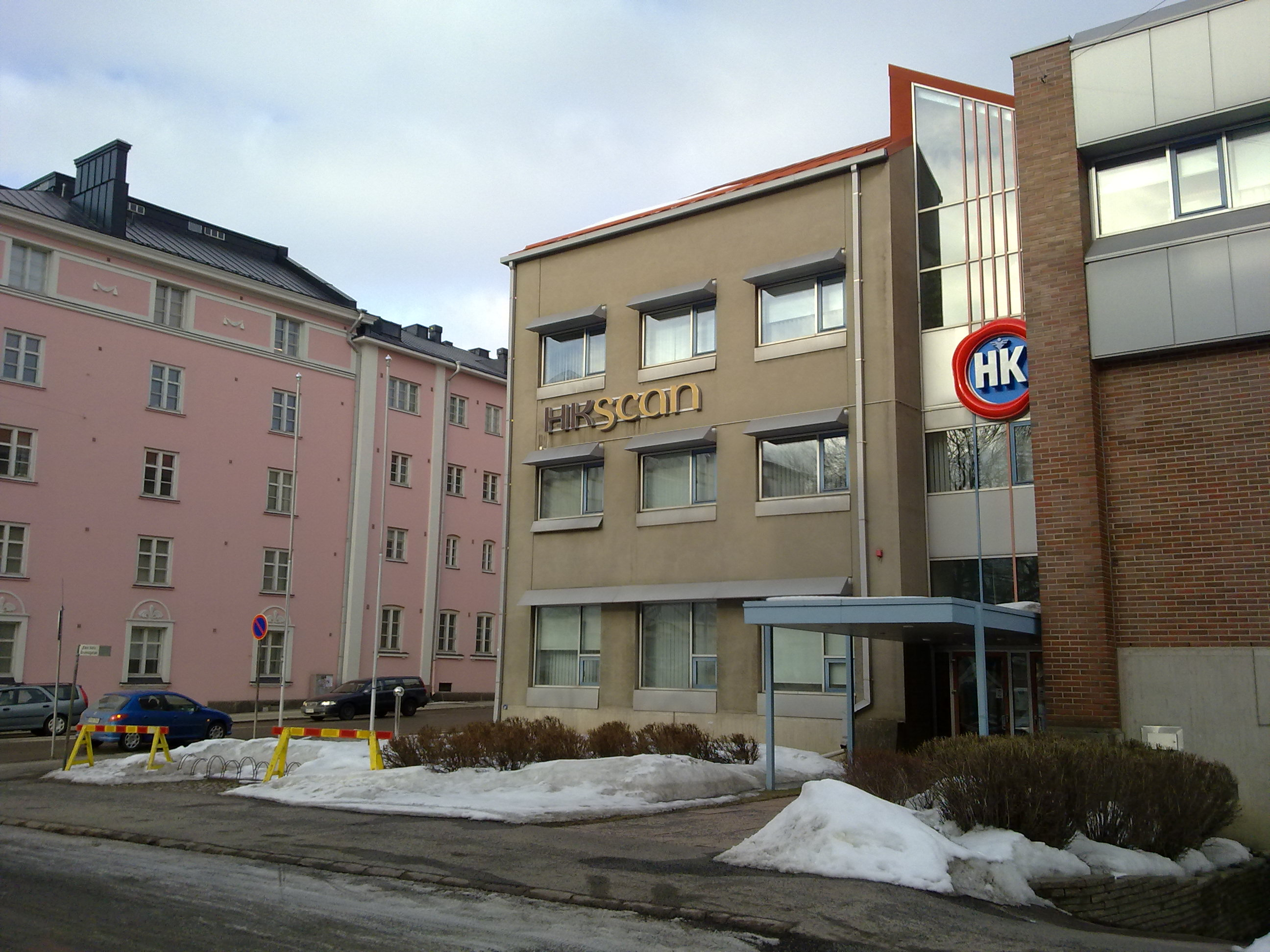
HKFoods (previous HKScan) corporate HQ in Turku, Finland.

HKFoods Plc (Nasdaq Helsinki: HKFOODS) is a Finnish manufacturer of meat foods and products, but nowadays its product range also includes ready meals. The HQ is based in Turku. In the 1990s and 2000s the company – by then known as HK Ruokatalo Oy – targeted the international market, acquiring meat production companies around the Baltic Sea: In Sweden, Poland, Estonia, Latvia and Lithuania – including the Swedish Scan AB in 2007, resulting in the modern-day name of the company.

HK is originally an initialism of Helsingin Kauppiaat ("Helsinki Merchants"), a company that was acquired by LSO in 1991. HK is the best known brand of the company in Finland.

HKScan Corporation's new name HKFoods Plc was registered in the Trade Register on 24 May 2024. HKFoods is the fifth largest food manufacturer in Europe and a company listed in the Helsinki Stock Exchange.

== History ==
Text in this section is largely based on a translation of the company's history page

The history of the company in its current form traces back to the year 1913, when a number of farmers founded the co-operative slaughterhouse of South-Western Finland (LSO – Lounais-Suomen Osuusteurastamo, or nowadays LSO-Osuuskunta Oy, a subsidiary of HK Ruokatalo Oy responsible for attaining the livestock in Finland). The company was successful in domestic meat wholesales.

More local co-operative meat producers joined LSO during the 1960s, 1970s and 1980s. A big reorganization took place in the Finnish meat products market in 1981 and 1985 when SOK and OTK – both large retailing co-operatives – gave up their own meat industries. This naturally led to major increase in LSO's market share.

During the early 1990s LSO acquired other domestic food manufacturers: Helsingin Kauppiaat Oy in 1991 and Kariniemi Oy in 1993. Helsingin Kauppiaat was a meat producer with a factory located in Helsinki's suburb Sörnäinen at the time. Its products included the well-recognized Sininen Lenkki sausage. Kariniemi was a producer of chicken meat. Sörnäinen area is still active (as of 2010) in meat production and wholesale business, spotting Helsingin Tukku wholesaler and Chef Wotkin's meathouse, but all the functions of the original HK factory, including the production of Sininen Lenkki, have moved to a new factory in Pakkala, Vantaa.

The company started foreign expansion in 1998, when it bought the majority of shares in the Estonian Rakvere Lihakombinaat, a previously state-owned but later privatized food producer. More companies were acquired in the following years: Sokołów in Poland, Tallegg in Estonia and Rigas Miesnieks in Latvia. Rigas Miesnieks has operations in Lithuania as well, where the company offers Klaipedos Maistas brand products in addition to its own Latvian brands.

In 2006 and 2007 the heavily expanded company, that by this time was known as HK Ruokatalo Group, acquired Scan AB, the largest meat producer in Sweden. Consequently, the company renamed to HKScan Oyj.

In September 2010 HKScan announced that it would acquire the biggest poultry products manufacturer in Denmark, Rose Poultry.

The company has optimized its production chain heavily during the 1990s and 2000s, leading to many mass layoffs and closures. Production facilities in Turku were closed in October 2007, and in Tampere in March 2008.

== Brands ==
In Finland, HKFoods offers several brands including:

- HK: all beef and pork meat and products, ready meals and salads. The most-recognized product is probably Sininen Lenkki – an inexpensive mixed-meat sausage.
- Kariniemen: Chicken products
- Via: The latest addition, gourmet products designed by the TV chef Jyrki Sukula

== See also ==
- Company website
