= Kartanonkoski =

Suburban housing development in Finland

Coordinates: 60°16′N 24°57′E

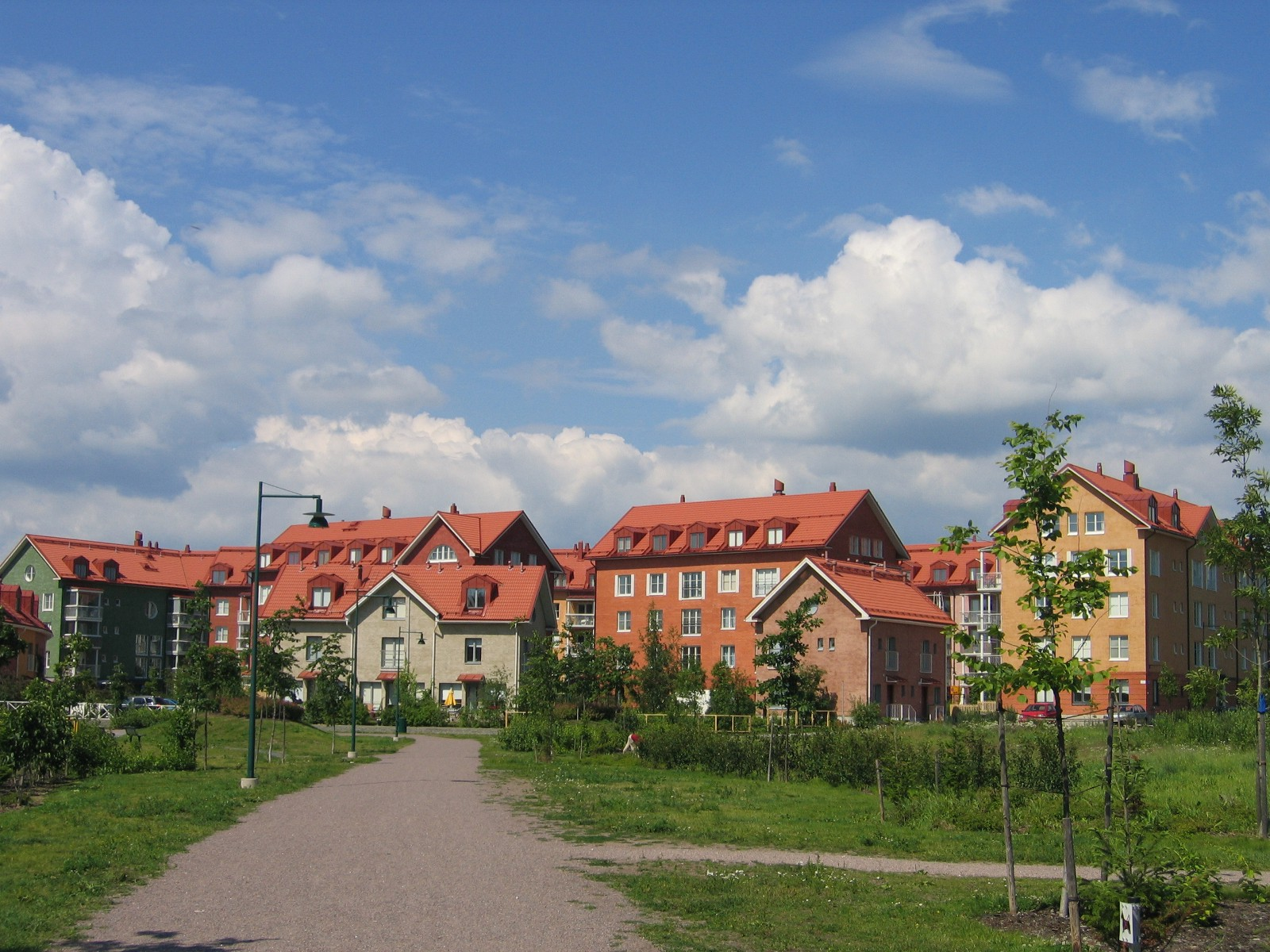
Kartanonkoski suburb

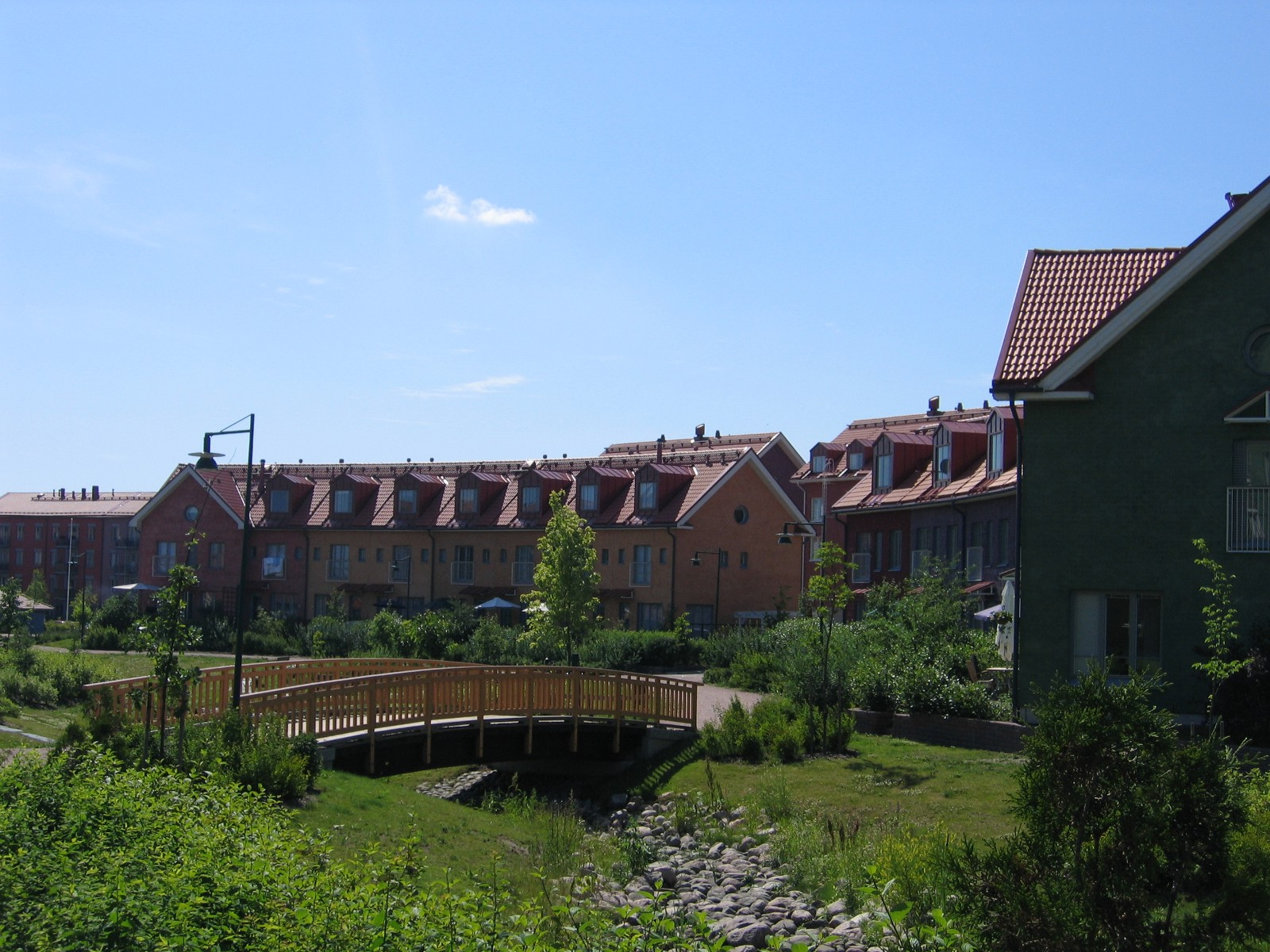
Kartanonkoski suburb

Kartanonkoski (Swedish: Herrgårdsforsen) is a Finnish housing suburb in the southern part of the City of Vantaa. Kartanonkoski is a part of the Pakkala district and furthermore a part of Aviapolis marketing brand area of Vantaa.

The area is located on the grounds of the Backas Mansion. Located in or near the area are the International School of Vantaa, Jumbo shopping mall, and Ruutinkoski Rapids. The area is 2 kilometres away from Helsinki-Vantaa Airport.

== History ==
In 1998, the City of Vantaa organized a competition for the planning of a "garden village". The winner was the Swedish architectural firm Djurgårdsstaden arkitekter. The area is part of the Pakkala district but for marketing reasons the suburb was named Kartanonkoski. The town planning concept was partly taken from the Garden city movement in Britain from the end of the 19th century, as well as the New Urbanism movement at the time of its inception. The overall town plan shuns the typical orthogonal street grid in favour of curving street delineations, crescents, shifts in axes, localised symmetry, and more organic structures. The area consists of houses and apartment blocks arranged mostly in terraces though many of the detached and semi-detached houses on the south side of the area are of generic rectangular type, but in bright colours. Numerous children's play areas are situated throughout the area. Public green areas permeate the entire area, contributing to the "garden village" ambience. The construction began in 2000.

With its red-tiled pitched roofs, gables, vernacular detailing, ornamentation and bright colours - as well as lack of flat roofs and strip windows - the architecture of Kartanonkoski represents a Neo-vernacular or Neohistorism style. It is heavily influenced by the Nordic Classicism of the 1920s - especially in places the wooden Puu-Käpylä district of Helsinki - but also the Postmodernism of the 1970s and 1980s. The houses are mostly two storeys, but in places go up to five storeys. The intention of the architects was to combine the technology and building methods of the present - most of the houses are built using prefabricated concrete construction synonymous with modernism - with the architectural tradition of the past with heavy emphasis on aesthetics.

The construction costs were initially 10% higher compared to that of modernist style buildings, but the apartments sold at prices 50% higher than ordinary flats.
