= Jumbo shopping centre =

- Kauppakeskus Jumbo
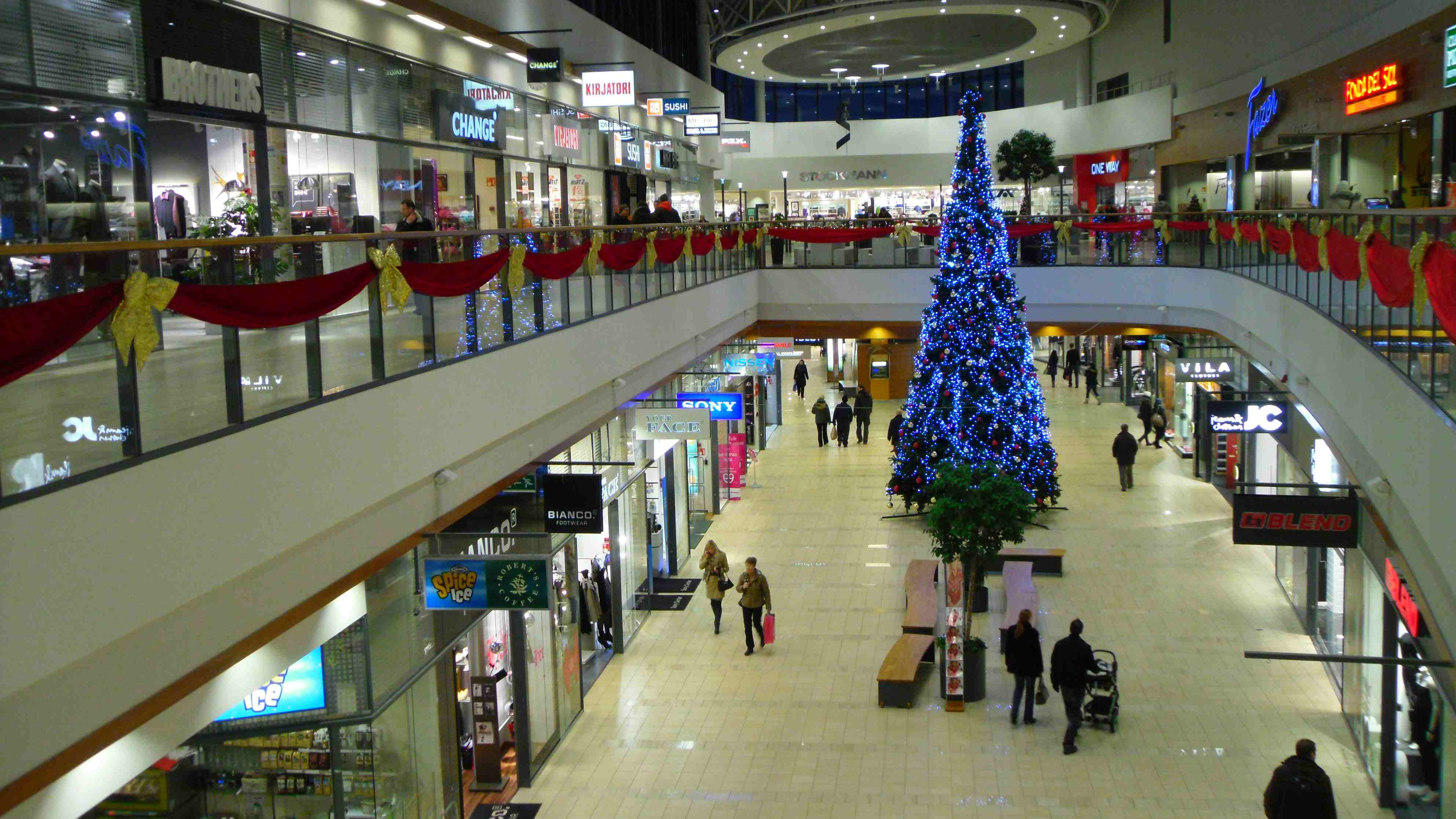
- Jumbo during the Christmas season
- Location: Vantaa, Finland
- Coordinates: 60.291053°N 24.964636°E
- Address: Vantaanportinkatu 3
- Opened: October 1999
- Owner: Unibail-Rodamco, Kesko, HOK-Elanto, Elo Mutual Pension Insurance Company
- Num. of stores: 119
- Floor area: 86,100 square metres (927,000 sq ft)
- Floors: 3
- Parking: 4600
- Website: jumbo.fi/en/ (in English)

Jumbo shopping centre (Finnish: Kauppakeskus Jumbo), commonly referred to as simply Jumbo, is a shopping center in Vantaa, Finland. It is located in the district of Pakkala, 2 kilometres south of Helsinki Airport. In 2019 it became the largest shopping and entertainment center in the Nordic countries, with its gross leasable area of 140,000 square metres (1,500,000 sq ft).

Jumbo was completed in October 1999. In 2015, the shopping mall employed approximately 1,500 people. It has two hypermarket chains: Prisma (owned by S Group) and K-Citymarket (owned by Kesko).

== History ==
Jumbo's foundation was laid before the recession of the 1990s due to the great demand that arose in the area for a shopping center. The construction companies Haka and Polar purchased the area and its surroundings from the consumers' co-operative Elanto and named the newly established development company Vantaanportti Oy. The company also purchased the neighboring residential areas and business park land. In October 1999, Jumbo was completed. In its first year, the shopping center attracted 6 million customers, with the number of customers rising since. An expansion was completed in 2005.

== Flamingo ==
In 2008, the Flamingo entertainment center was built next to Jumbo. Prior to completion, it was referred to as "Jumbo Park", as it is connected to the shopping center and the two centers act in co-operation rather than competition. Together, the two are referred to in Finnish as Viihdekauppakeskus (entertainment shopping centre).

In 2019, Jumbo merged with the Flamingo entertainment center, making it the largest shopping and entertainment center in the Nordics, with a leasable area of 140,000 square metres (1,500,000 sq ft). The combined centre began to be referred to as Jumbo-Flamingo.

In 2024, the combined name Jumbo-Flamingo was discontinued. The logo and brand were renewed, and the name was shortened to Jumbo to cover both centres. Since then, the former Flamingo complex has been referred to as Jumbo’s ”leisure quarter”.

== Gallery ==
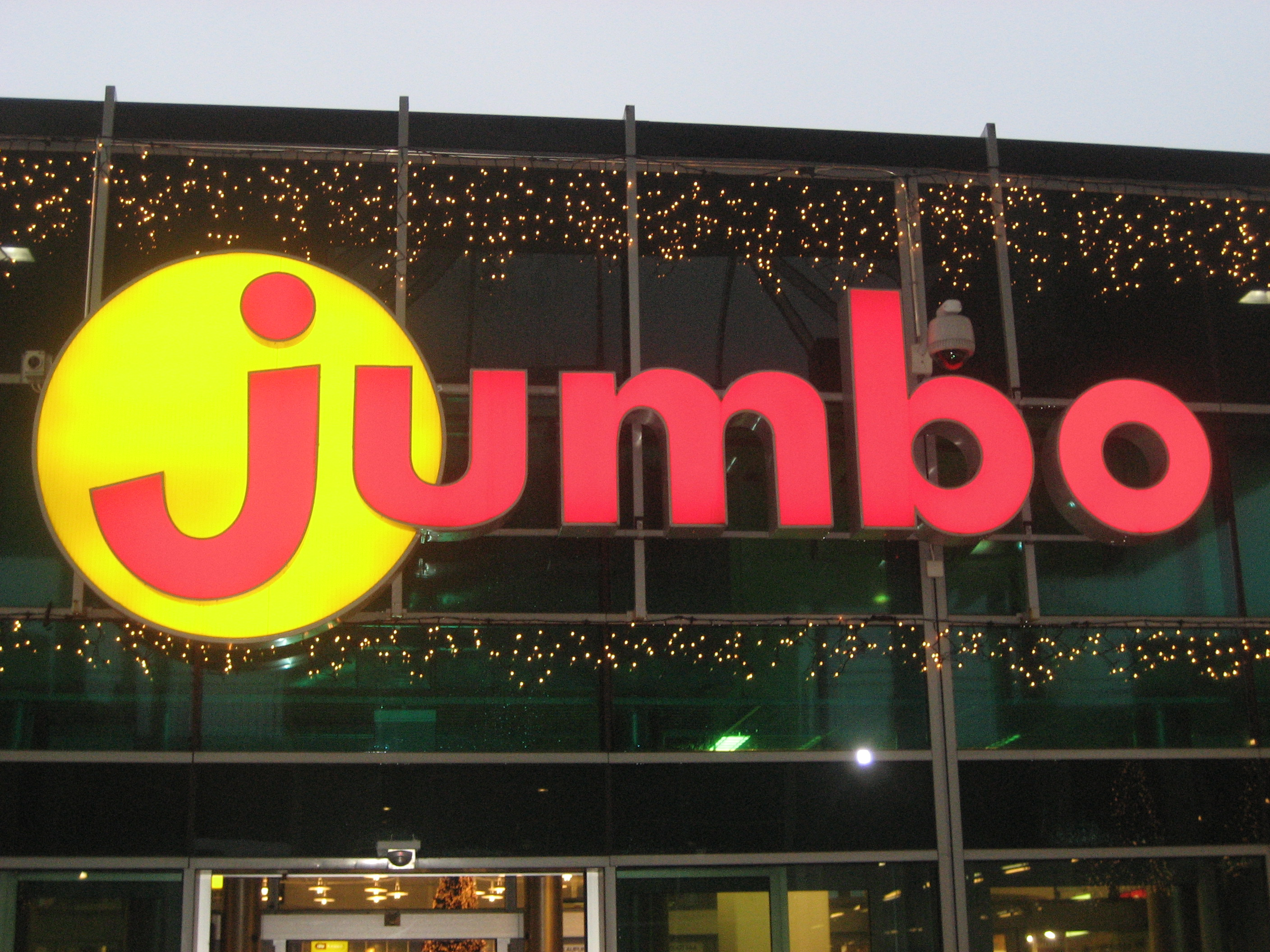

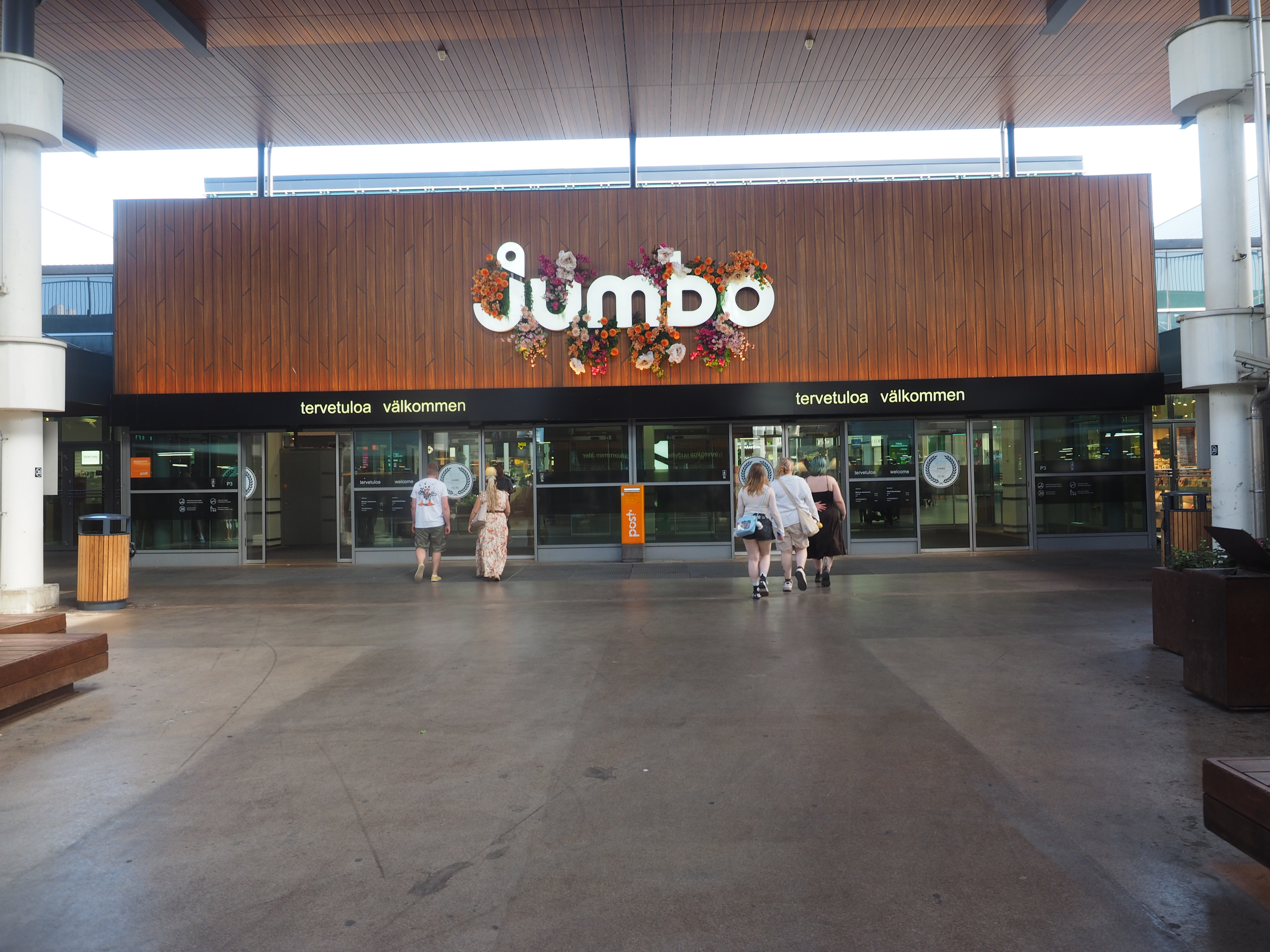

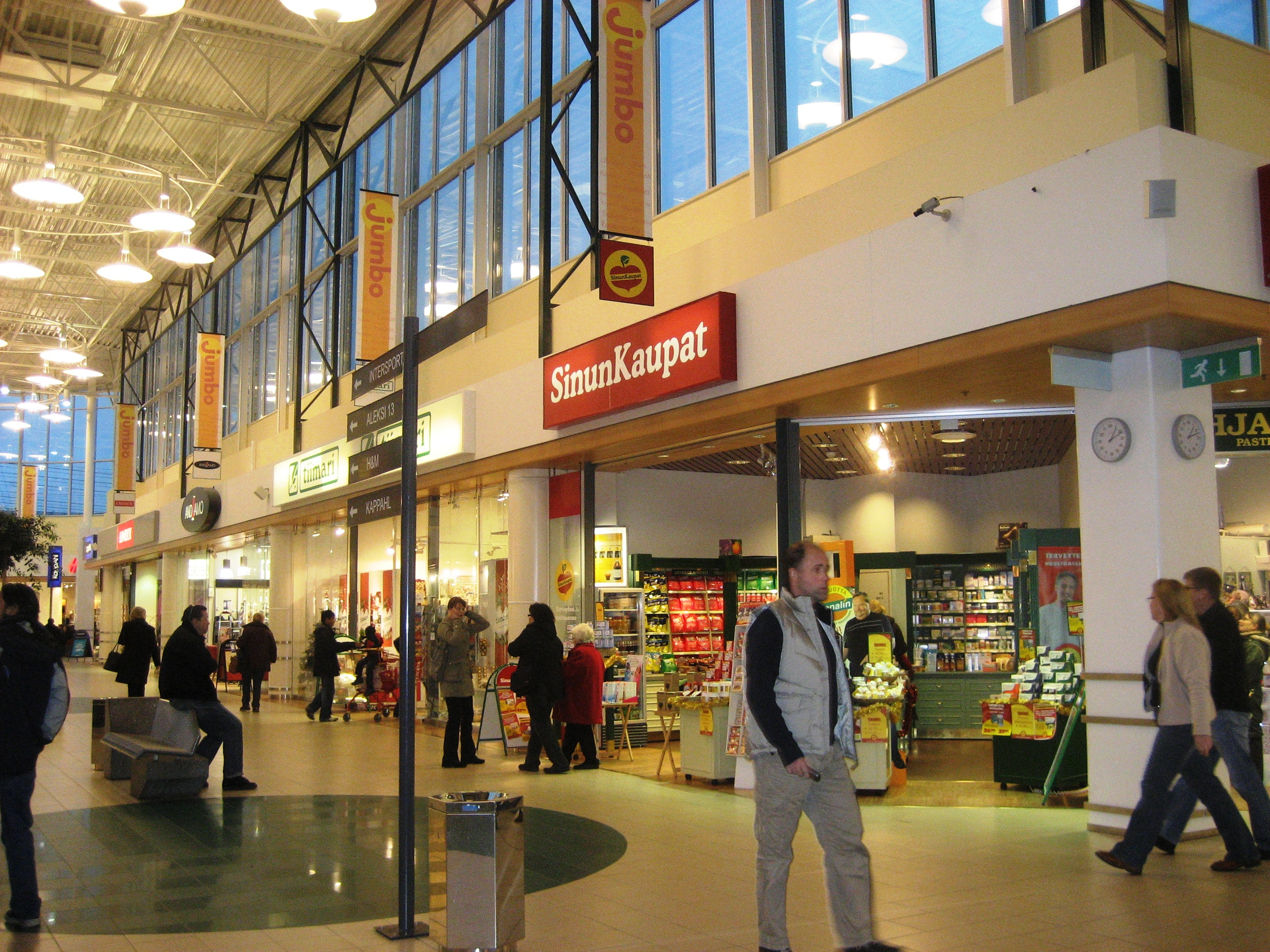

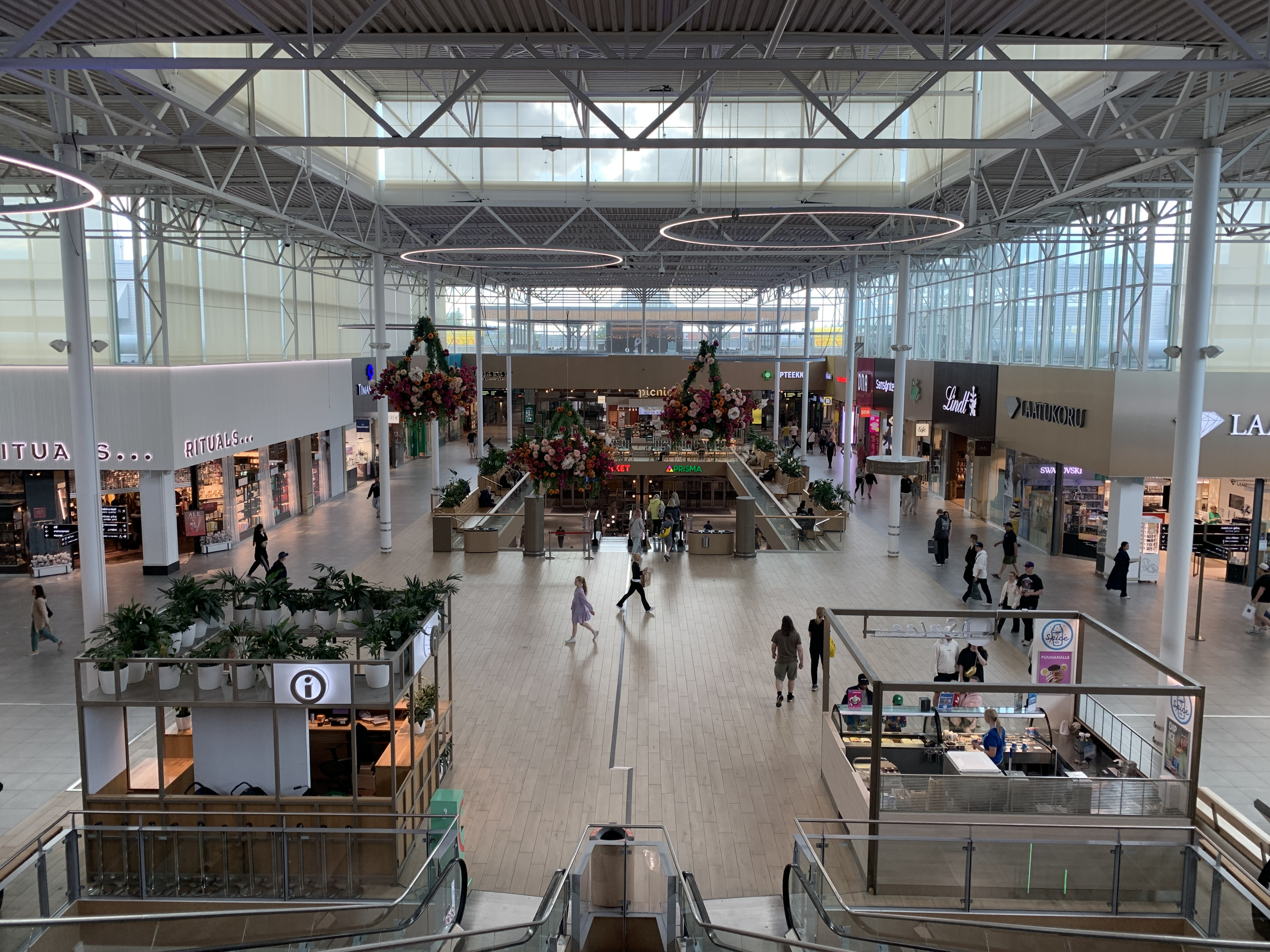

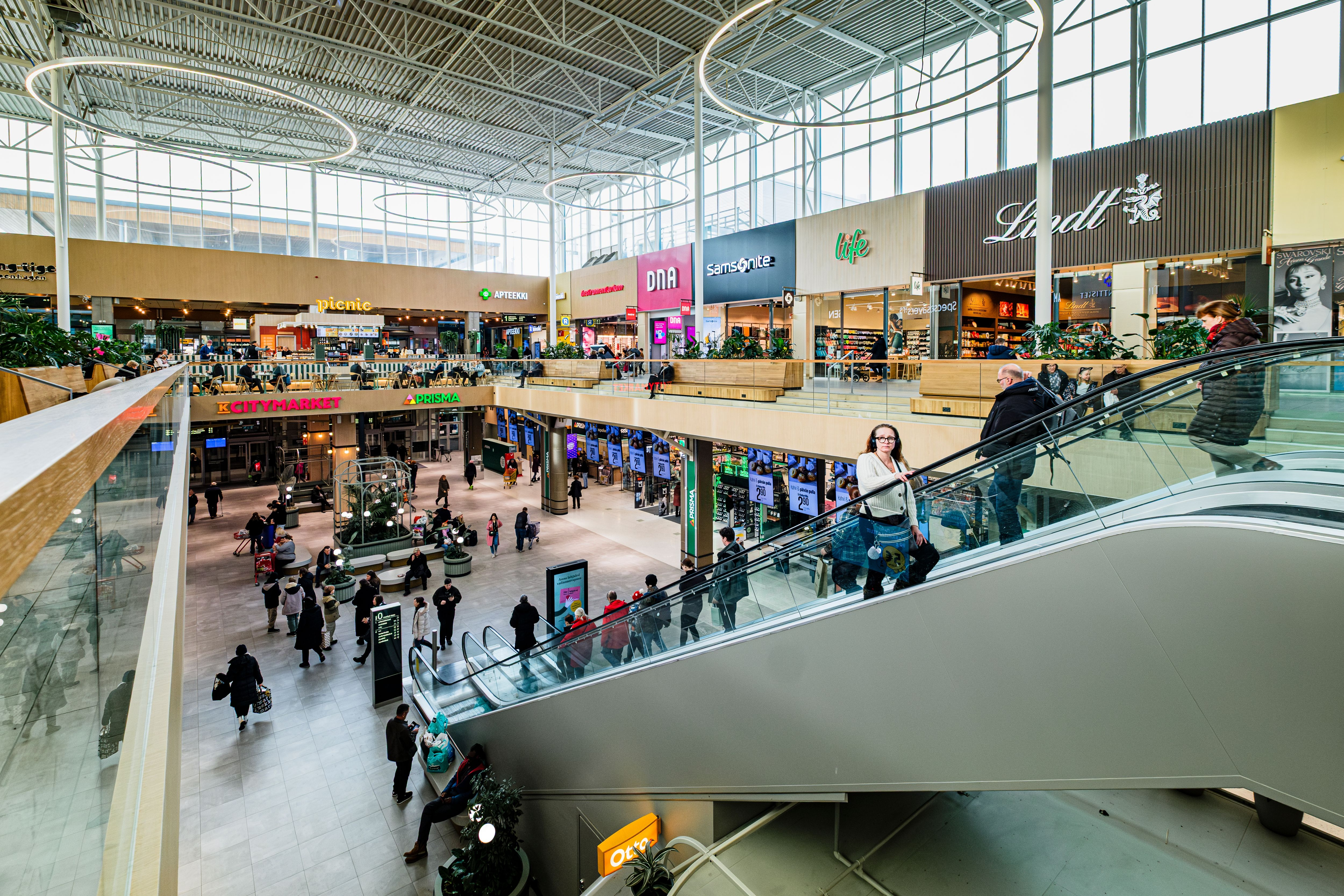
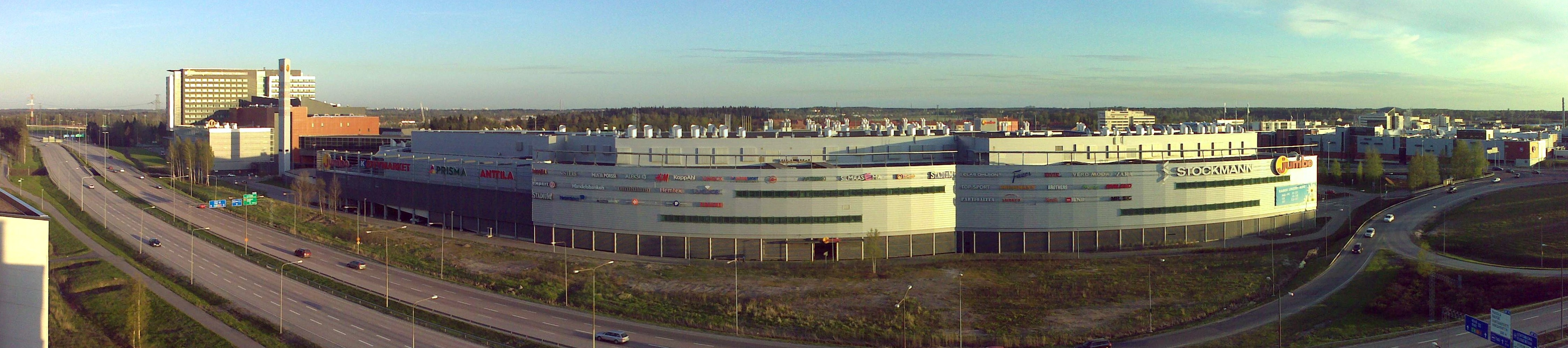
A panoramic view of Jumbo in Aviapolis, Vantaa. Ring III runs through the foreground, and Flamingo can be seen in the background to the left
