= Districts of Vantaa =

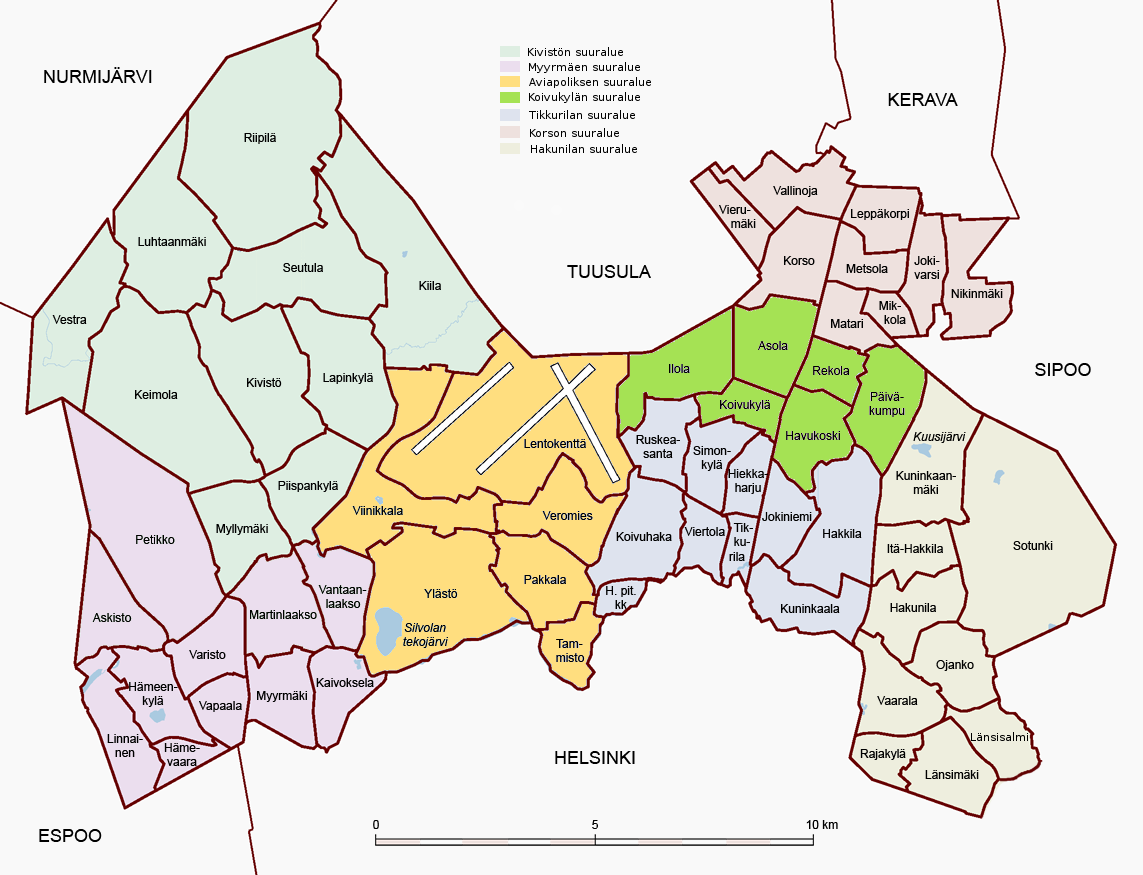
A map of Vantaa, with the districts pictured

The city of Vantaa, Finland, incorporated in 1972 is divided into 60 districts. Key attractions in the city are the Church of St. Lauri (1492), the Parish of Helsinki Museum, and the Finnish Aviation Museum. Vantaa is connected with Helsinki and Lahti by motorways and railways. Helsinki-Vantaa airport is located in Vantaa. The city is also an important manufacturing centre. These districts are grouped among seven major regions.

== List of districts ==
This is a list of the 60 districts of Vantaa, grouped among their respective major regions and ordered alphabetically.

=== Aviapolis area ===
- Lentokenttä (Swedish: Flygfältet)
- Pakkala (Swedish: Backas)
- Tammisto (Swedish: Rosendal)
- Veromies (Swedish: Skattmans)
- Viinikkala (Swedish: Vinikby)
- Ylästö (Swedish: Övitsböle)

=== Hakunila (Håkansböle) area ===
- Hakunila (Swedish: Håkansböle)
- Itä-Hakkila (Swedish: Östra-Haxböle)
- Kuninkaanmäki (Swedish: Kungsbacka)
- Länsimäki (Swedish: Västerkulla)
- Länsisalmi (Swedish: Västersundom)
- Ojanko (Swedish: Gjutan)
- Rajakylä (Swedish: Råby)
- Sotunki (Swedish: Sottungsby)
- Vaarala (Swedish: Fagersta)

=== Kivistö area ===
- Keimola (Swedish: Käinby)
- Kiila (Swedish: Kila)
- Kivistö
- Lapinkylä (Swedish: Lappböle)
- Luhtaanmäki (Swedish: Luhtabacka)
- Myllymäki (Swedish: Kvarnbacka)
- Piispankylä (Swedish: Biskopsböle)
- Riipilä (Swedish: Ripuby)
- Seutula (Swedish: Sjöskog)
- Vestra (Swedish: Västra)

=== Koivukylä (Björkby) area ===
- Asola
- Havukoski
- Ilola (Swedish: Gladas)
- Koivukylä (Swedish: Björkby)
- Päiväkumpu (Swedish: Lövkulla)
- Rekola (Vantaa) (Swedish: Räckhals)

=== Korso area ===
- Jokivarsi
- Korso
- Leppäkorpi (Swedish: Alkärr)
- Matari (Swedish: Matar)
- Metsola (Swedish: Skogsbrinken)
- Mikkola
- Nikinmäki (Swedish: Nissbacka)
- Vallinoja (Swedish: Fallbäcken)
- Vierumäki

=== Myyrmäki (Myrbacka) area ===
- Askisto (Swedish: Askis)
- Hämeenkylä (Swedish: Tavastby)
- Hämevaara (Swedish: Tavasteberga)
- Kaivoksela (Swedish: Gruvsta)
- Linnainen (Swedish: Linnais)
- Martinlaakso (Swedish: Mårtensdal)
- Myyrmäki (Swedish: Myrbacka)
- Petikko
- Vantaanlaakso (Swedish: Vandadalen)
- Vapaala (Swedish: Friherrs)
- Varisto (Swedish: Varistorna)

=== Tikkurila (Dickursby) area ===
- Hakkila (Swedish: Haxböle)
- Helsingin pitäjän kirkonkylä (Swedish: Helsinge kyrkoby)
- Hiekkaharju (Swedish: Sandkulla)
- Jokiniemi (Swedish: Ånas)
- Koivuhaka (Swedish: Björkhagen)
- Kuninkaala (Swedish: Fastböle)
- Ruskeasanta (Swedish: Rödsand)
- Simonkylä (Swedish: Simonsböle)
- Tikkurila (Swedish: Dickursby)
- Viertola (Swedish: Bäckby)
