= Lentokenttä =

Lentokenttä Flygfältet
- City District
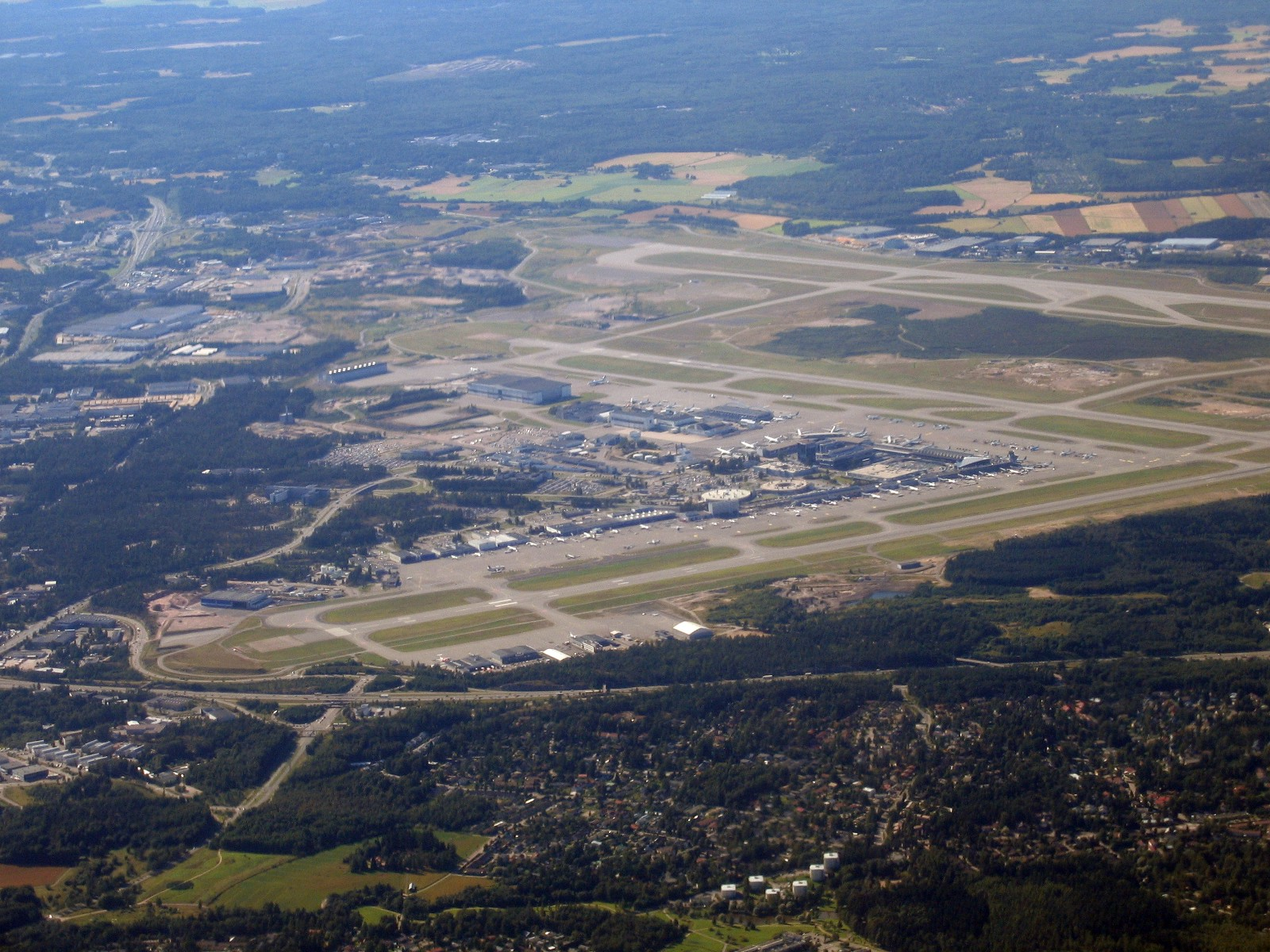
- Aerial view of Lentokenttä with the Helsinki Airport pictured

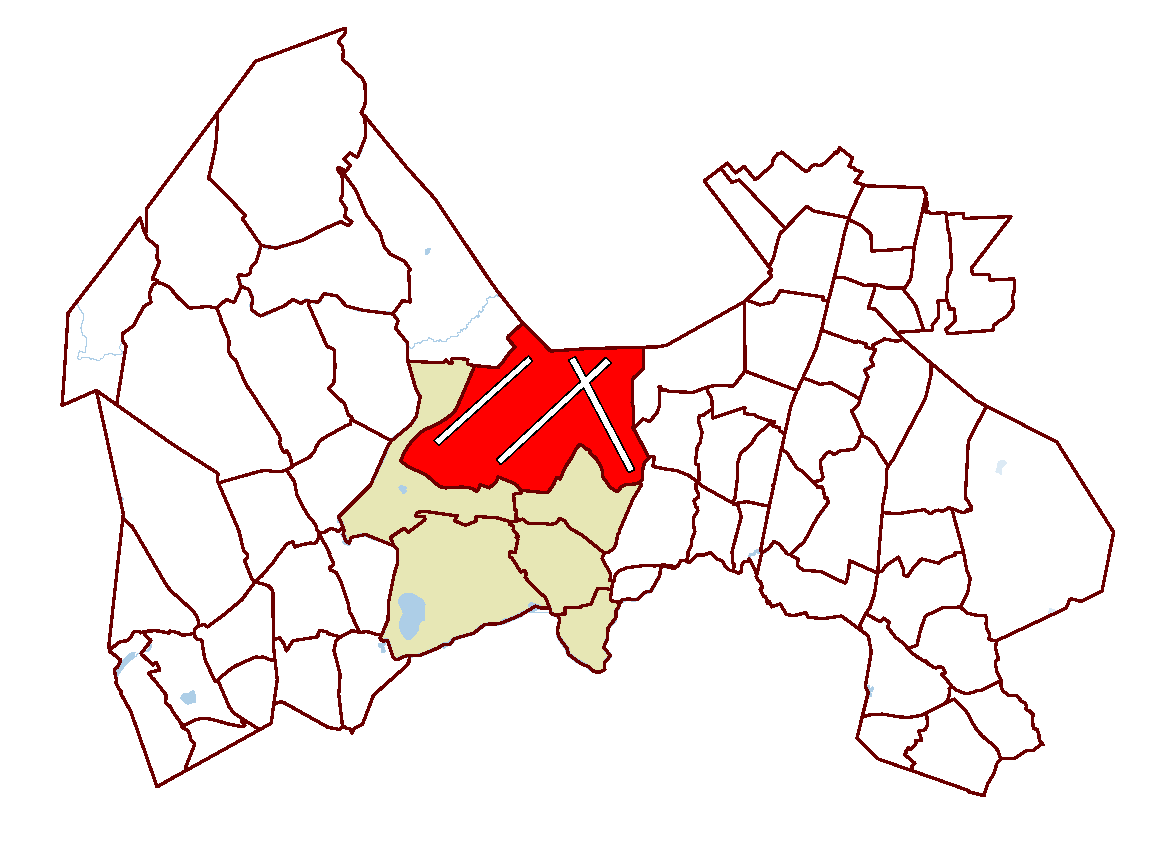
- Location on the map of Vantaa, with the district in red and the Aviapolis major region in light brown.
- Coordinates: 60°19′02″N 24°57′48″E
- Country: Finland
- City: Vantaa
- Major region: Aviapolis

Population (2025-12-31)
  - Total: 8
- Time zone: UTC+02:00
- Postal Code(s): 01530
- Website: www.vantaa.fi/frontpage

Lentokenttä (Swedish: Flygfältet; lit. 'airfield') is a district of Vantaa, Finland, located in the middle of the city. The district is part of the Aviapolis major region and has been named after the Helsinki Airport situated there.

The district of Lentokenttä is the largest single job concentration of Vantaa. In 2001, the district provided jobs for over 11,000 people, of which almost 9,000 worked in customer service. As the airport area has grown, the number of jobs has increased dramatically.

Nowadays, only eight people live permanently in the district of Lentokenttä, giving it a population density of 0.58 inhabitants per square kilometre (1.5/sq mi). In 1980, there were still over 200 people living in the district.

With regard to services, Lentokenttä is fairly self-sufficient, with cafés, restaurants, shops, banks, and a bus terminal. The district is secured by its own fire station, deep water supply, water tower, and electrical plant. Near the airport, accommodation is available in hotels, and conference rooms are also available. Because of the nature of activity in an international airport, some services are only available to passengers having gone through security control.

There are offices of many air traffic carriers, cargo stations, and aircraft hangars in the district.

Close to the airport, but outside the district is the Finnish Aviation Museum.

The quietest spots near the district include the marshy Kylmäoja tributary of the Keravanjoki river located east of the airport.
