= Simosenkylä =

Illegal village in Vantaa, Finland

Coordinates: 60°19′36.01″N 24°59′31.01″E

Simosenkylä (lit. 'Village of Simonen') is an illegal village in Vantaa, Finland. It is located in the forest area between Helsinki Airport and Tuusula Highway, along the Simosentie road. The village consists of one-story houses, which are badly dilapidated, some even abandoned. The city of Vantaa has not recognized the area as an official district, but it is part of the Ilola neighborhood.

== History ==
There is no exact information about the birth of the village, but it is assumed that it was born around the 1950s at the latest. It was born on a road that was named after a local landowner named Simonen, who had given permission to build housing on his land for those people who moved to the capital region and couldn't find their own apartment. Little by little, houses began to grow in the area, one after another, for which practically anything could be used as a building material. In addition to the buildings resembling houses, there was also a snack bar and a train carriage on the side of the road, both of which were inhabited.

Simosenkylä was born without the city's consent and it was difficult for the city of Vantaa to accept a village that was not registered in official documents, and already in the 50s the city of Vantaa had ordered 10 buildings to be demolished. The lack of permission caused scandalous topics in the press, but in the end the city humbled itself and pulled the power lines to the houses in the area. At some point, even bookmobile and retail vehicle also toured the area.

At its peak, up to 300 people have lived in the area and it contained 50 different dwellings. Today, most of the buildings have disappeared and less than ten houses remain, most of which are abandoned. The condition of the abandoned houses approaches the point of collapse, but they have clearly been in residential use around the 2000s.

Ever since then, Simosenkylä has had a bad reputation, which was emphasized in July 2014, when the drug-addicted Stephania Aitolehti, a younger sister of model and television personality Martina Aitolehti, was killed in the area. There is also a rumor of a murder that took place is Simosenkylä in the winter of 1976 and where the body hidden in the area has never found.

== See also ==
- Abandoned village
