= Flamingo, Vantaa =

Flamingo
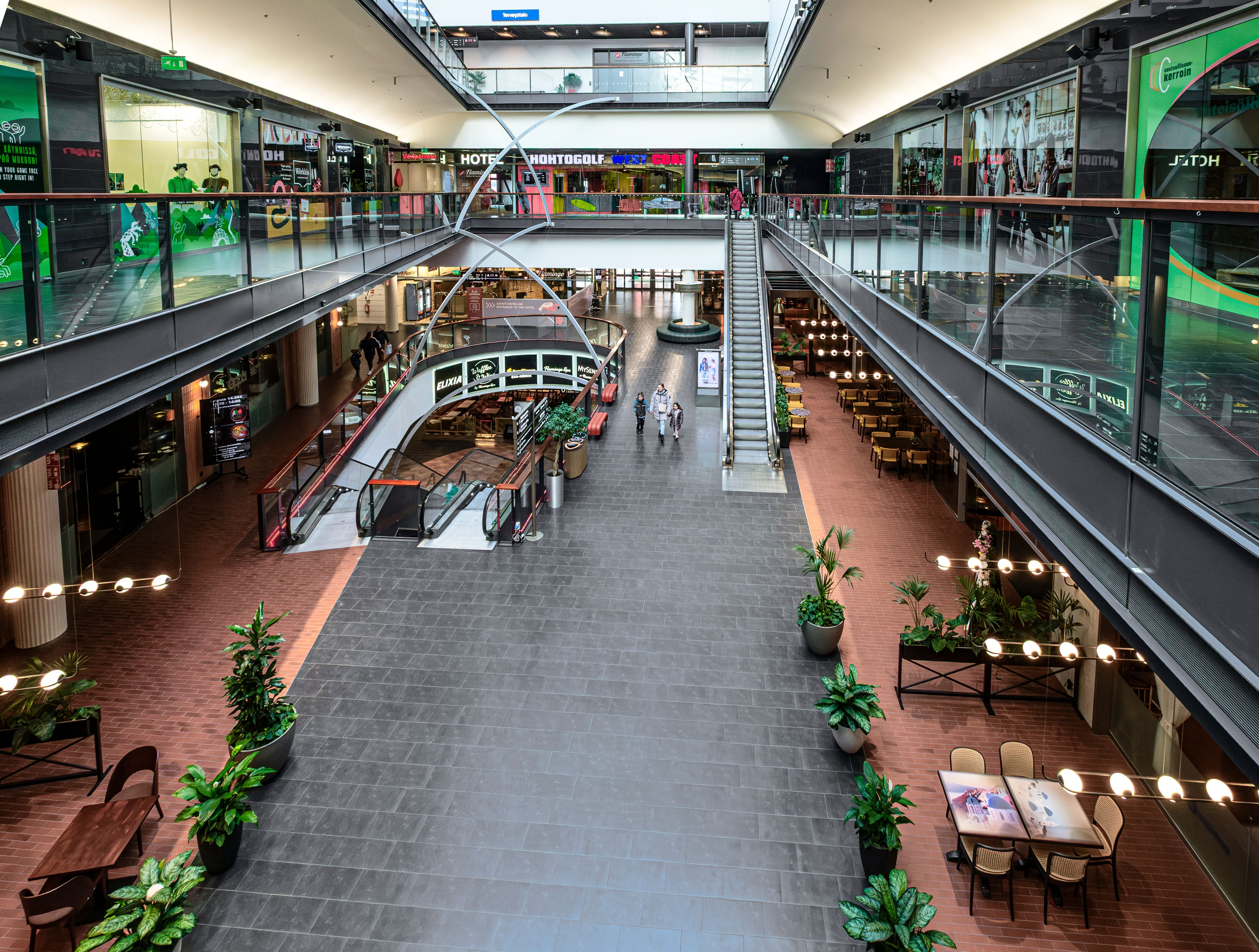
- Location: Vantaa, Finland
- Coordinates: 60°17′26″N 24°58′8″E
- Address: Tasetie 8
- Opened: September 2008
- Num. of stores: 50
- Floor area: 45,405 square metres (488,740 sq ft)
- Parking: 800

The Flamingo entertainment complex is a building that forms part of the Jumbo shopping centre in Vantaa, Finland. The building contains the Break Sokos Hotel Flamingo with more than 500 rooms, the Flamingo Spa, a Finnkino cinema, a bowling alley, a minigolf, laser games, as well as several restaurants and other shops. Flamingo also has the biggest indoor water park in Finland.

From its opening in 2008 until its 2019 merger with Jumbo, Flamingo operated as a separate shopping centre, although connected to Jumbo by a covered walkway. The two centers acted in co-operation rather than competition. The mall was renamed Jumbo-Flamingo as part of the 2019 merger, and together the two were referred to in Finnish as Viihdekauppakeskus (entertainment shopping centre), titled the biggest shopping and entertainment centre in the Nordic countries.

In 2024, the Jumbo-Flamingo logo and brand were renewed, and the name was shortened to Jumbo to cover both centres. The former Flamingo entertainment complex has since been referred to as Jumbo's "leisure quarter".

== Location and transportation ==
Flamingo (Jumbo shopping centre) is located on the side of Ring III, near to the Tuusula Highway. The nearest railway station is Aviapolis. Helsinki Airport is located 2 kilometres to the north.

There are 800 parking spots in Flamingo. The parking lot is guarded by Q-Park. Entrance to the parking lot is from the Tasetie, next to the main entrance of Flamingo.

=== Gallery ===
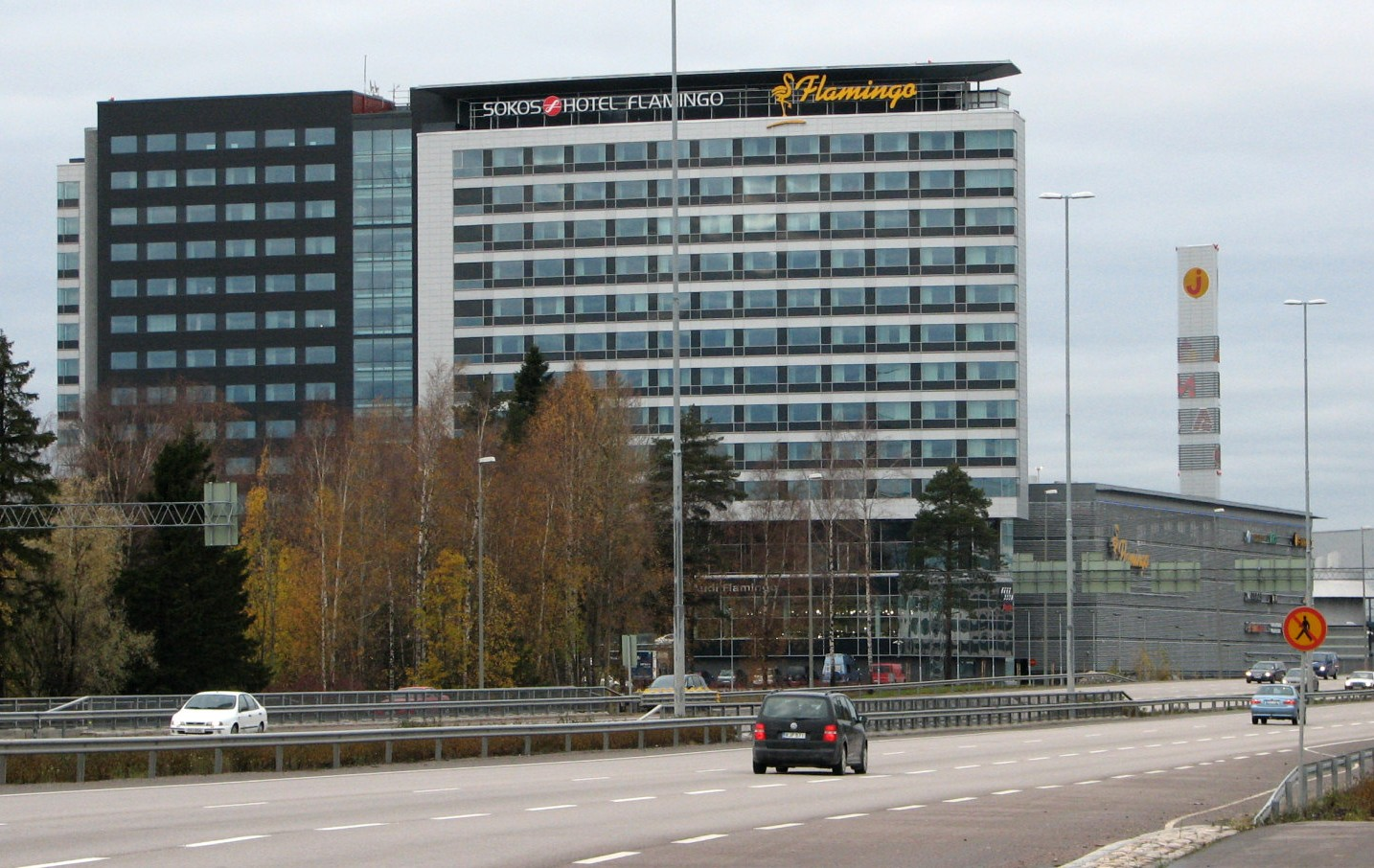
Flamingo as seen from Ring III highway

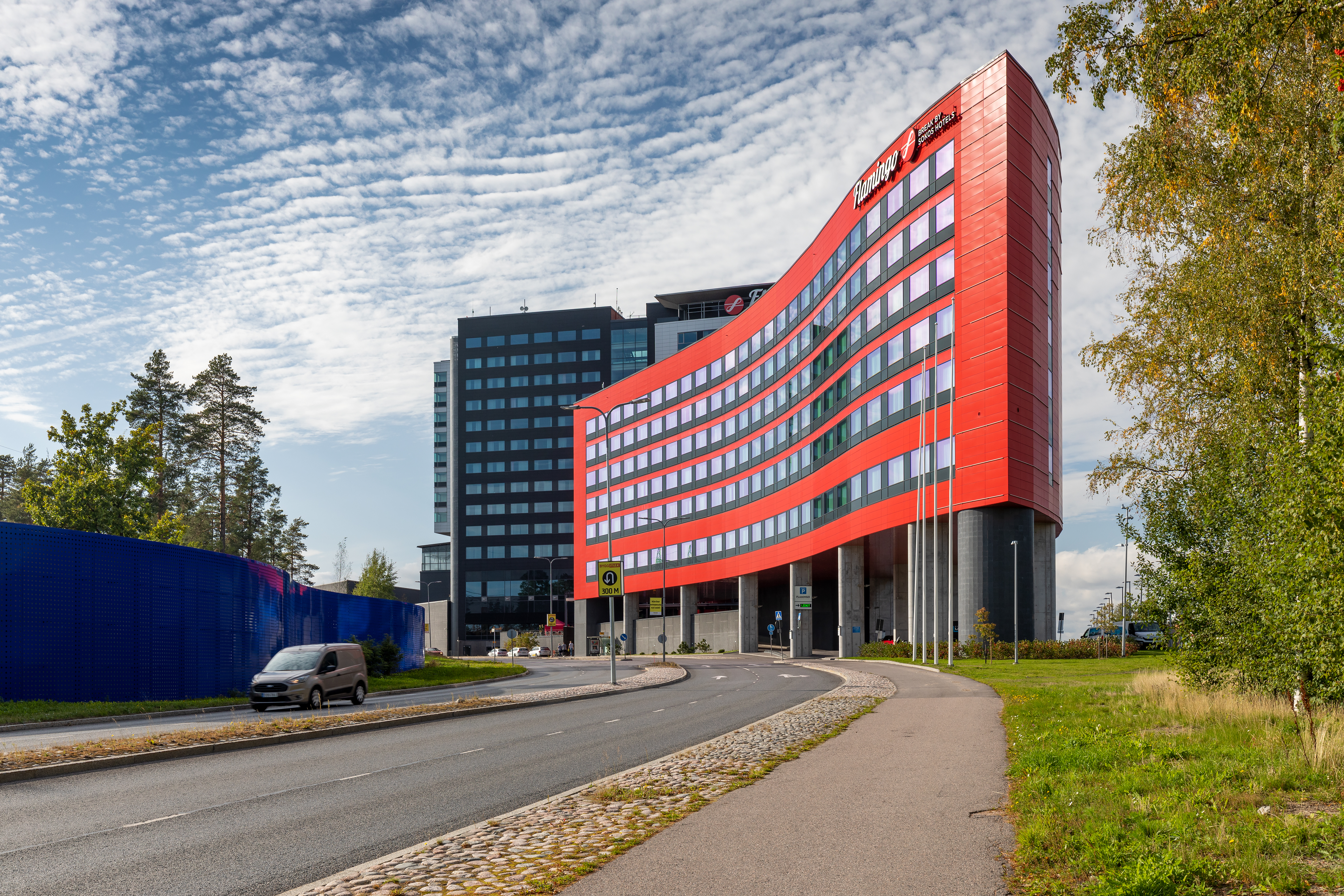
Flamingo Hotel expansion, completed in 2019

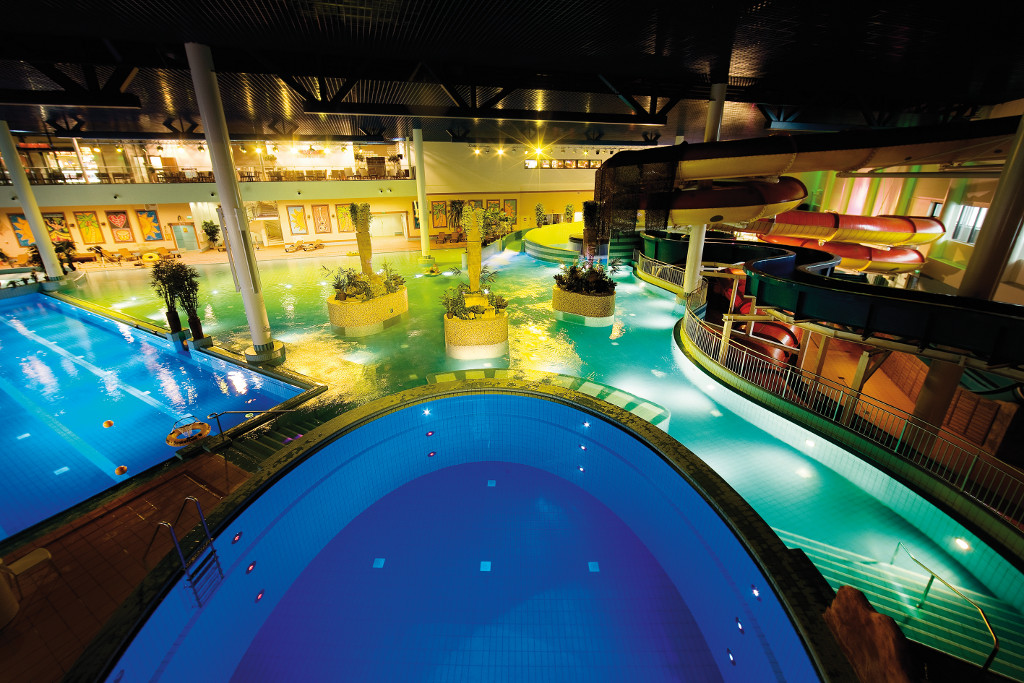
Flamingo water park
