= Pekka Halonen =

Finnish painter (1865–1933)

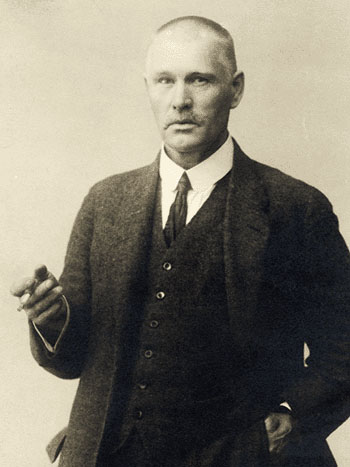
- Halonen in 1899
- Born: 23 September 1865; Lapinlahti, Grand Duchy of Finland, Russian Empire (now Finland)
- Died: 1 December 1933 (aged 68); Tuusula, Finland
- Known for: Painting

Pekka Halonen (23 September 1865 – 1 December 1933) was a Finnish painter of landscapes and people in the national romantic and Realist styles.

== Biography ==
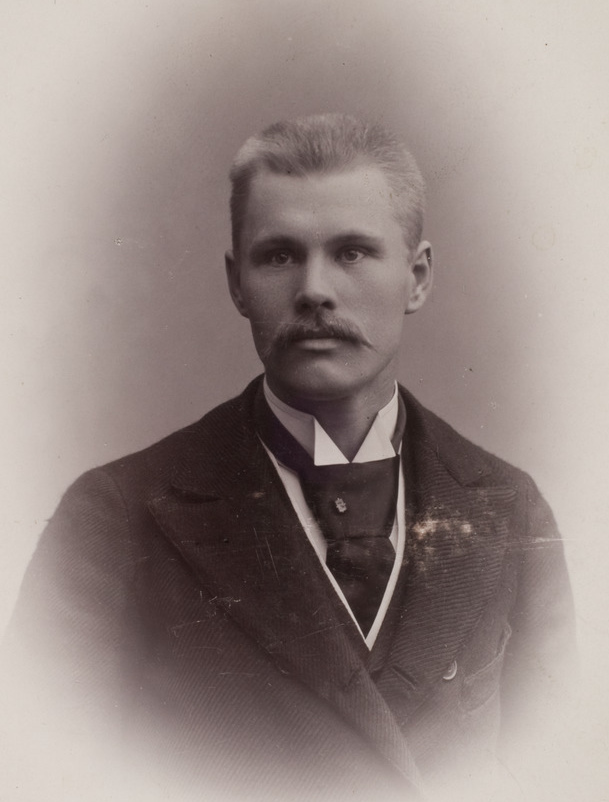
Halonen in 1890–1891

Pekka Halonen was born on 23 September 1865 in Linnasalmi, Lapinlahti, Finland, the son of Olli Halonen, a farmer, and Wilhelmina Halonen (née Uotinen). Halonen's father was himself an amateur artist who not only ran the farm, but also worked as a decorative painter on commissions from churches in neighbouring districts. Halonen often accompanied his father on these painting trips and was thus introduced into the craft of painting.

He studied in Helsinki at the Art Society's Drawing School for four years. He graduated with good grades and won a scholarship to study abroad. He went in 1890 to Paris, where he first studied at the Academie Julian and later under Paul Gauguin. He also studied at the Académie Vitti in Paris.

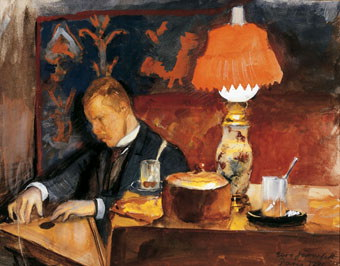
Portrait of Halonen, homesick in Paris and playing the kantele, by Eero Järnefelt, 1891

In 1896, he travelled to Florence, Siena, Rome and Naples to study early Renaissance art. In 1900, Halonen created two works for the Finnish Pavilion at the Exposition Universelle in Paris. In 1904, he traveled to Vienna to Florence by way of St. Petersburg.

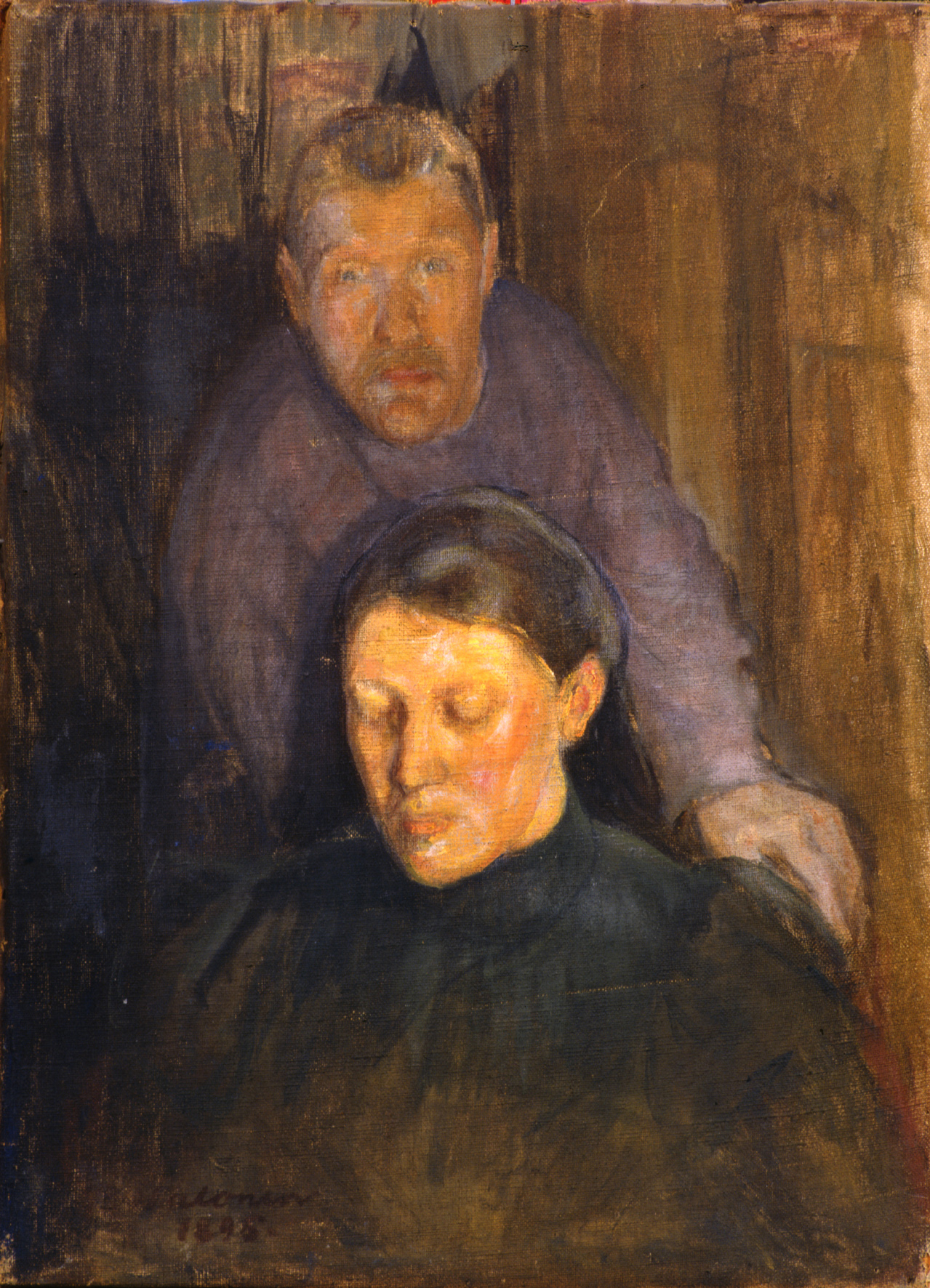
Double Portrait, Halonen and his wife Maija, 1895

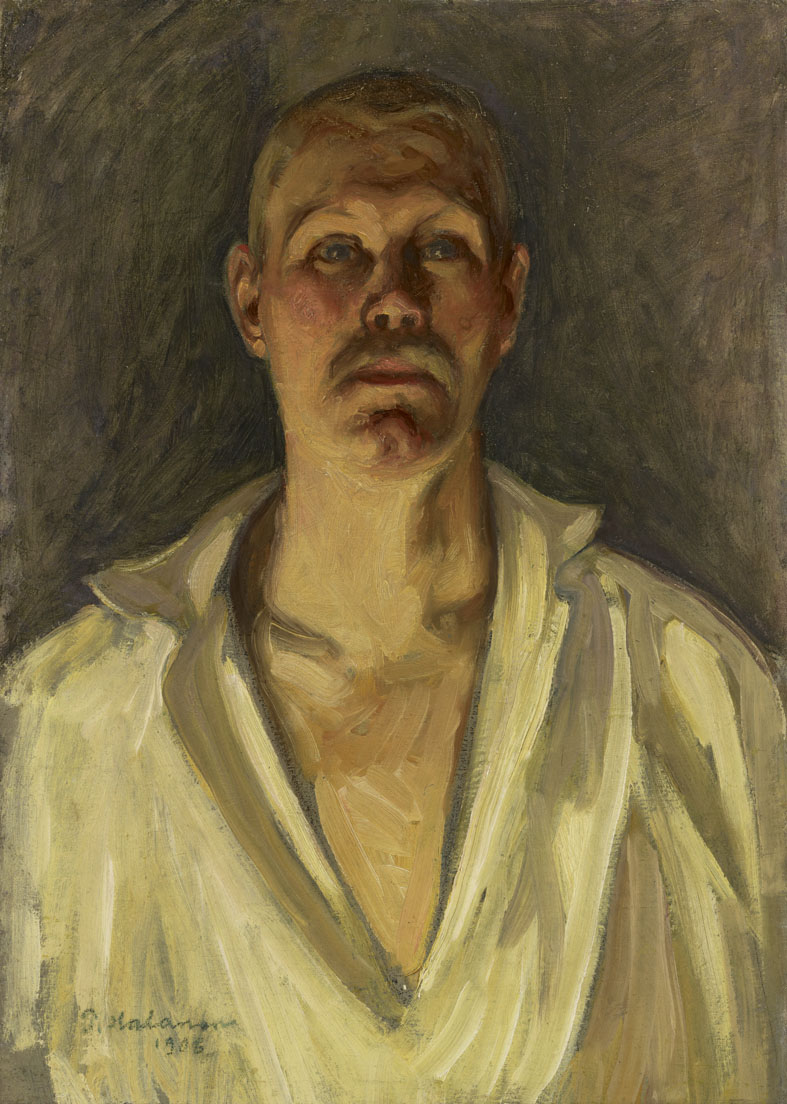
Self-Portrait, 1906 (fi)

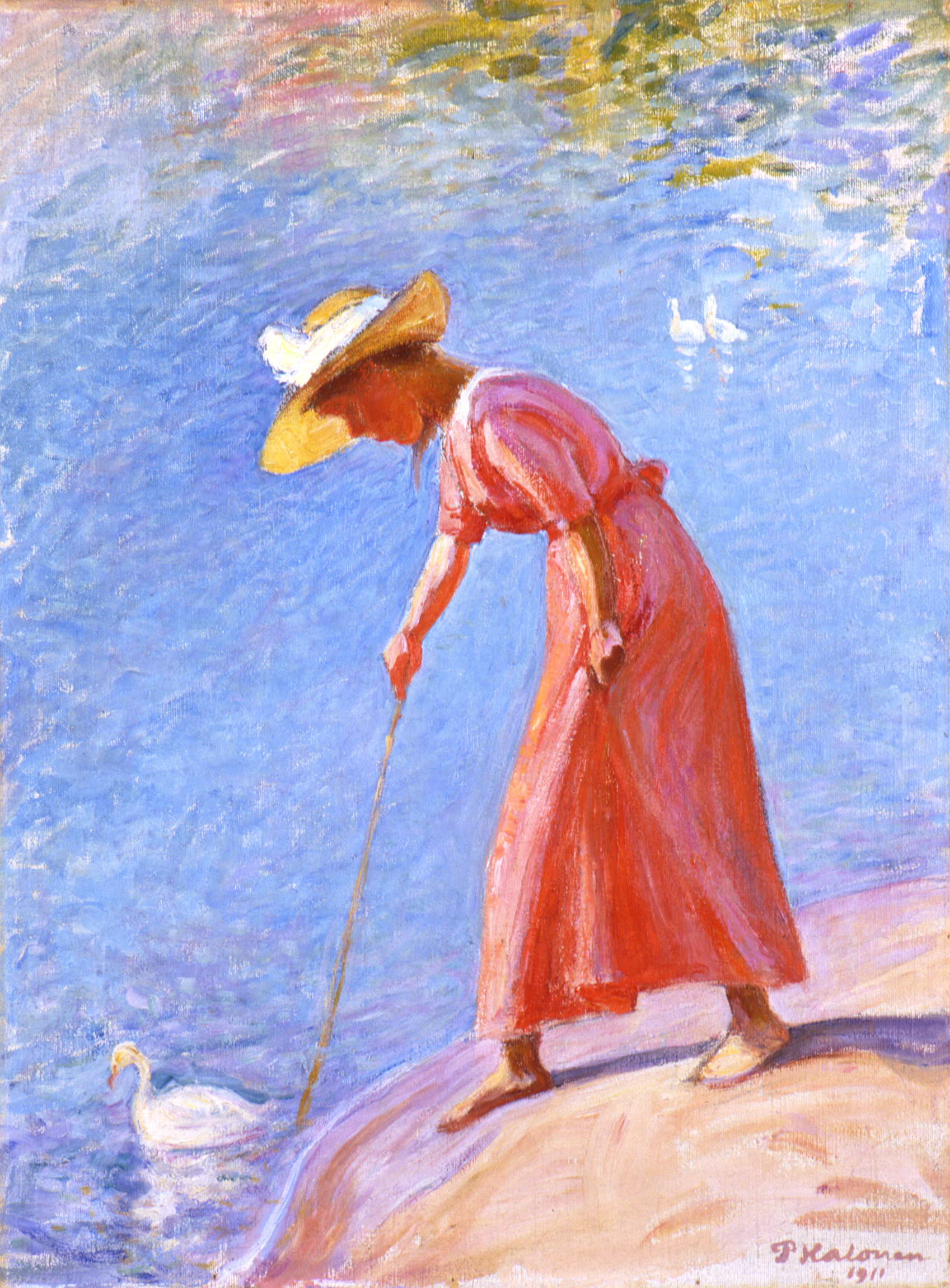
Woman in a Red Dress, 1911, depicting his daughter Anni

In 1895, Pekka Halonen married a young music student, Maija Mäkinen. They had eight children: four sons and four daughters. Halonen died in Tuusula on 1 December 1933. He was buried at the Tuusula Church in Tuusula.

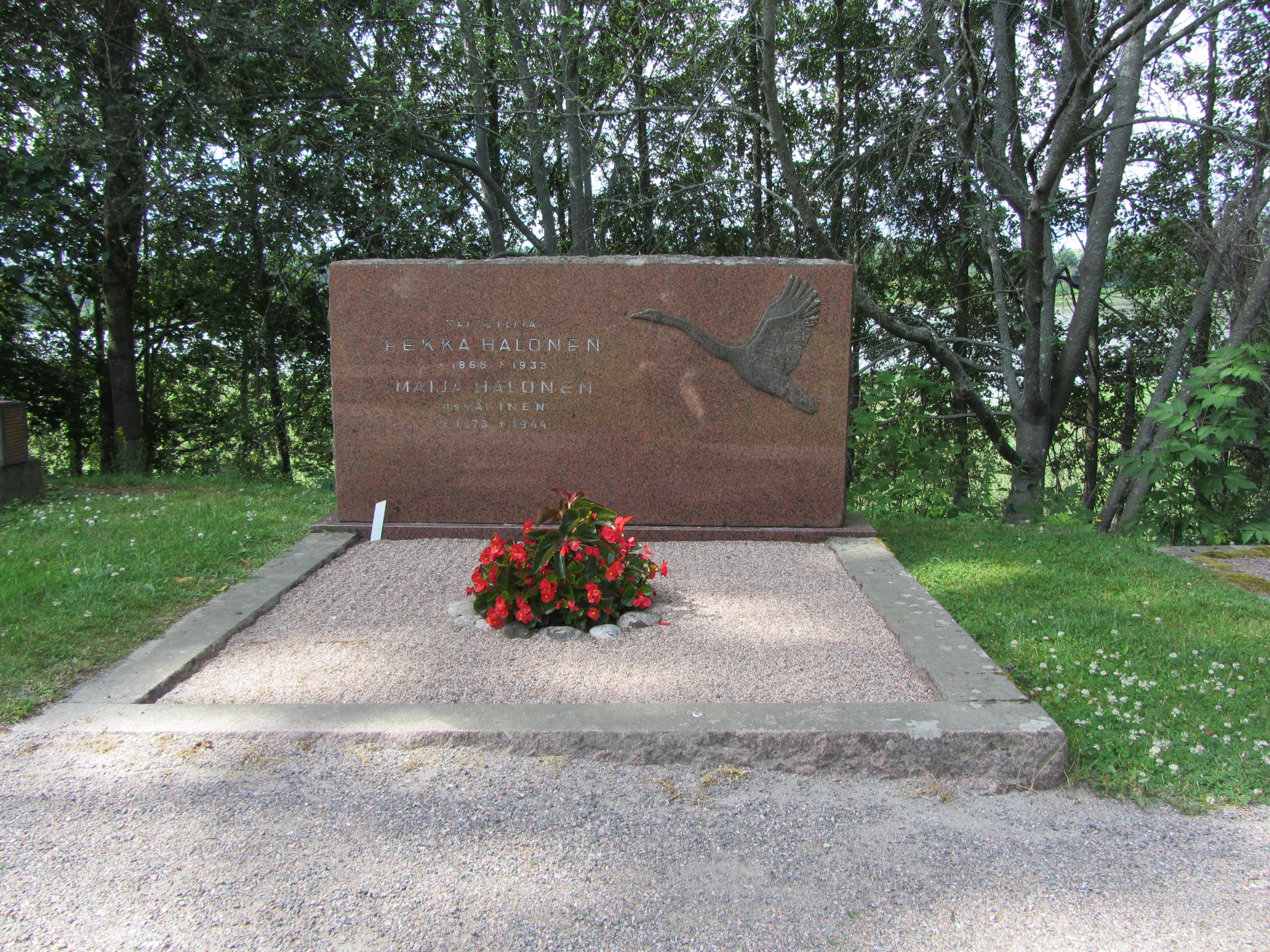
Grave of Halonen and his wife by the Tuusula Church

== Style ==
Halonen chronicled the Finnish landscape and its people. He had an early interest in Symbolism, but Gauguin's decorative Synthetism, as well as Japanese woodcuts, had a deeper impression on his work.

Many of his paintings depict simple scenes from his everyday surroundings, such as Sauna in the Snow (1908), which vividly captures the stillness and subtle fragrance of freshly fallen snow. When at the beginning of the 20th century Finland's existence was threatened, Halonen strove to foster a sense of national pride through symbolic interpretations of the Finnish landscape.

Halonen stated that he never painted for anyone but himself. He felt that "Art should not jar the nerves like sandpaper – it should produce a feeling of peace."

== Halosenniemi ==
In 1895, Halonen and his family settled down in a house with a studio on Lake Tuusula in Tuusula, Finland. Here the Halonen family lived in an imposing pinewood villa known as ‘Halosenniemi’. Halosenniemi was designed by Pekka Halonen himself and his brother Antti Halonen and was completed during the winter of 1901–02. Adjacent to the house, Halonen built a sauna, which in typical Finnish tradition also served as a laundry. The landscape near Halosenniemi was an important source of inspiration for his art. In Tuusula Halonen had a wide circle of artist friends and relatives which provided him with a daily source of social and cultural stimulation.

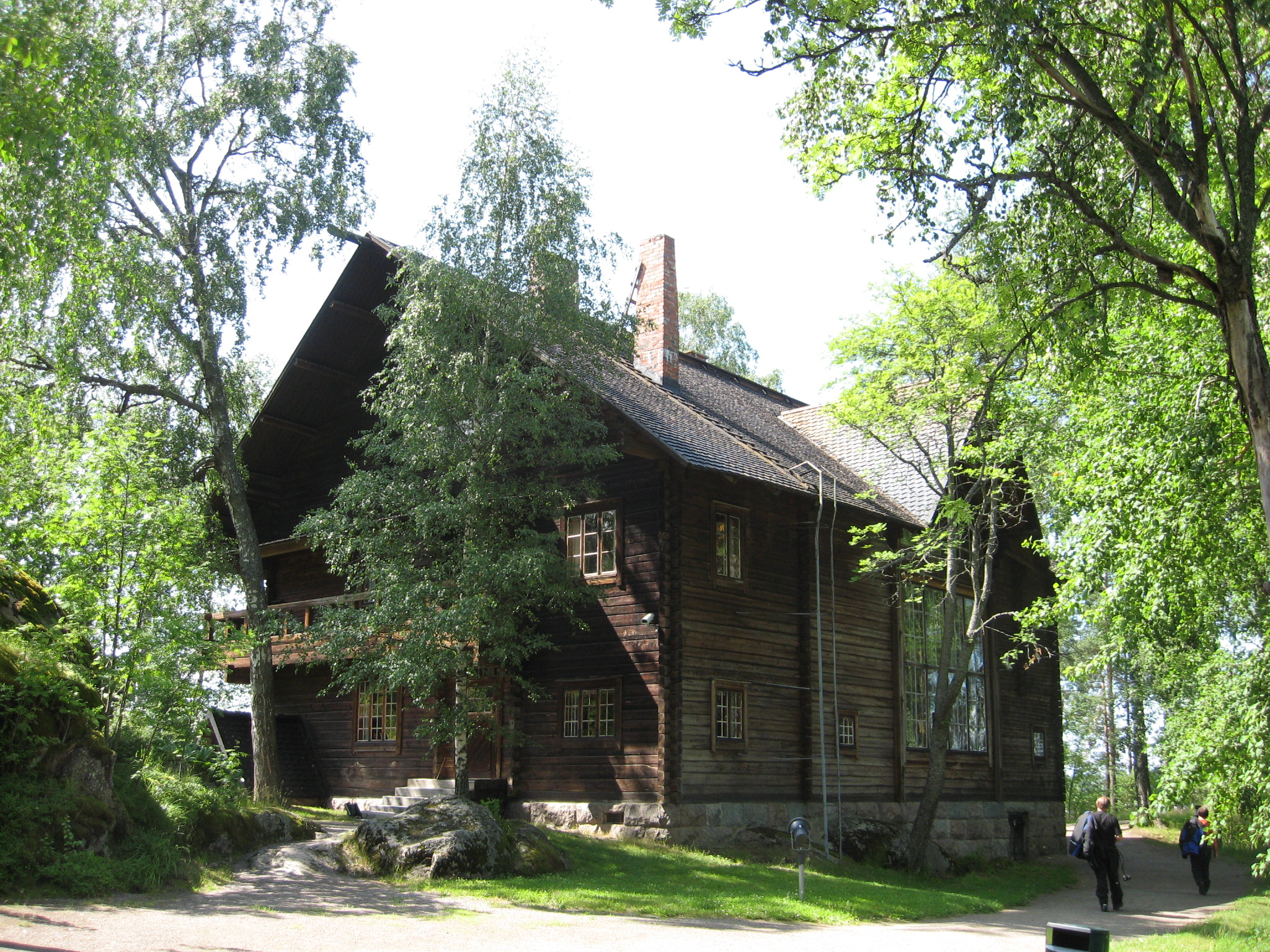
Halosenniemi

On the shores of the lake where he resided an artists' community flourished, helping to develop a sense of Finnish national identity. Halosenniemi was designed with the two-storey studios of Paris in mind, with high ceilings and tall windows in the studio, and second-floor living-quarters accessible by a set of stairs and a balcony that overlooked the studio.

The building is now a museum that includes original furnishings and Halonen's own art.

== Selected works ==
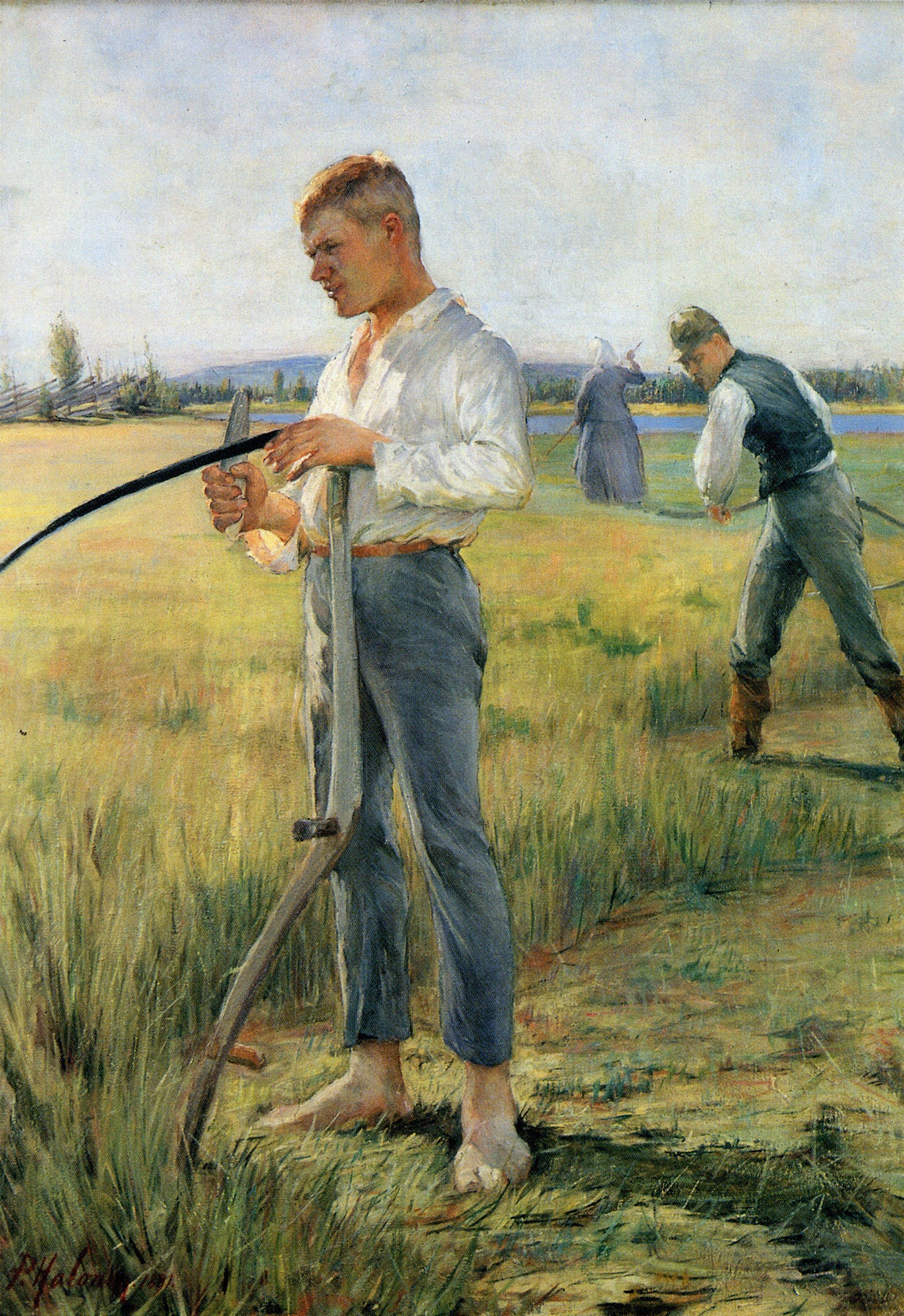
The Mower Men, 1891 (fi)

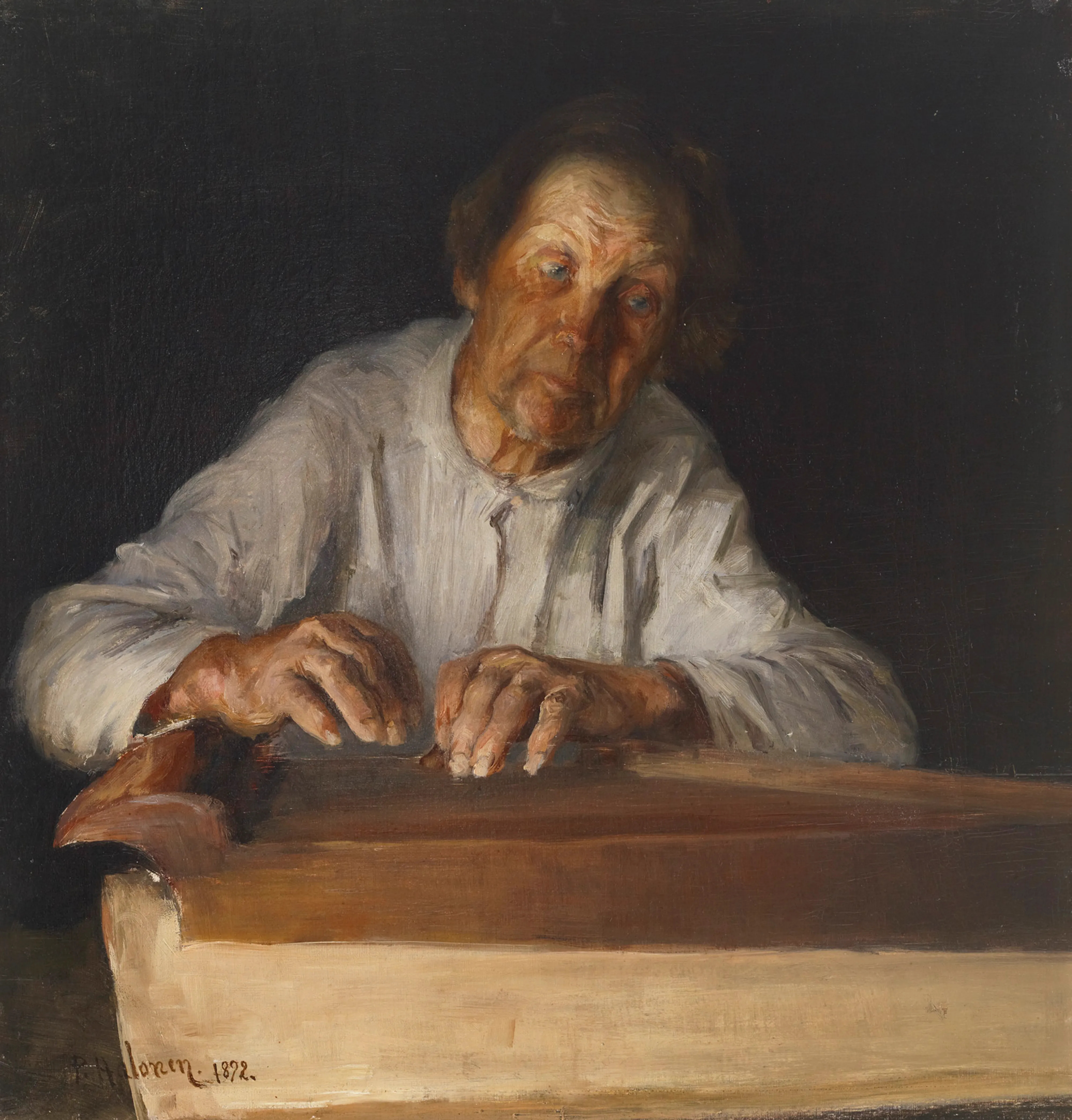
The Kantele Player, 1892

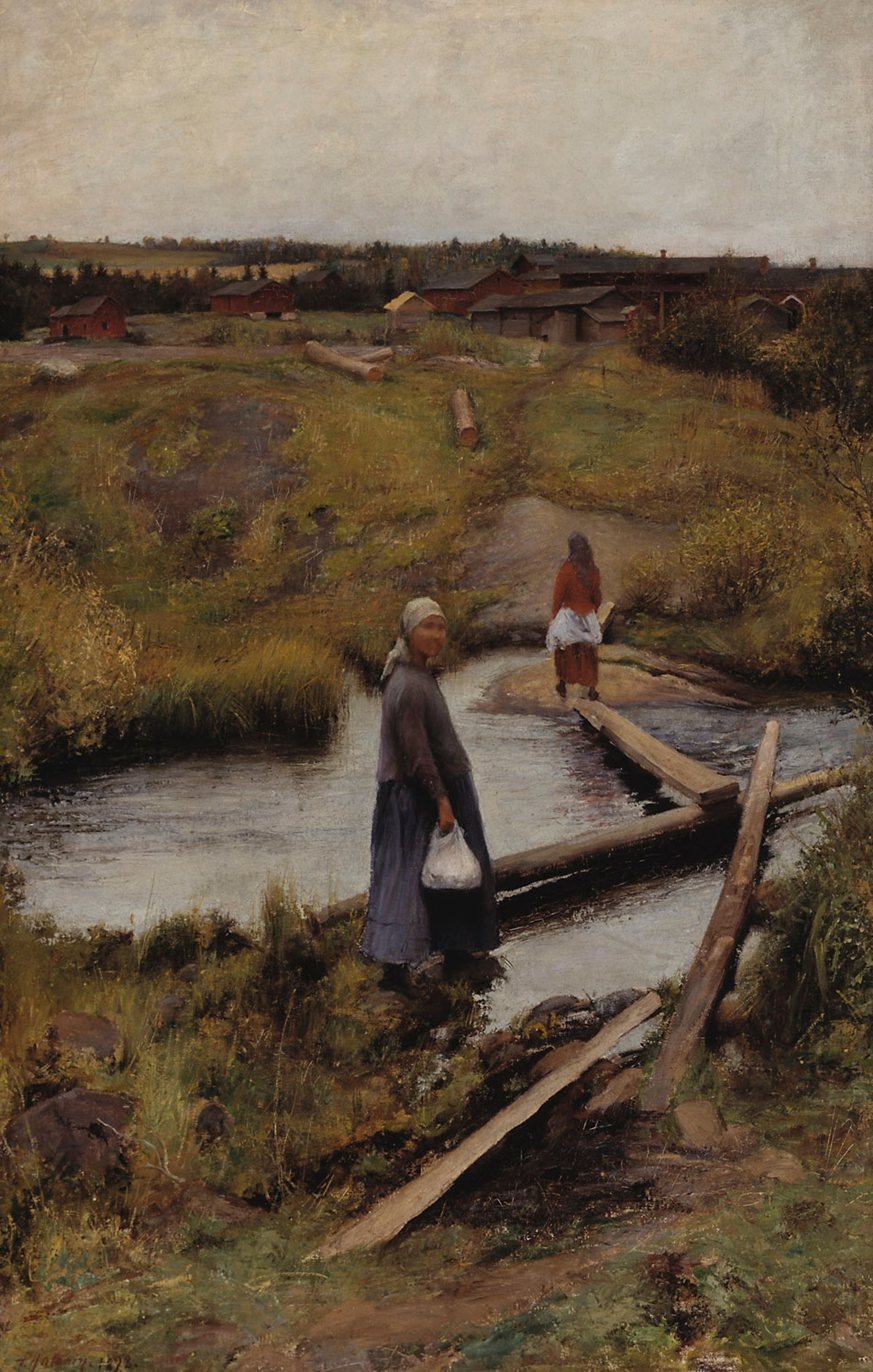
The Short Cut, 1892 (fi)

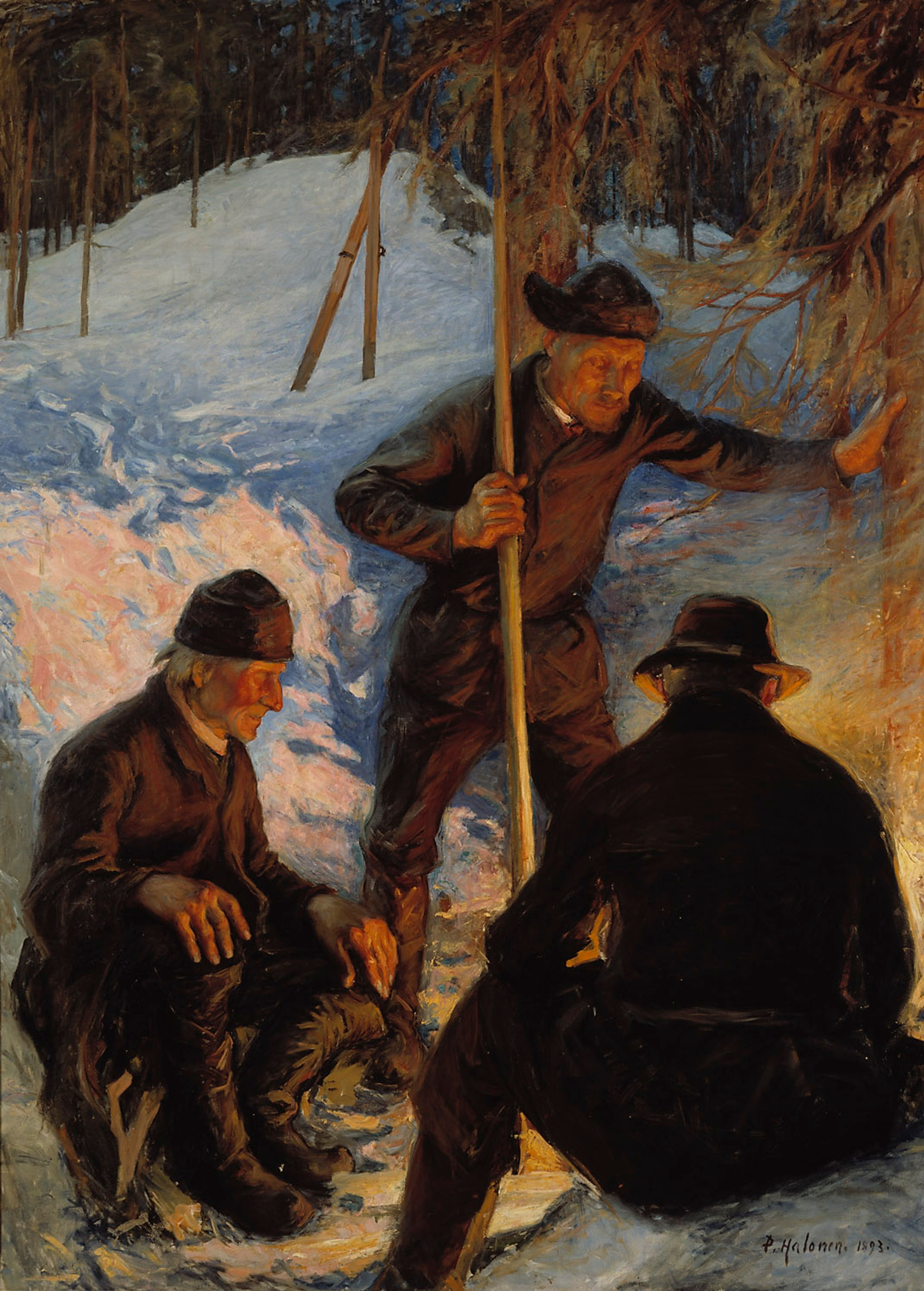
Lumberjacks Around a Campfire, 1893

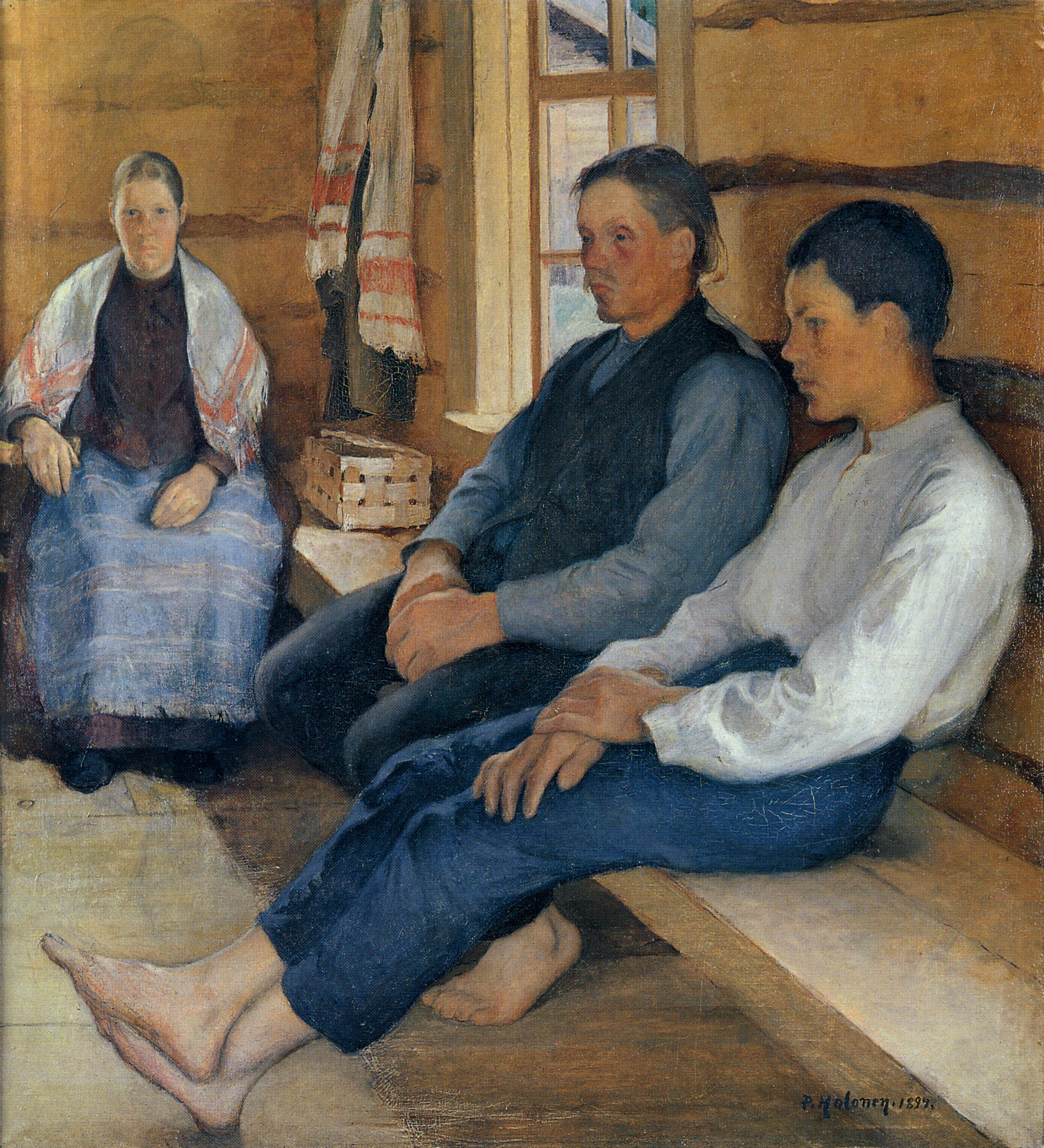
Sunday in a Settler Cottage, 1894

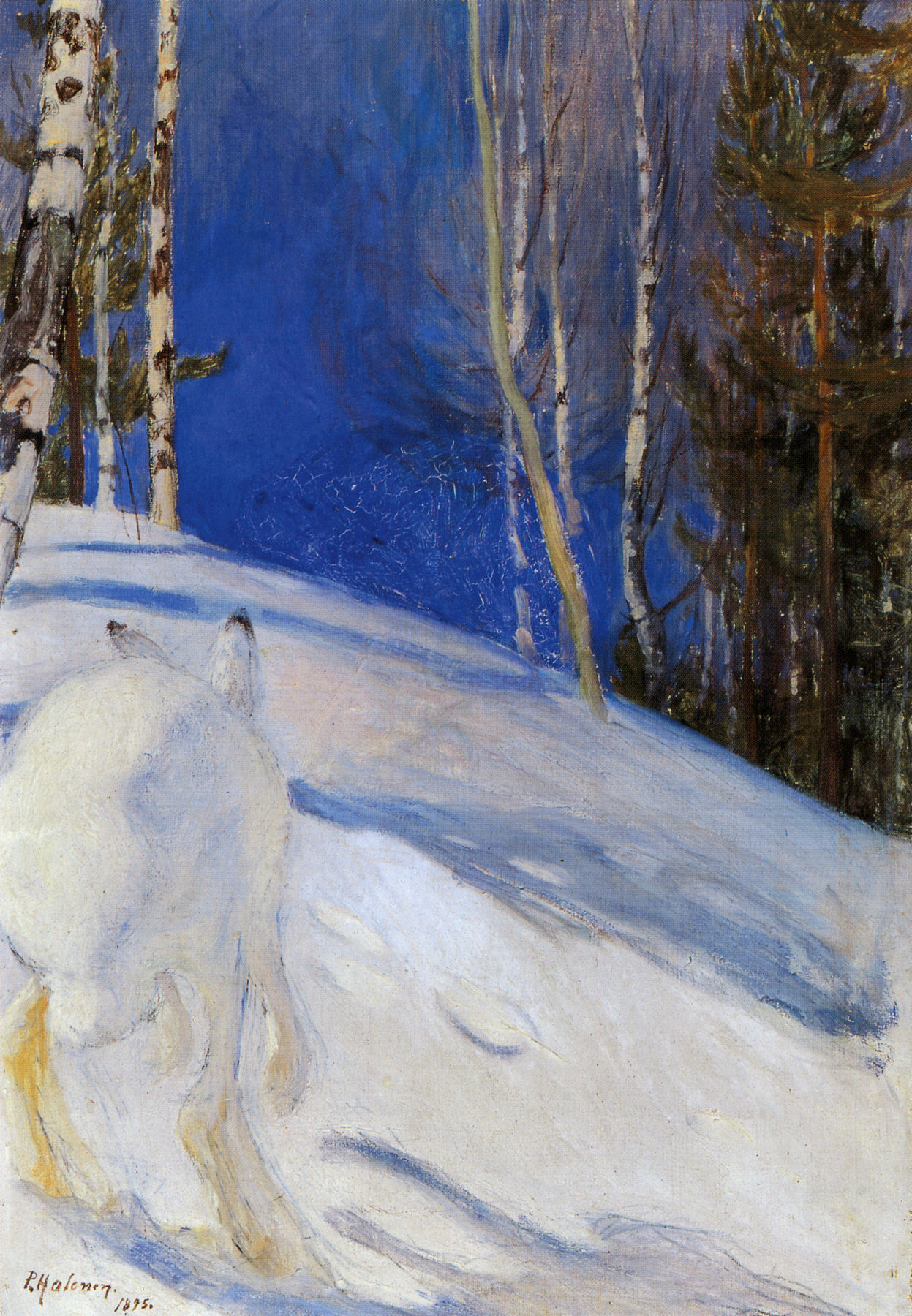
Winter Day, 1895 (fi)

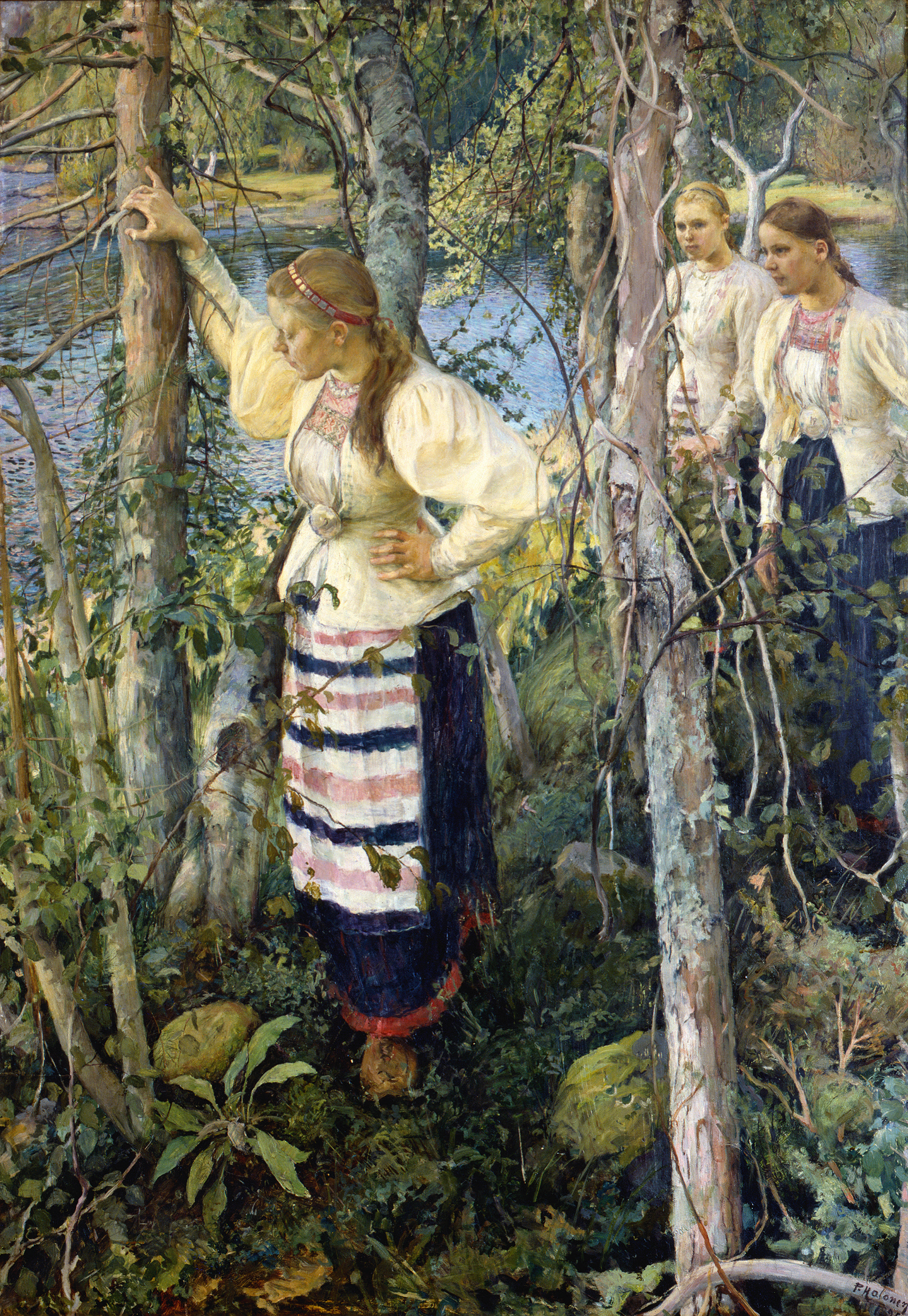
Maidens at the Headlands, 1895, from the 40th poem of Kalevala (fi)

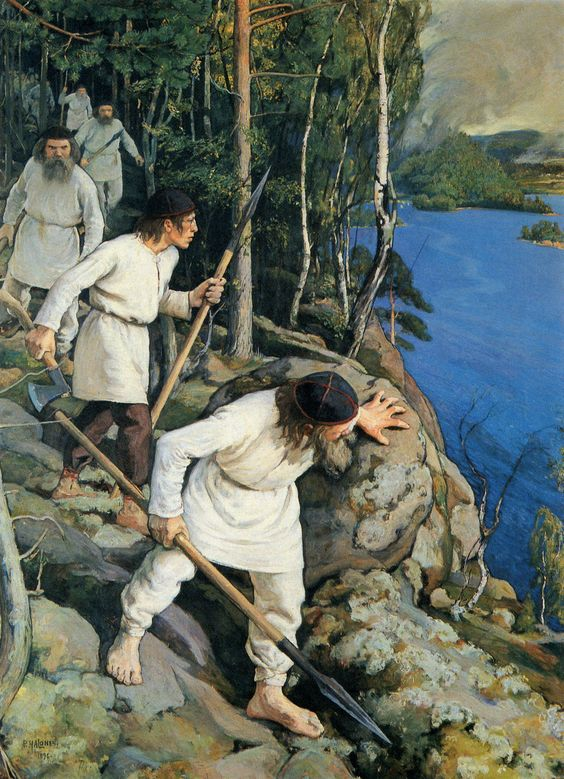
Against the Enemy, 1896 (fi)

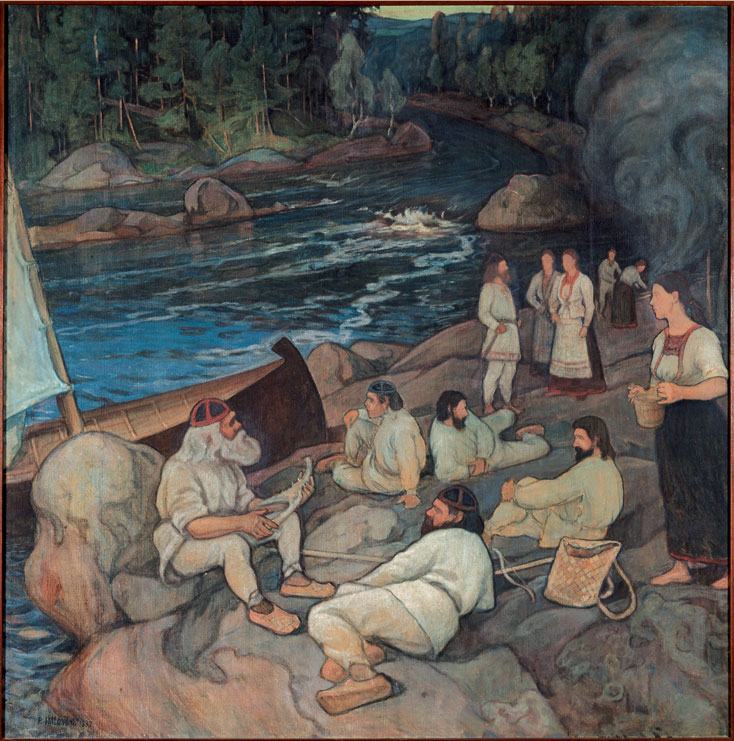
Väinämöinen's Play, 1897

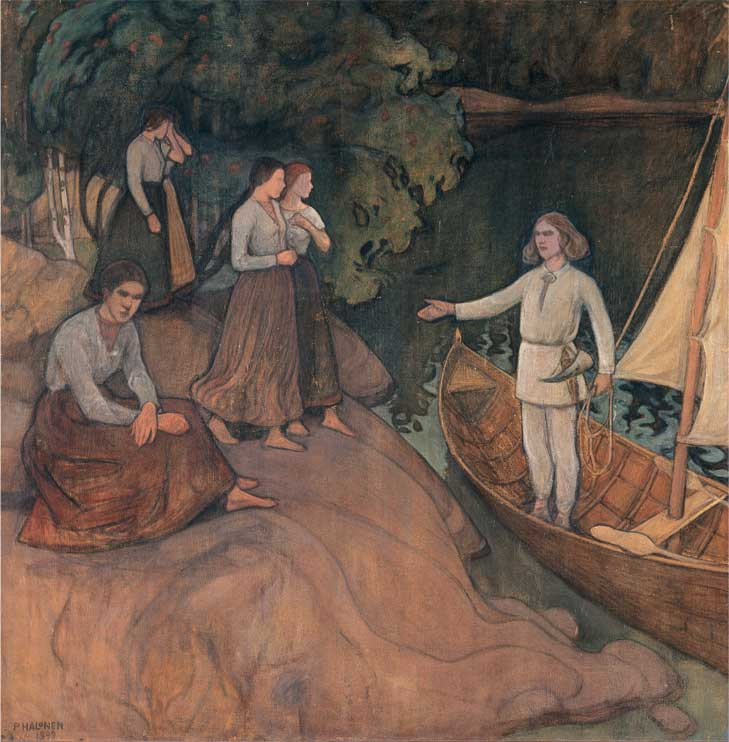
The Departure of Lemminkäinen from Saari, 1899

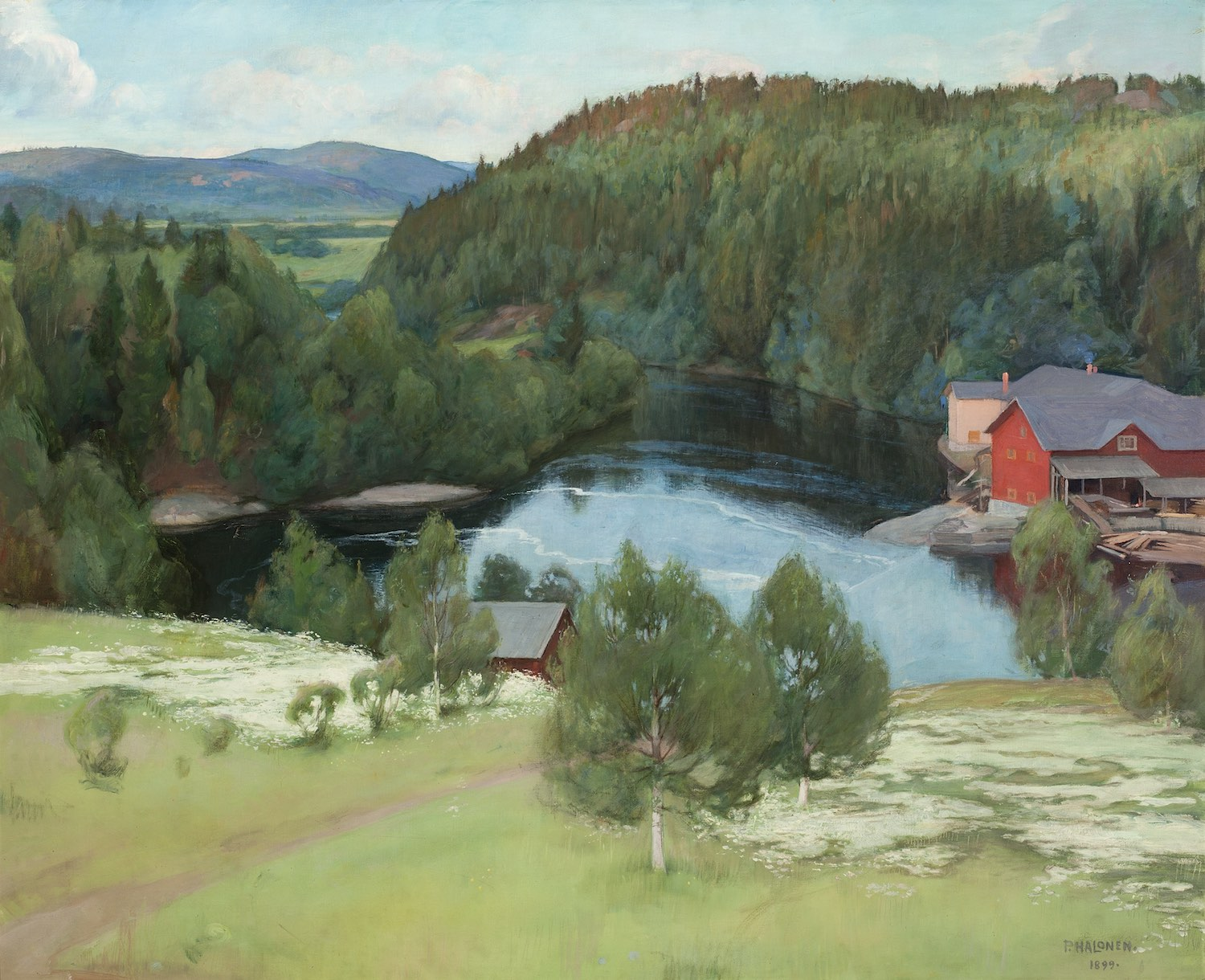
Myllykylä Sawmill, 1899

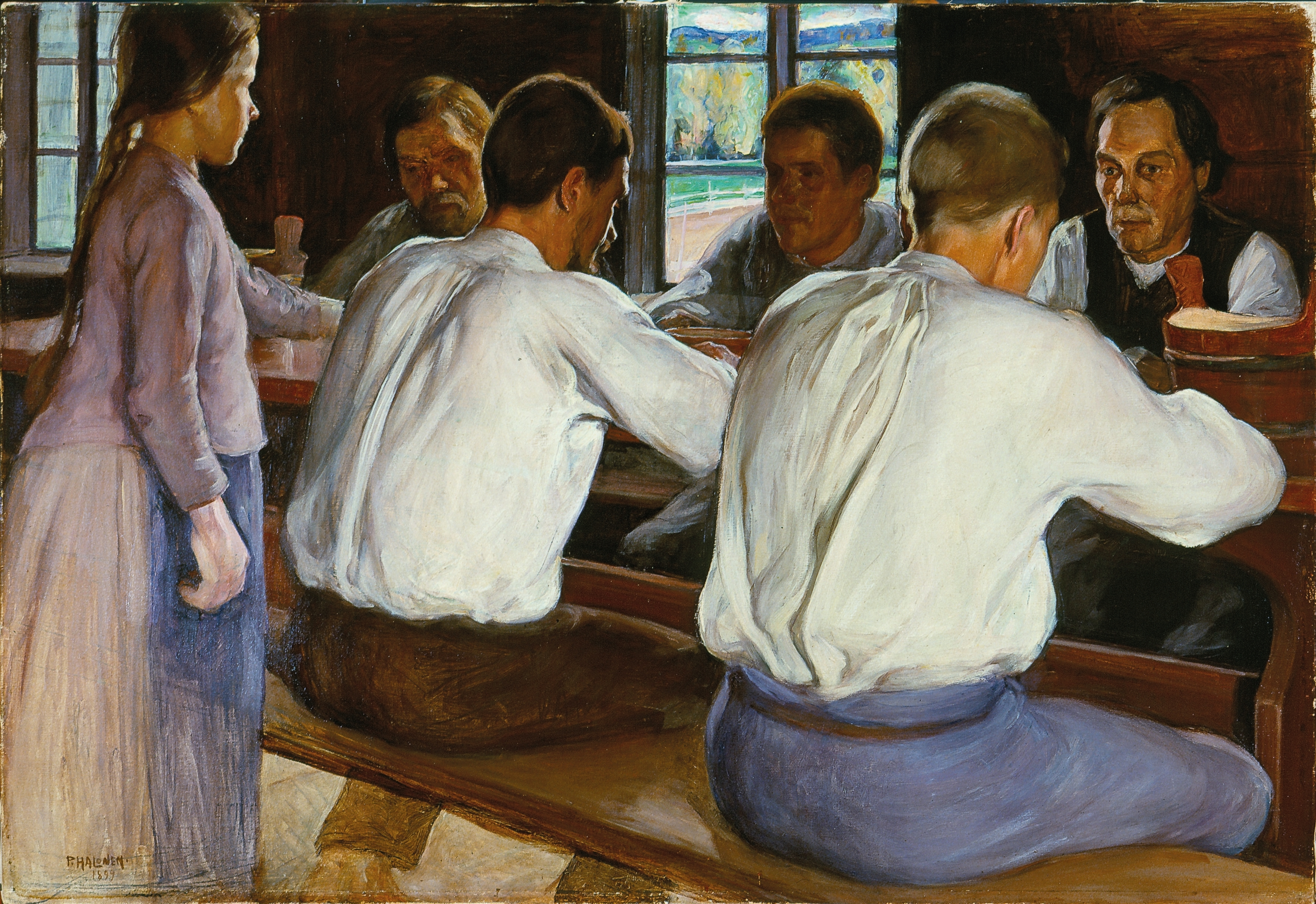
Meal, 1899

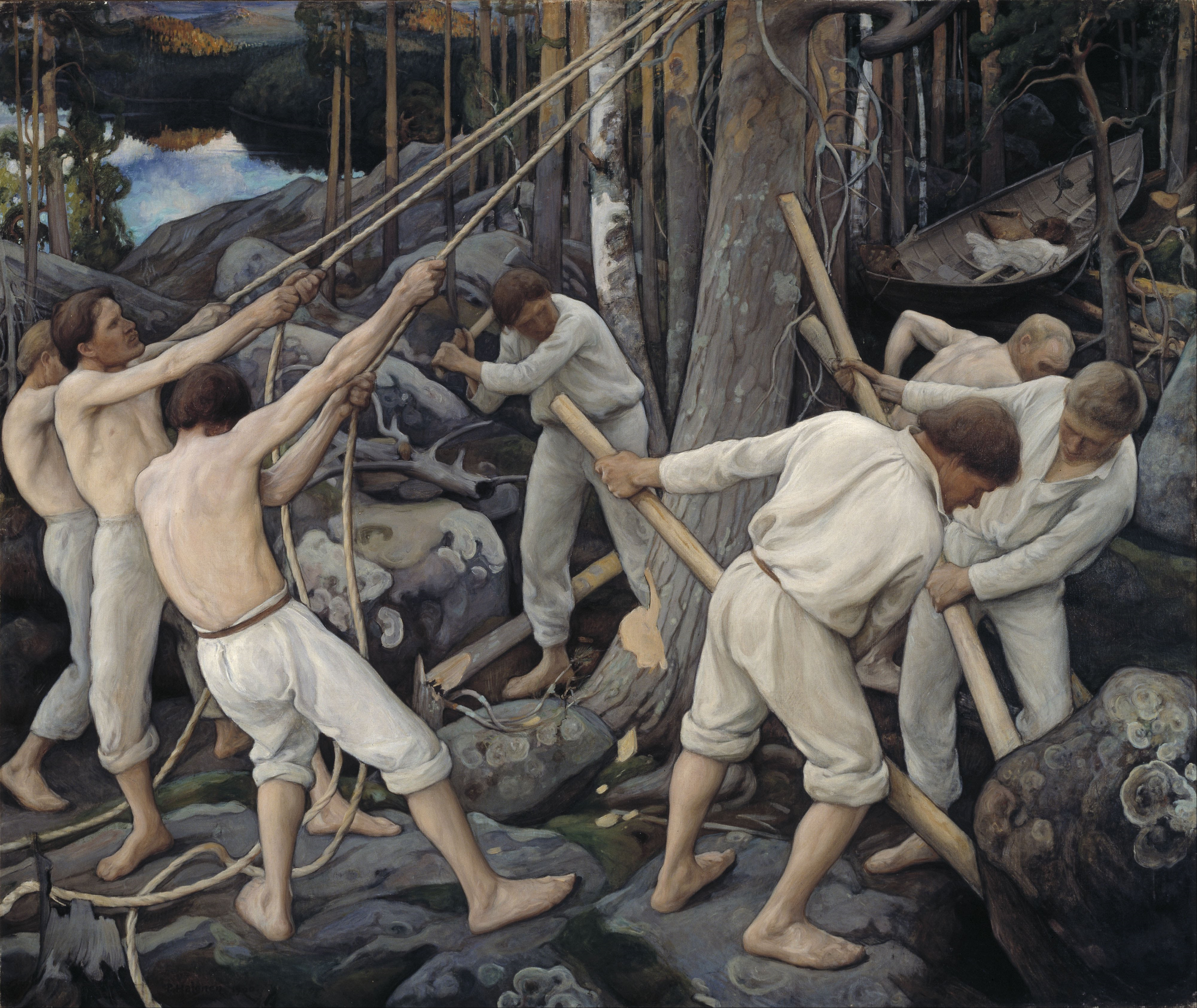
Pioneers in Karelia, 1900 (fi)

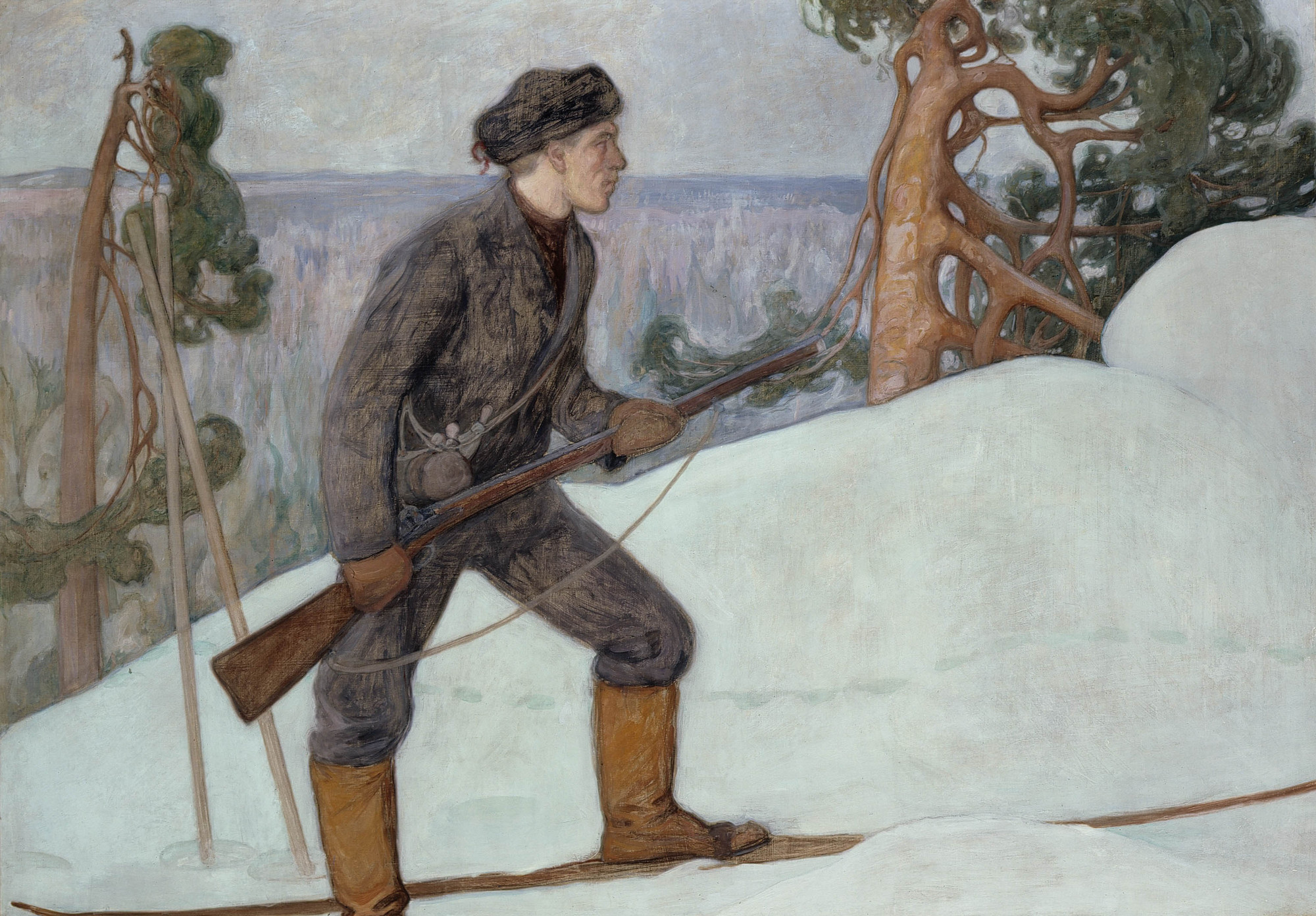
Lynx Hunter, 1900

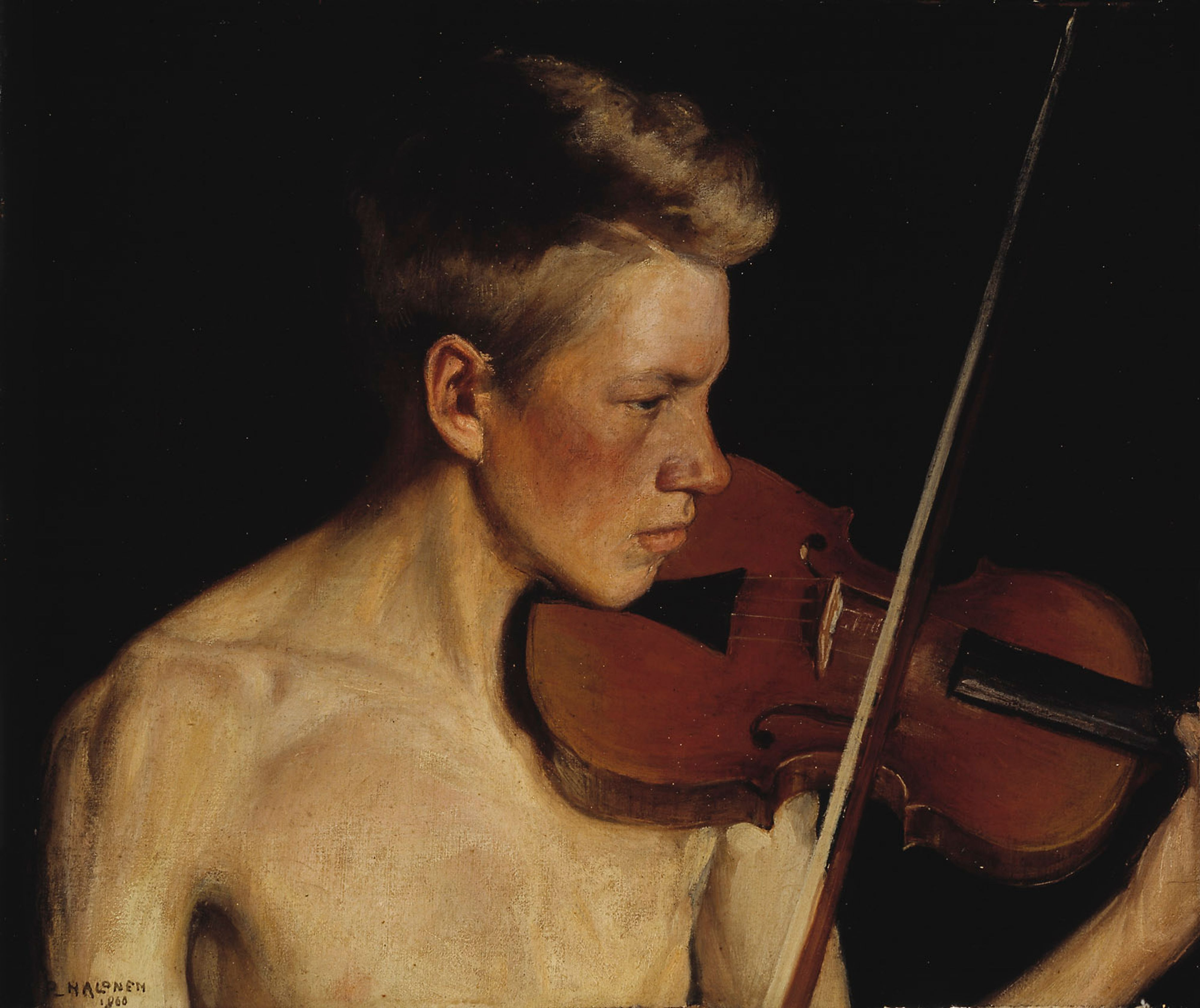
The Violinist, 1900 (fi)

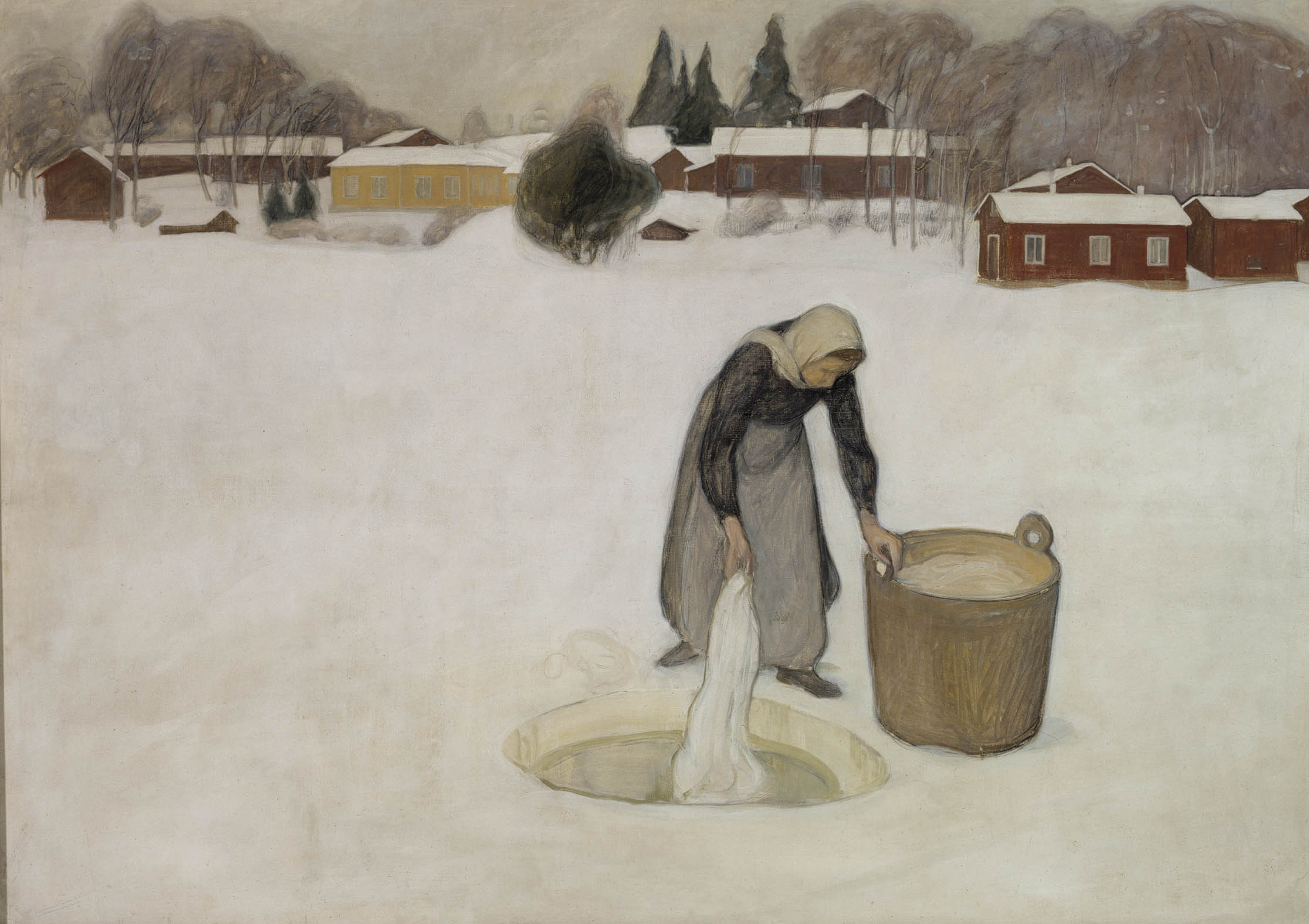
Washing on the Ice, 1900 (fi)

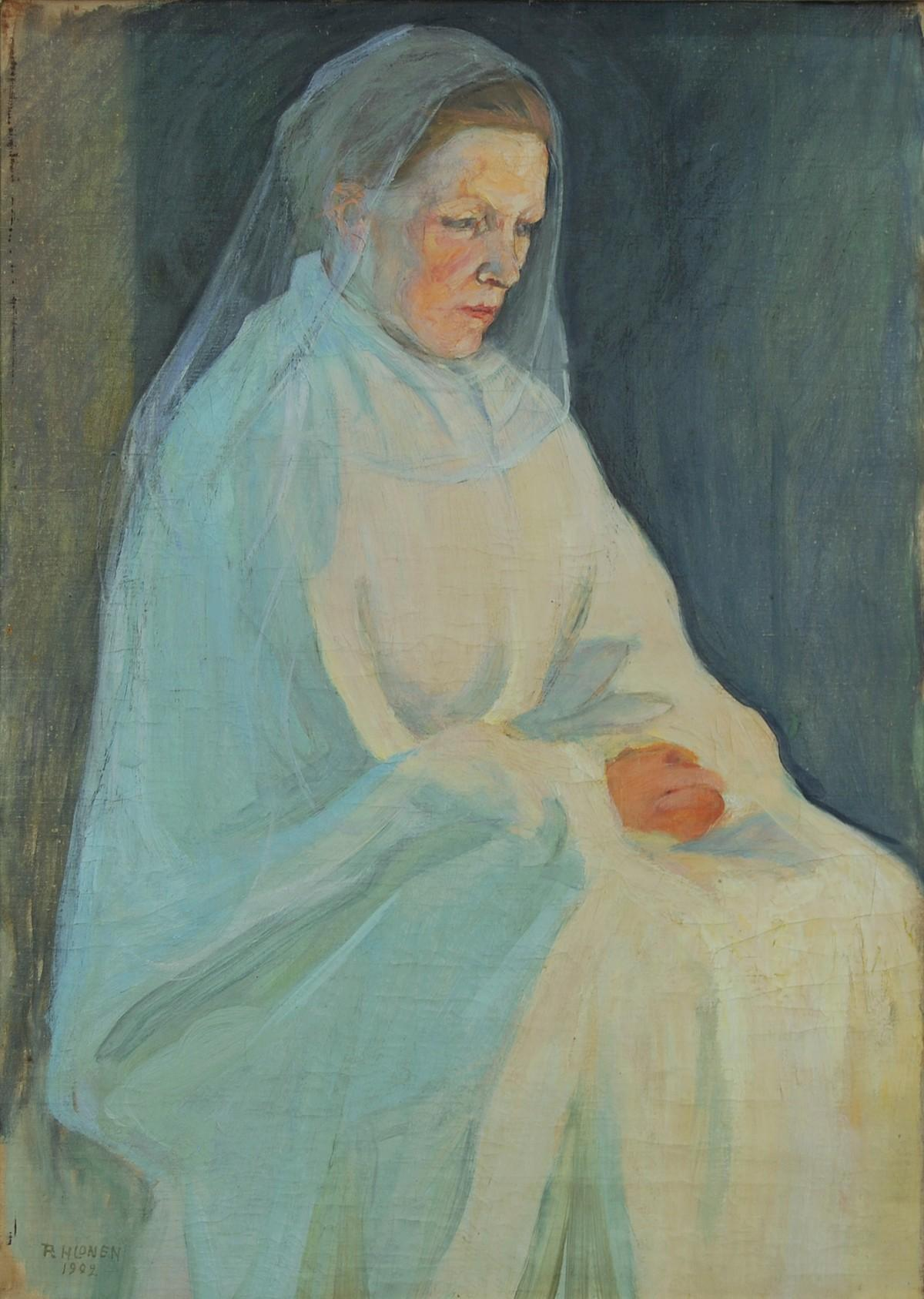
Madonna, 1902

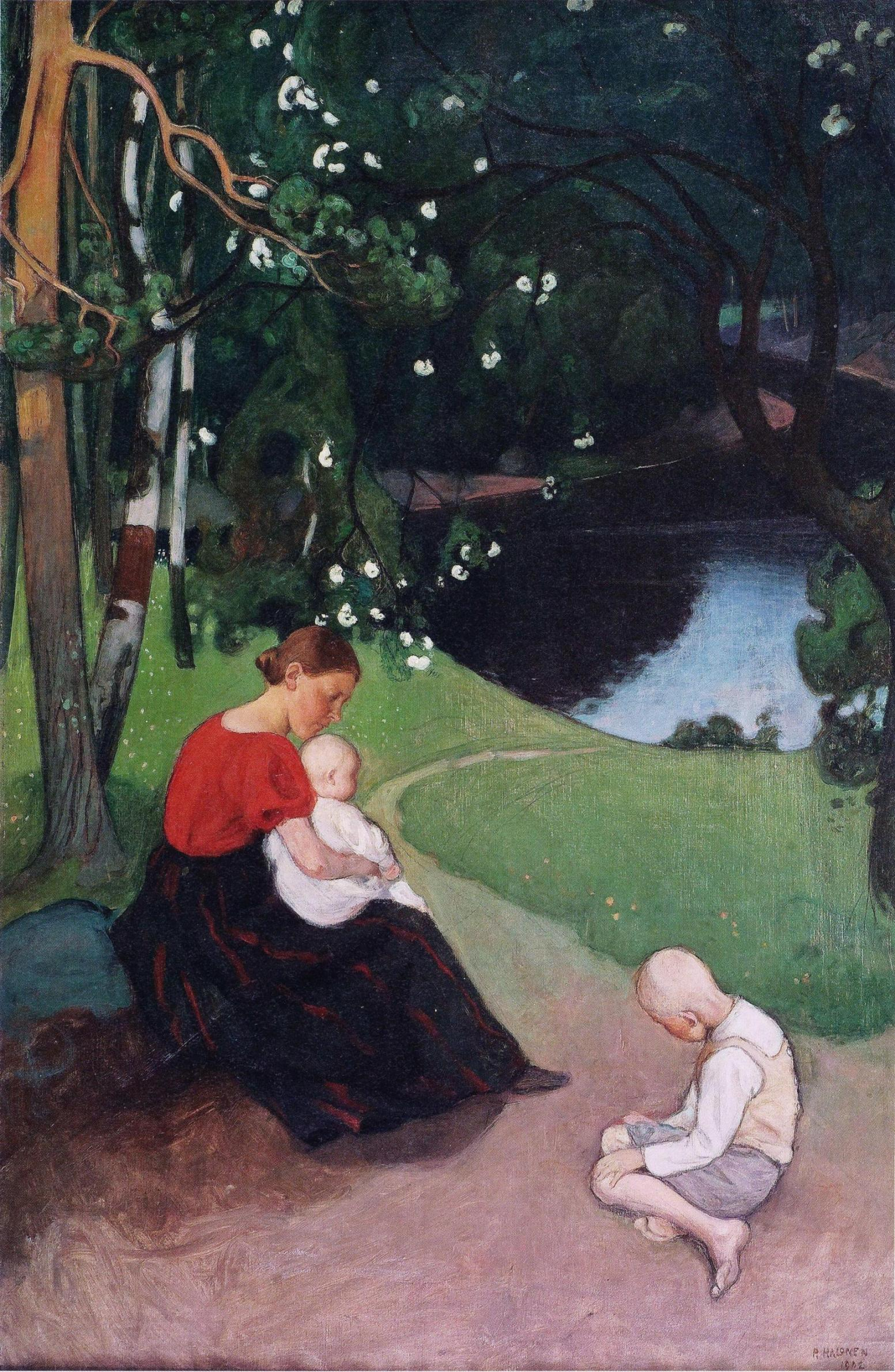
Grove of Tuonela, 1902

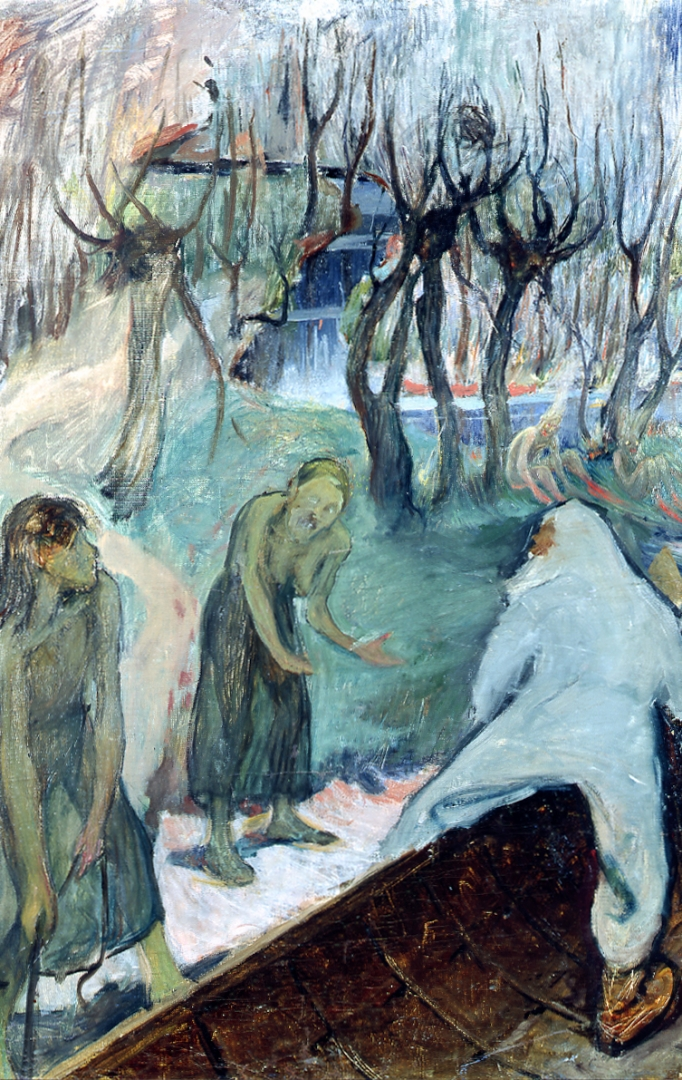
Väinämöinen in Tuonela, 1895–1910

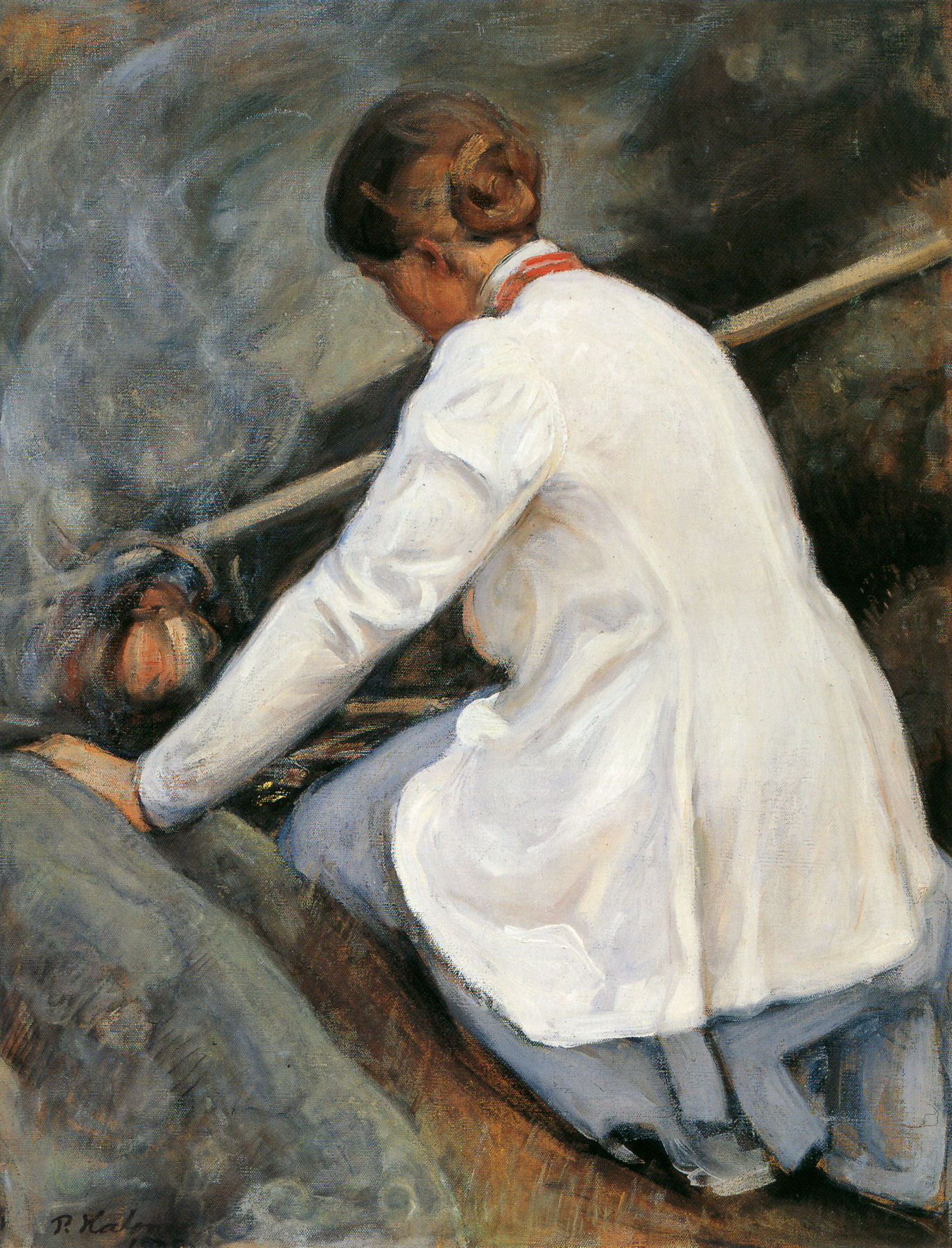
Coffee Maker, 1905

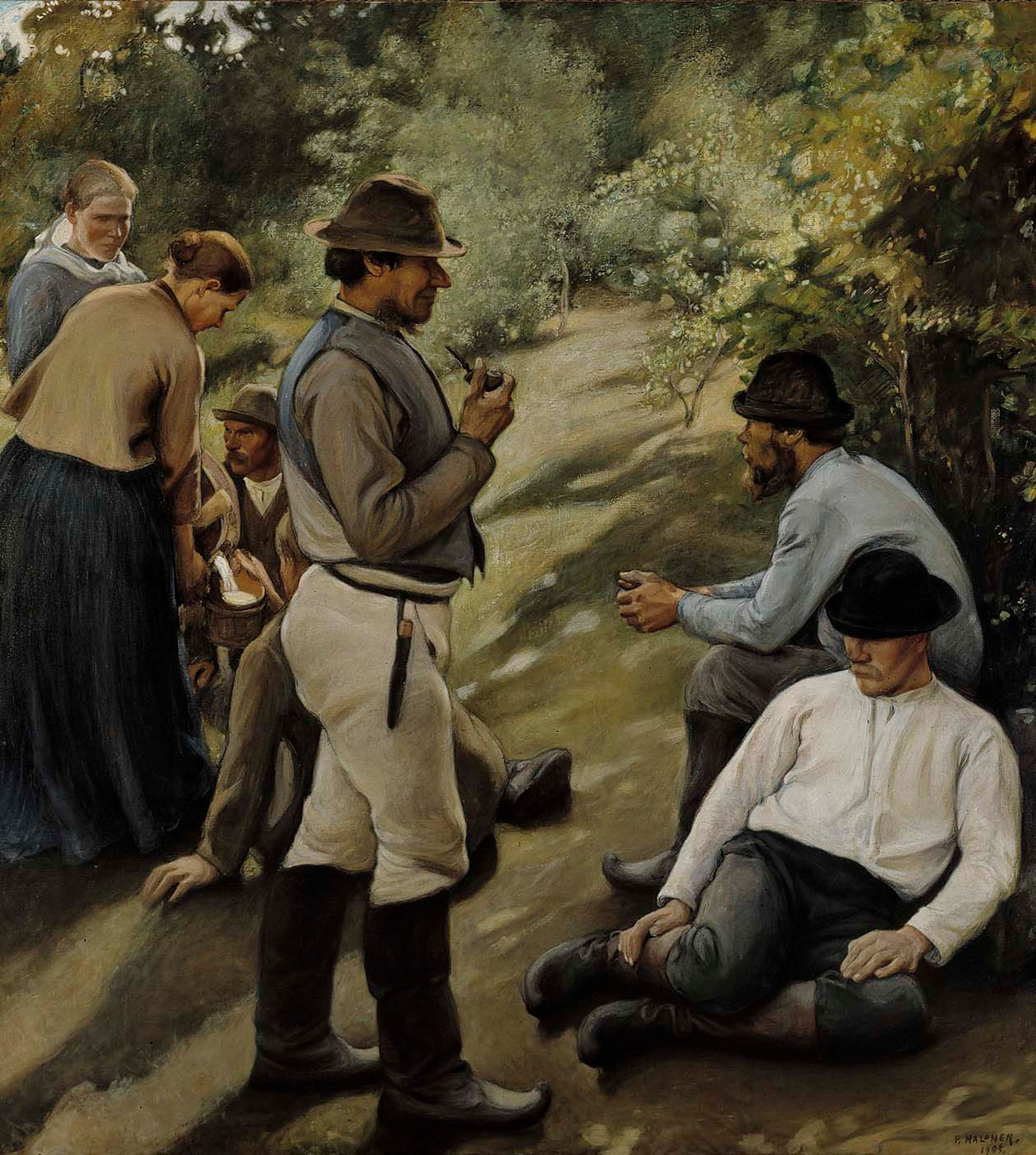
Hour of Rest, 1905

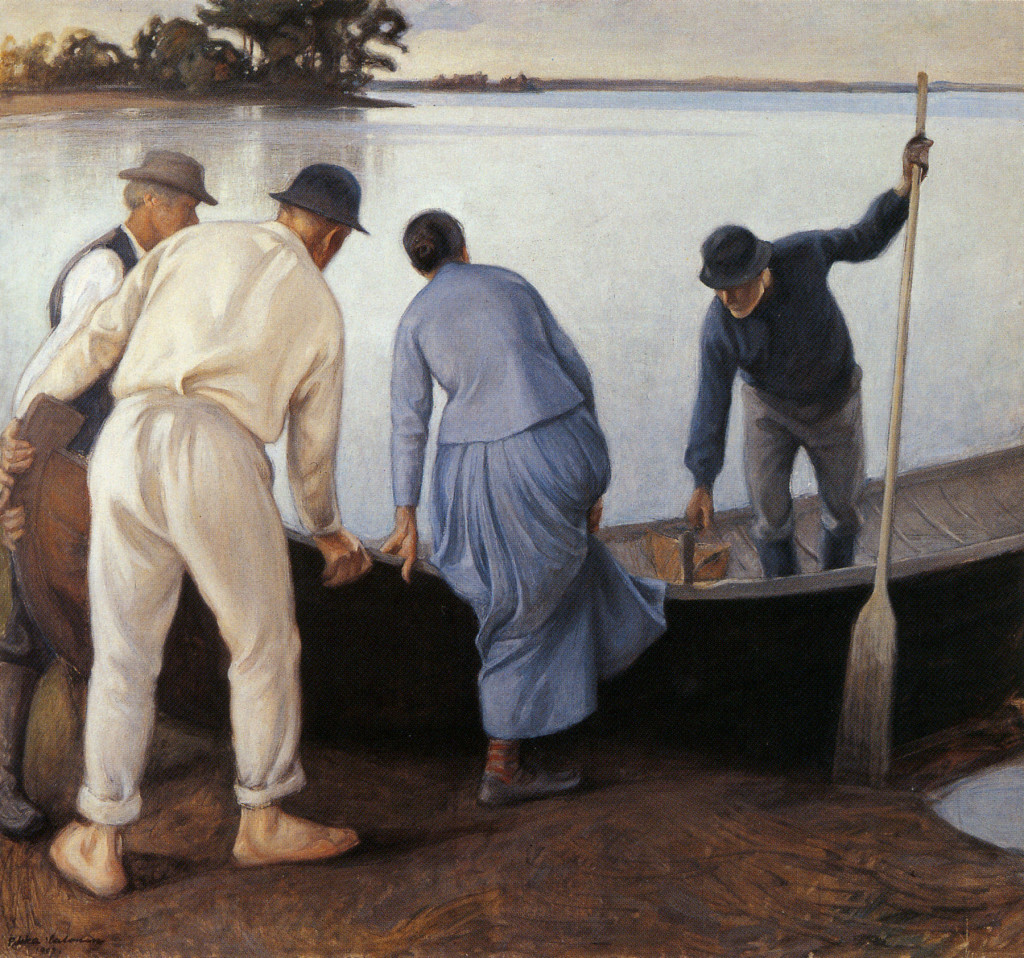
Returning from Work, 1907

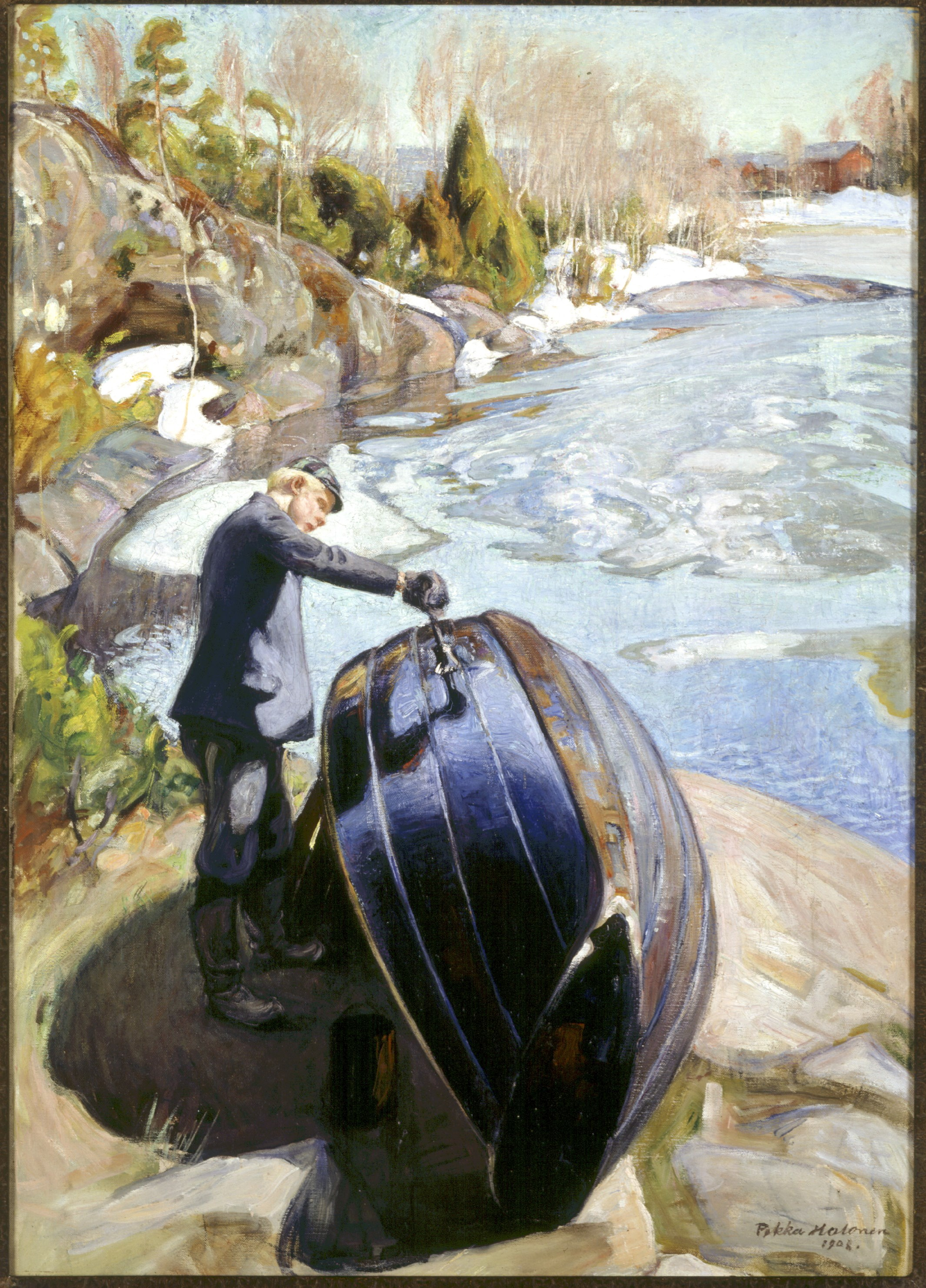
Boatman, 1908

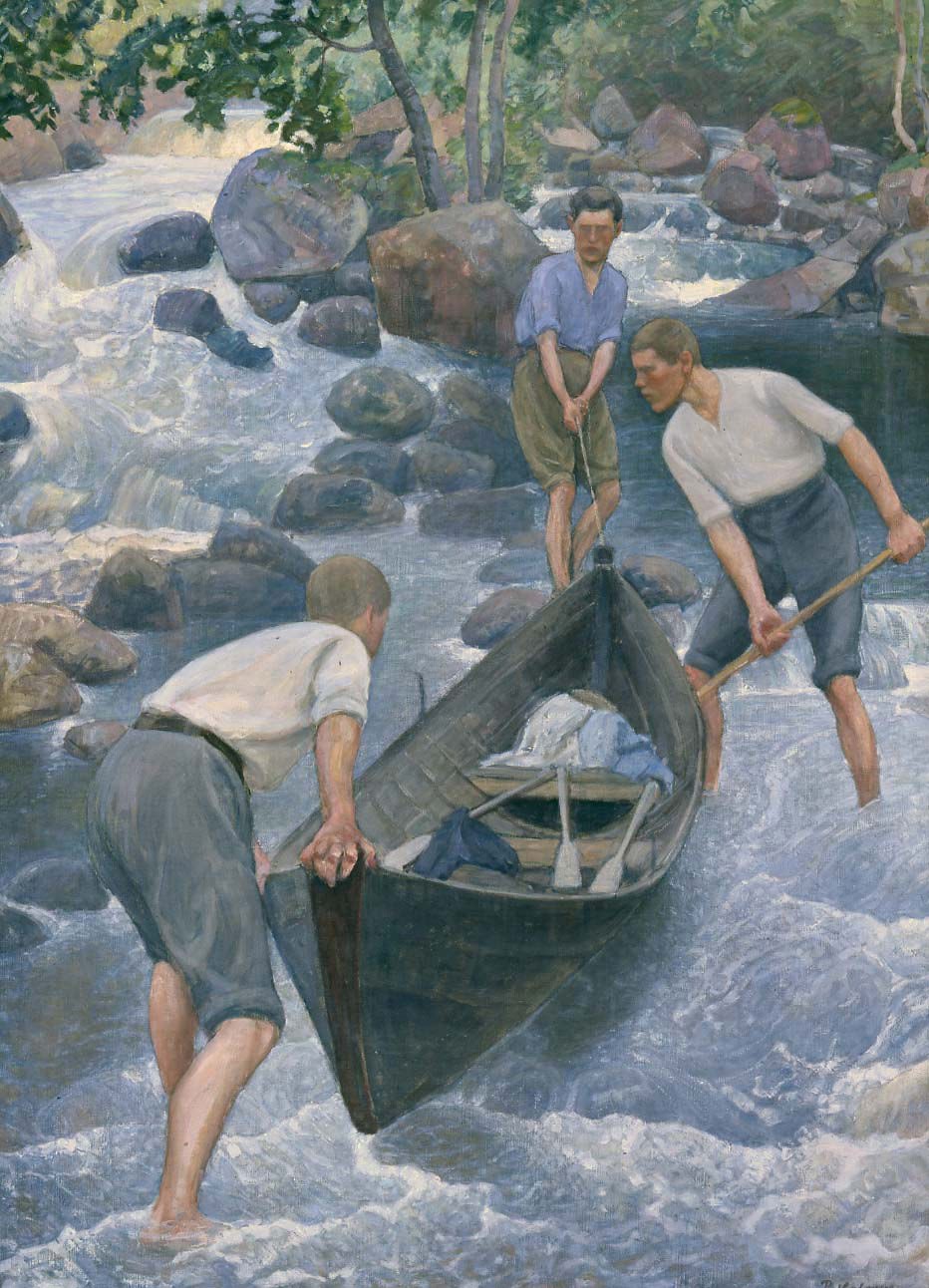
Summer Sporting, 1922

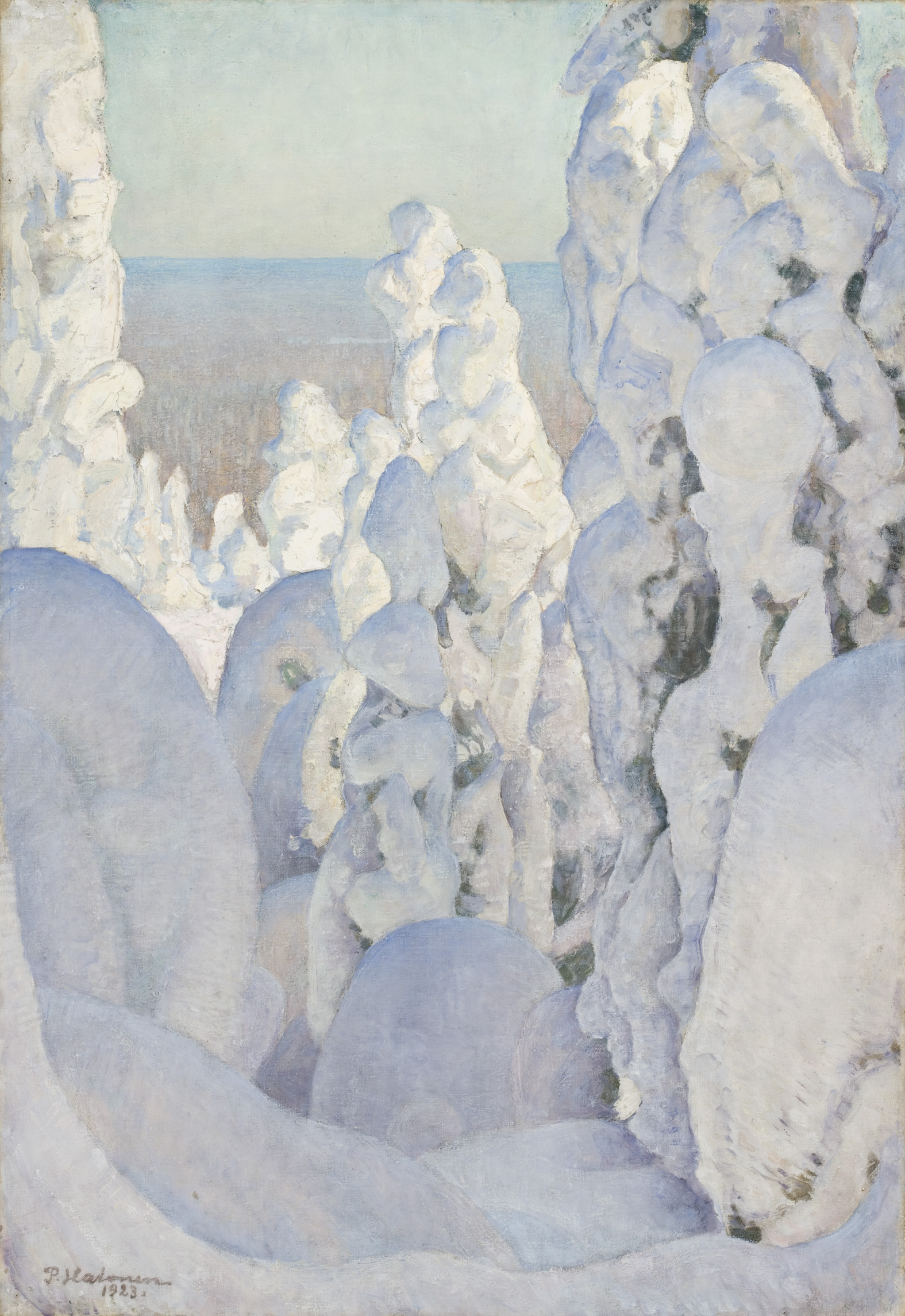
Winter Landscape from Kinahmi, 1923 (fi)

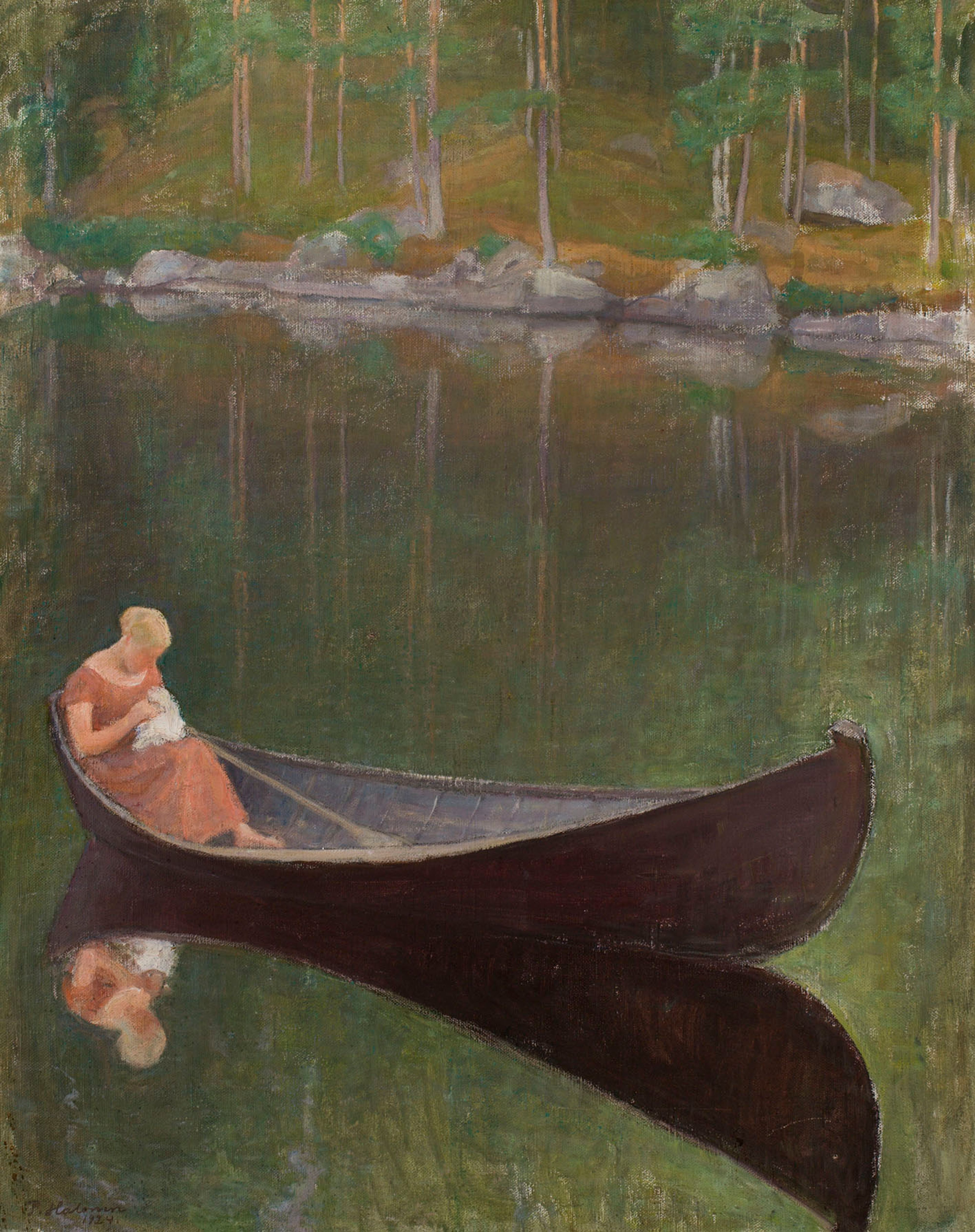
Woman in a Boat, 1924

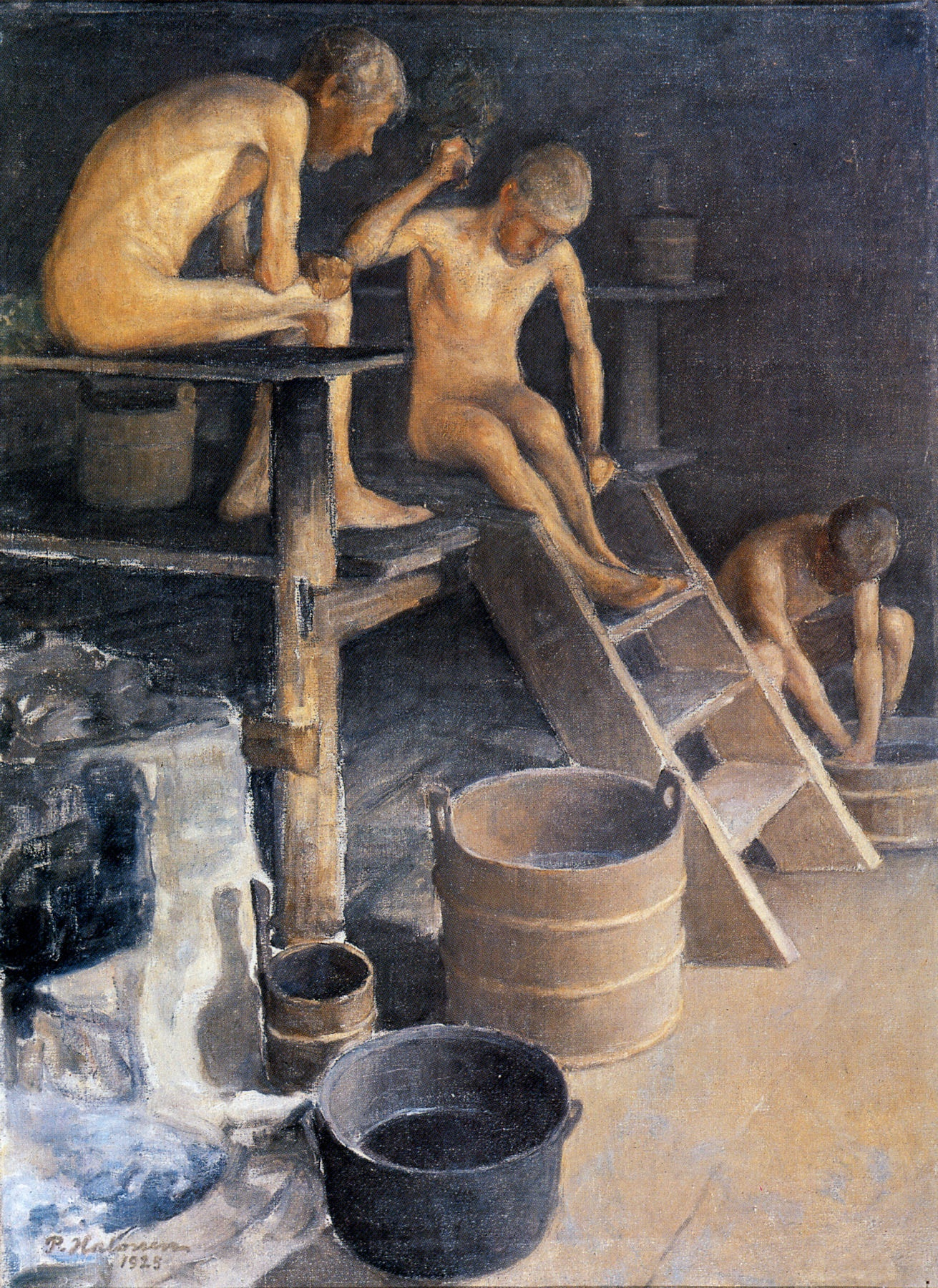
In the Sauna, 1925

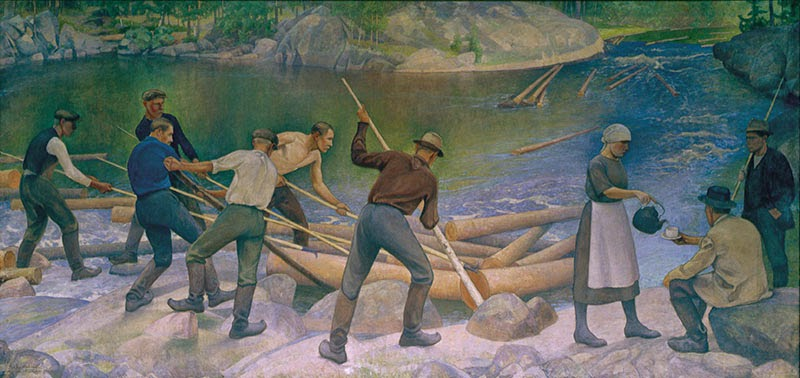
Log Drivers, 1925

== See also ==
- Golden Age of Finnish Art
- Finnish art
