= Valkjärvi (lake) =

Lake in the country of Finland

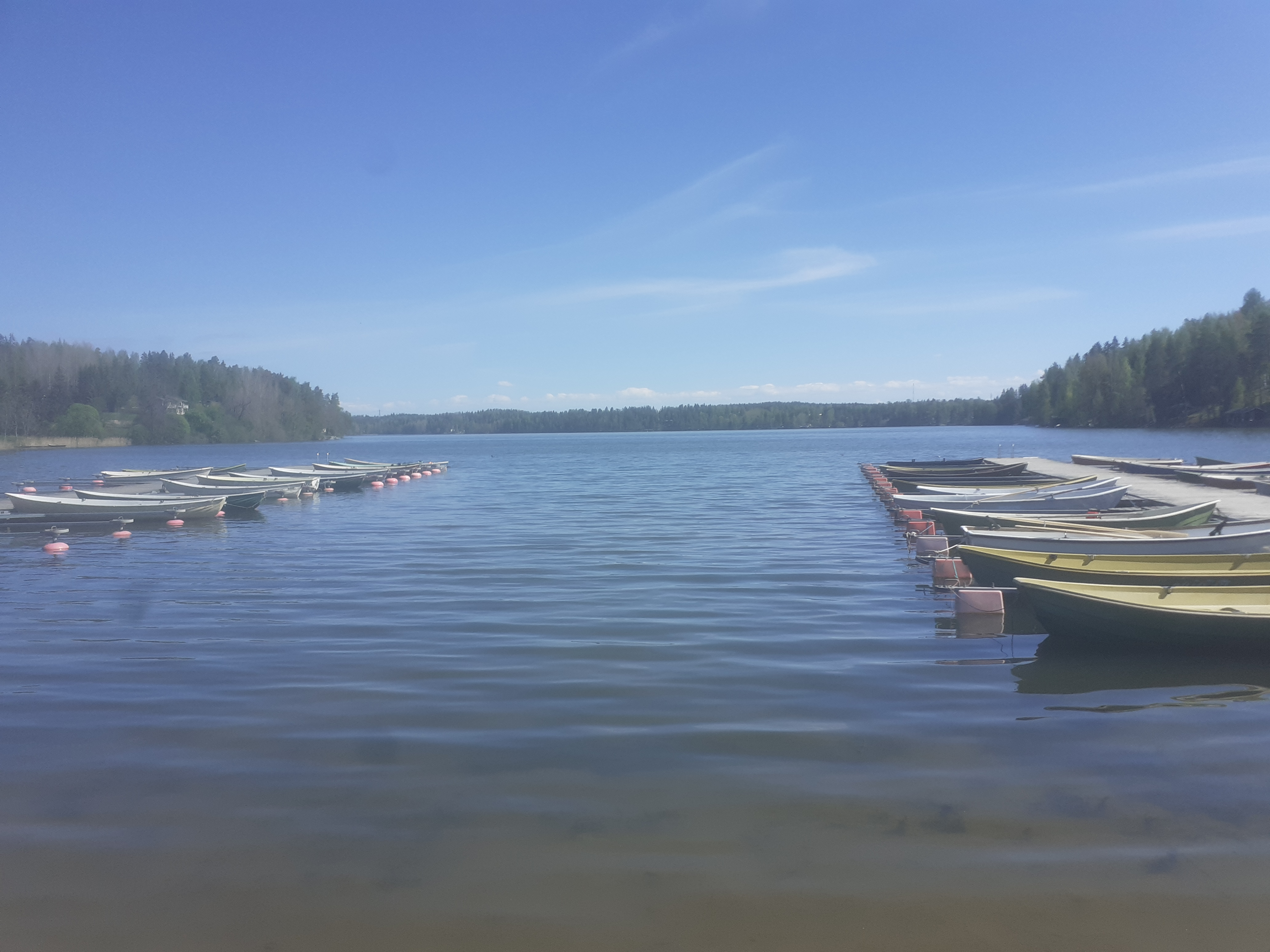
- View from the Lähtelä Beach.

- Location within Finland
- Location: Nurmijärvi, Uusimaa
- Coordinates: 60°24′09″N 24°43′12″E
- Primary outflows: Luhtajoki
- Basin countries: Finland
- Surface area: 1.5 km^{2} (0.58 sq mi)
- Max. depth: 12.2 m (40 ft)
- Surface elevation: 32.8 m (108 ft)
- Settlements: Klaukkala

Valkjärvi is a lake located in the Nurmijärvi municipality in Southern Finland. It is an island-free lake in the immediate vicinity of Klaukkala's urban area. The water flows from the lake along the Luhtajoki River all the way to the Vantaa River.

Valkjärvi is the lushest lake of Nurmijärvi, and it is part of the Nurmijärvi's lake monitoring program of the Central Uusimaa Environment Centre (Keski-Uudenmaan ympäristökeskus) due to its poor oxygen values near the bottom of the lake, which are observed especially in summer and winter under ice. Blue-green algae are quite common in the lake; in July 2015, the phytoplankton in the lake with the highest total biomass consisted of 40% cyanobacteria and 29% cryptomonad.

Despite all this, Valkjärvi has great recreational value and there are quite a lot of both permanent and holiday settlements around the lake. There are two beaches at the southern end of Valkjärvi: Tiiranranta Beach and Lähtelä Beach.

== See also ==
- Lake Sääksi
