= Lake Tuusula =

Lake in Uusimaa region, Finland

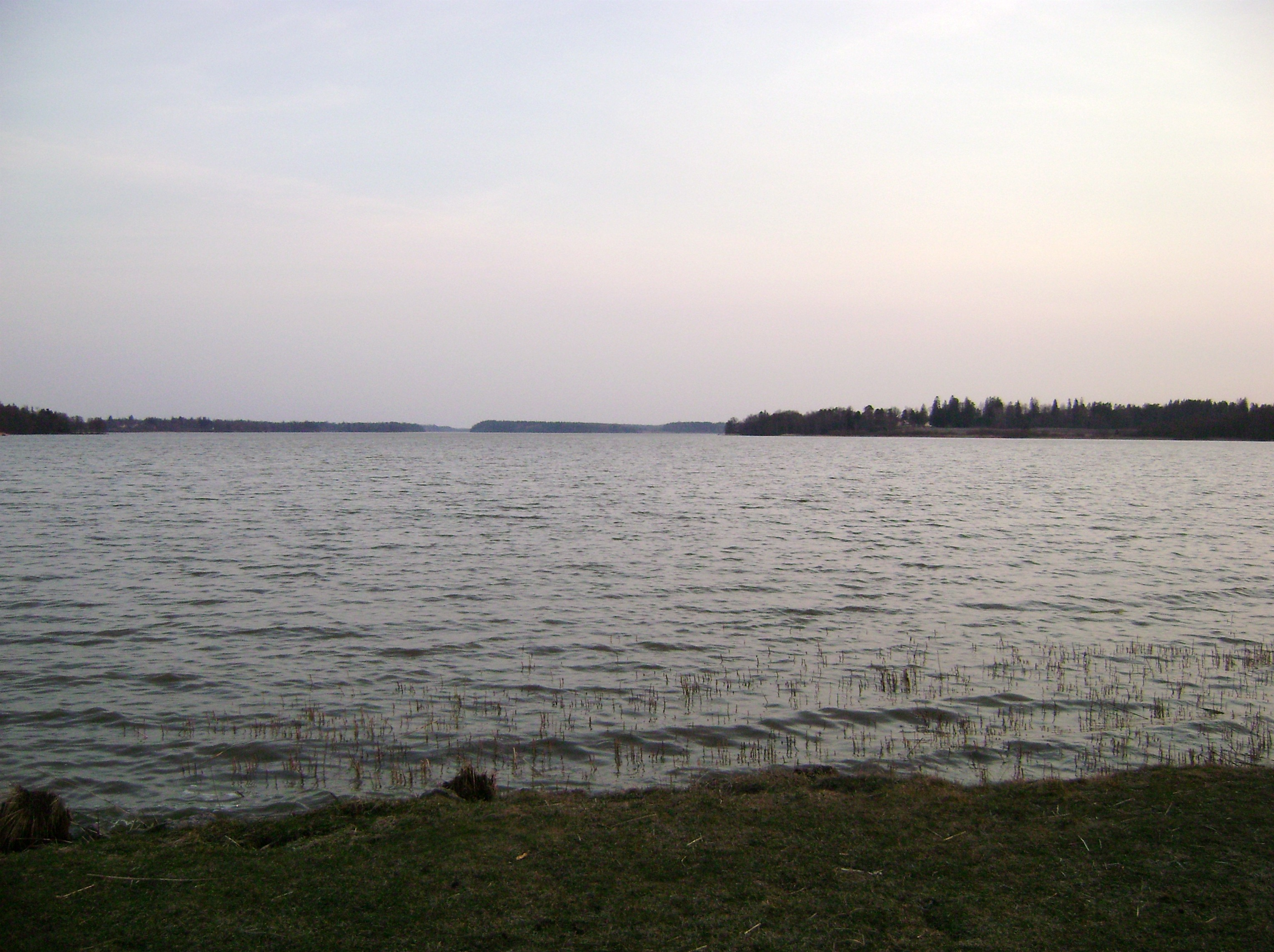
- View to south from Tervanokka, Järvenpää.

- Location within Finland
- Location: Uusimaa
- Coordinates: 60°26′N 025°03′E
- Primary outflows: Tuusulanjoki
- Basin countries: Finland
- Max. length: 8 km (5.0 mi)
- Surface area: 6 km^{2} (2.3 sq mi)
- Average depth: 3.2 m (10 ft)
- Surface elevation: 37.8 m (124 ft)
- Settlements: Tuusula, Järvenpää

Lake Tuusula or Lake Tuusulanjärvi (Finnish: Tuusulanjärvi; Swedish: Tusby träsk) is a lake on the border of the municipalities of Tuusula and Järvenpää in Southern Finland. The lake has an area of 6.0 square kilometres. Since the beginning of the twentieth century the shores of Lake Tuusula has been an artist's colony. The houses of Aino and Jean Sibelius, Juhani Aho, Pekka Halonen, Eero Järnefelt, Joonas Kokkonen and Aleksis Kivi are on the edges of the lake.

The Lake Tuusulanjärvi Water Protection Association has taken action to save the lake from eutrophication effects since the early 1970s. Apart from wintertime water aeration and cyprinid fish removal, some additional water is being fed into the Lake via the 120 kilometers (75 mi) long Päijänne Water Tunnel.

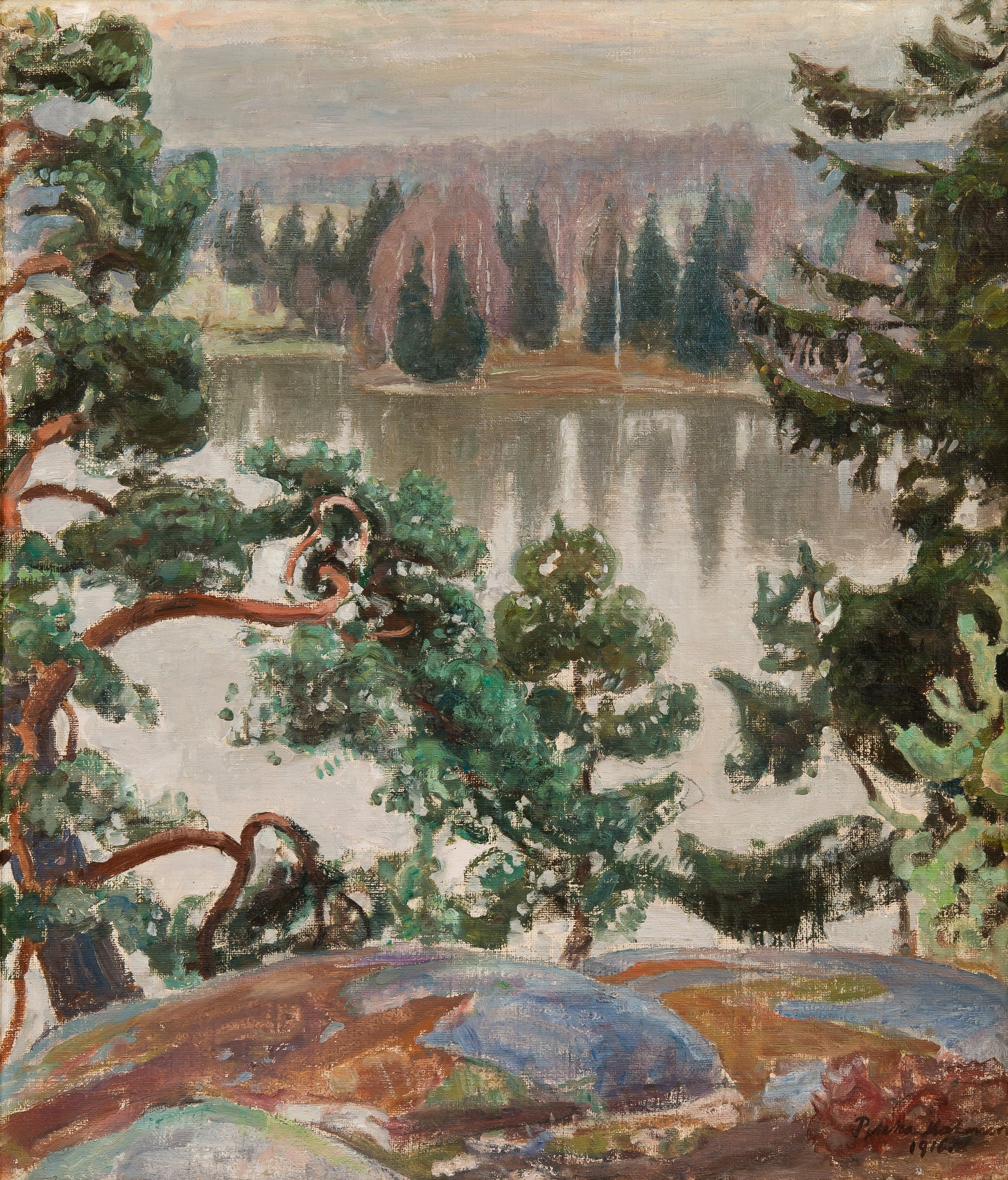
Pekka Halonen's From Sarvikallio (1916) depicts Lake Tuusula as seen from its western shore

== See also ==
- List of lakes in Finland
- Lake Sääksi
