= Sääksjärvi (Nurmijärvi) =

Lake in Uusimaa, Finland

- Sääksi
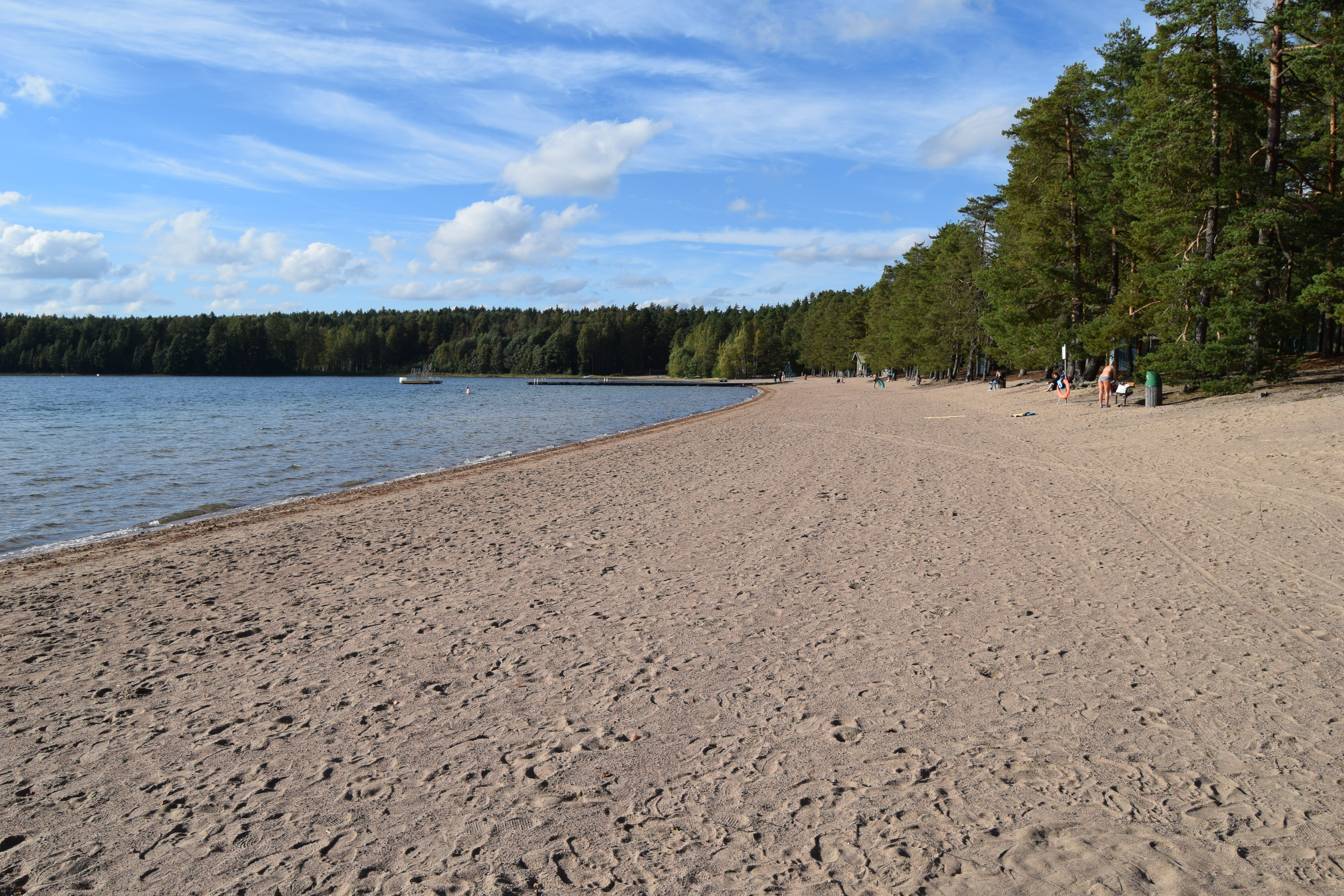
- A sandy beach of Sääksjärvi
- Interactive map of Sääksjärvi
- Location: Uusimaa
- Coordinates: 60°30′30″N 24°40′00″E
- Basin countries: Finland
- Surface area: 2.6 square kilometres (1.0 sq mi)
- Max. depth: 8.5 metres (28 ft)
- Settlements: Nurmijärvi, Hyvinkää

Sääksjärvi (also known as Sääksi) is a 260-hectare lake in Uusimaa, Finland. It is located on the border between the municipalities of Nurmijärvi and Hyvinkää, on the ridge formation called Salpausselkä. The villages of Röykkä and Kiljava are located near Sääksjärvi.

The hydronym Sääksjärvi is found throughout Finland, generally in reference to ospreys (sääksi) nesting by the lakes.

Sääksjärvi is a groundwater lake without an outflow, and its water changes through the soil. The lake is very even in depth and the deepest part of the lake is about eight meters deep. The water in the lake is very clean, and the lake has a good oxygen situation. Alkalinity, which indicates the buffering capacity of lake water, is very low. Sääksjärvi is one of Finland's largest spring-based lakes.

The approximately 800-meter-long Sääksi Beach is popular especially among the residents of Nurmijärvi and Hyvinkää, but it also attracts visitors from other parts of Uusimaa.

The lake has been said to have served as a model for fictional Lake Ilvesjärvi in the 1870 novel The Seven Brothers by Aleksis Kivi.

== See also ==
- Hiidenvesi
- Lake Tuusula
- Valkjärvi (lake)
