= Luhtajoki =

River in the country of Finland

Coordinates: 60°20.890′N 024°47.230′E

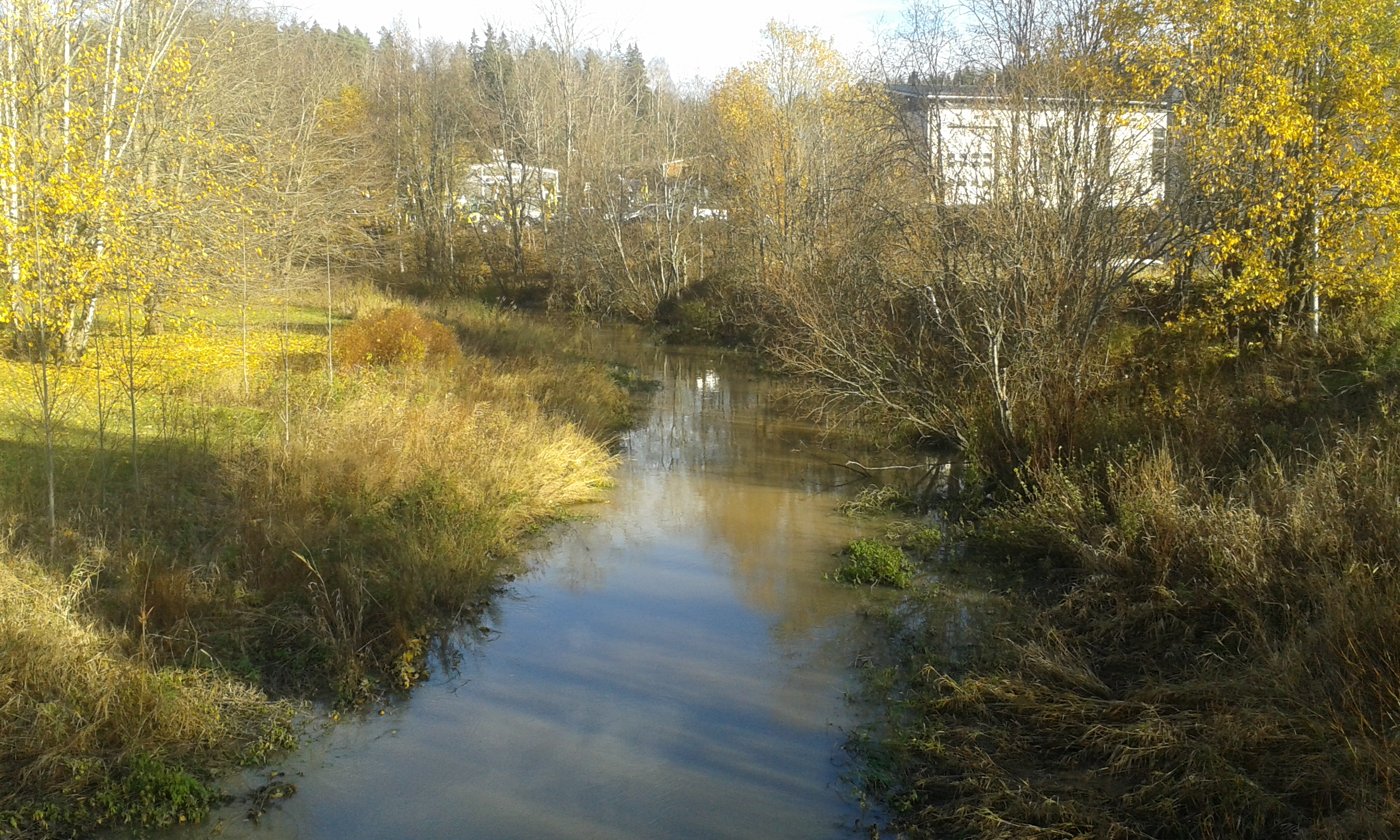
Luhtajoki in Klaukkala, near the Vantaa border

Luhtajoki (Finnish pronunciation: [ˈluhtɑˌjoki]; lit. 'flood-meadow river') is a 46-kilometre (29 mi) long river in Southern Finland. The river starts from Hyvinkää and flows as Kyläjoki into the church village of Nurmijärvi, where it flows 23 kilometers (14 mi) into the Klaukkala and from there to the River Vantaa where it connects.

The Luhtajoki River is lush and its water is clayey. The river is subject to both point and diffuse loads. The loads are caused by, for example, sewage load and agriculture. There are extensive floodplains in the area. The river has been sprouted several times. The Luhtajoki River is classified as satisfactory and the River Kyläjoki as passable. The river is also quite demanding for canoeing due to its eutrophication and sometimes its low amount of water.

== See also ==
- Kuhakoski
- Valkjärvi (lake)
