= Vantaanjoki =

River of Southern Finland

Coordinates: 60°13′N 024°59′E

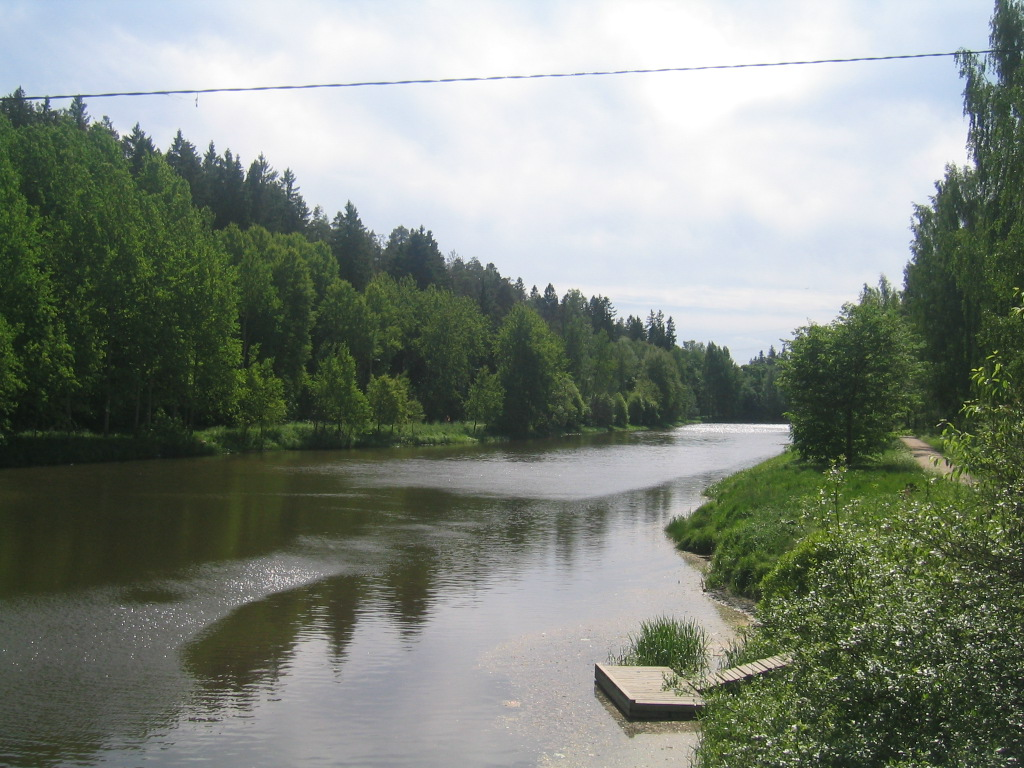
- The Vantaa in June 2008

Location
- Country: Finland

Physical characteristics
- Source: Lake Erkylänjärvi
  - location: Hausjärvi
- Mouth: Gulf of Finland
  - location: Vanhankaupunginselkä, Helsinki

Vantaanjoki (Swedish: Vanda å) is a 101-kilometre (63 mi) long river in Southern Finland. The river starts from the lake Erkylänjärvi in Hausjärvi and flows into the Gulf of Finland at Vanhankaupunginselkä in Helsinki. One of the tributaries of Vantaanjoki is Keravanjoki that flows through the town of Kerava north of Helsinki.

== Use as water and power supply ==
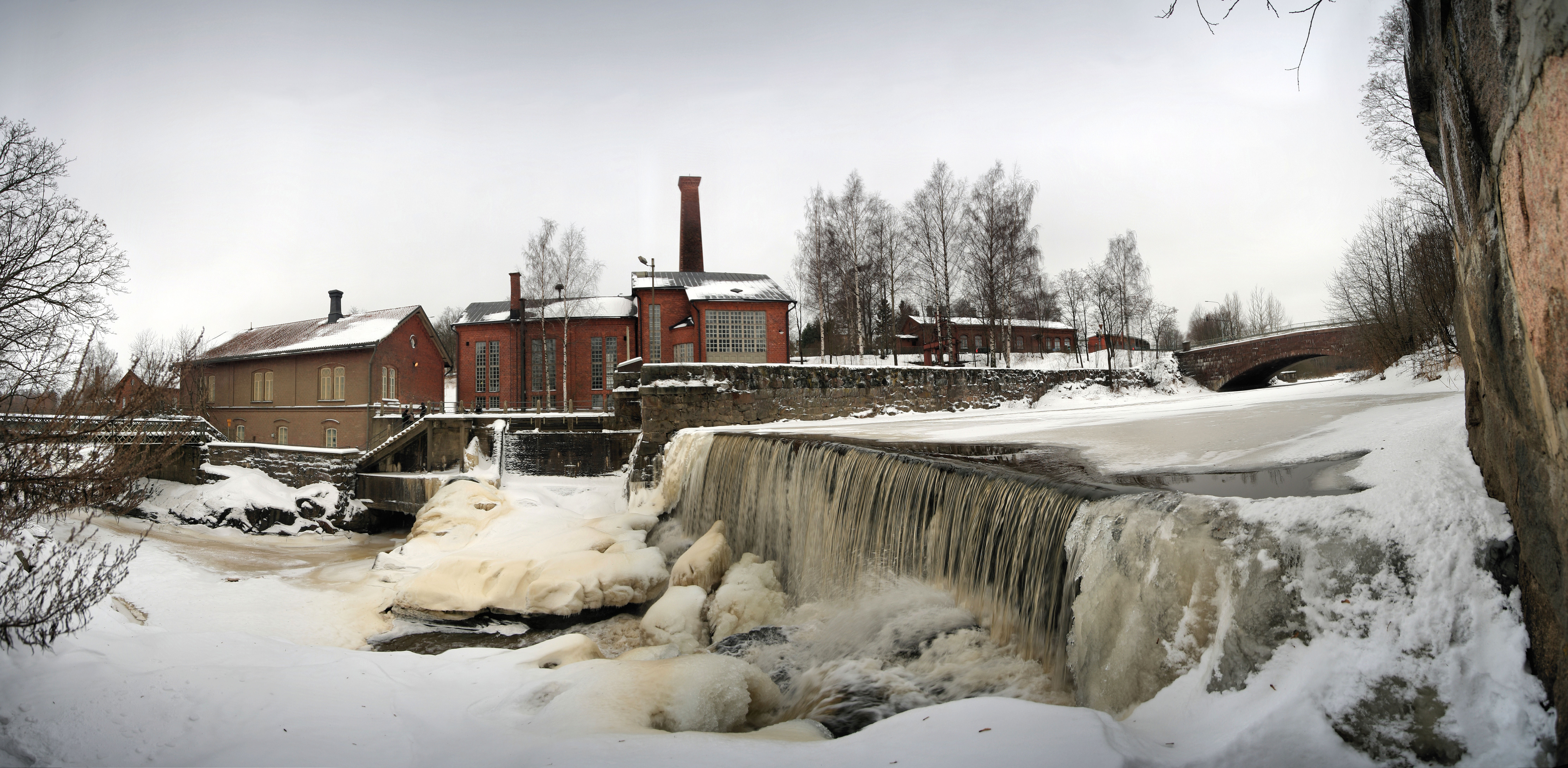
A weir on the Vantaa and a small hydro-electric power station by Kuninkaankartanonsaari island in Vanhakaupunki

The country's capital, Helsinki, uses water from Vantaanjoki as its backup water supply if the Päijänne Water Tunnel needs to be repaired.

The Helsinki-based energy company Helsingin Energia has a working power station museum located at the mouth of Vantaanjoki. The Vanhakaupunki Hydropower Plant produces an average of 500 MWh annually.

== Gallery ==
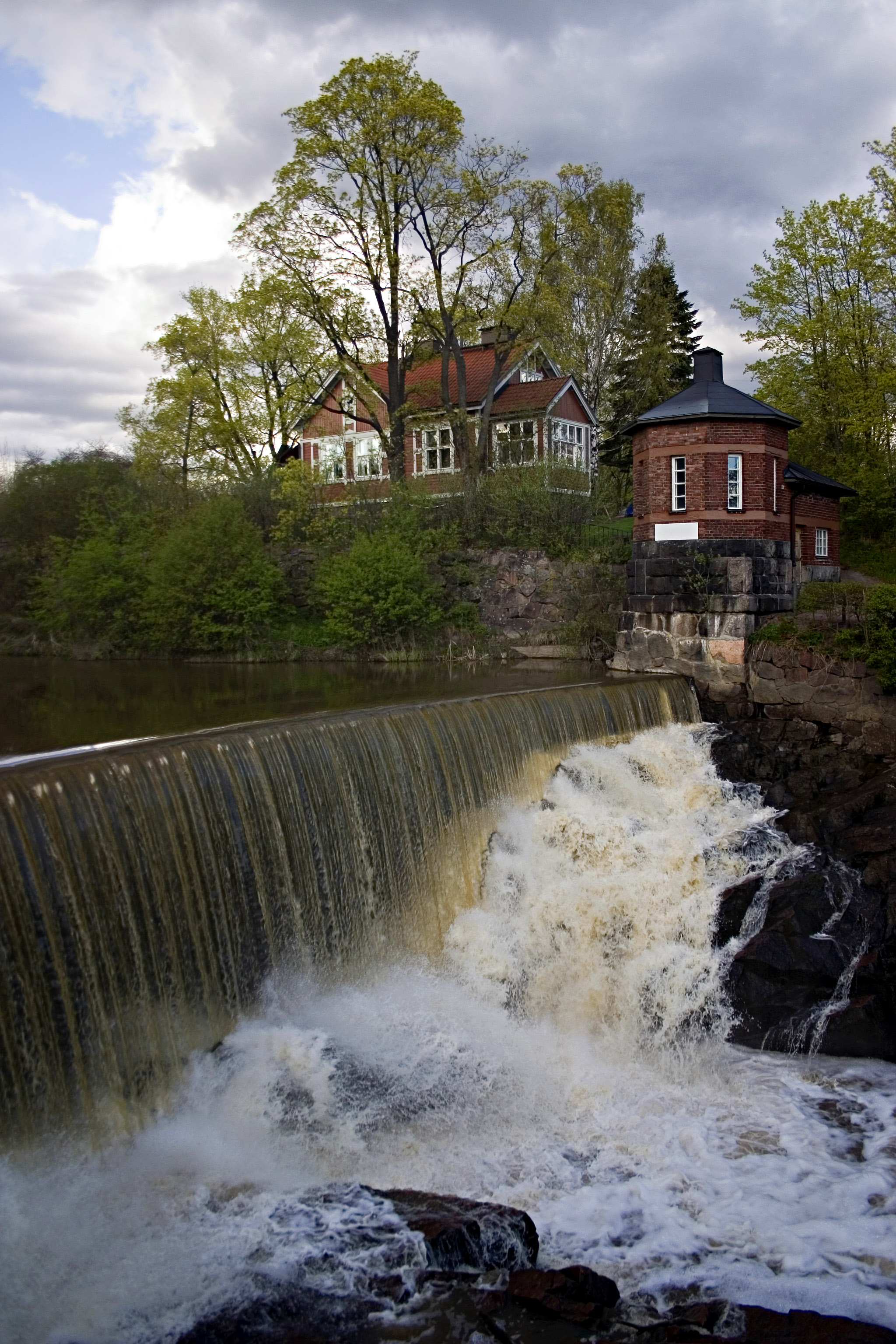
Vanhankaupunginkoski rapids

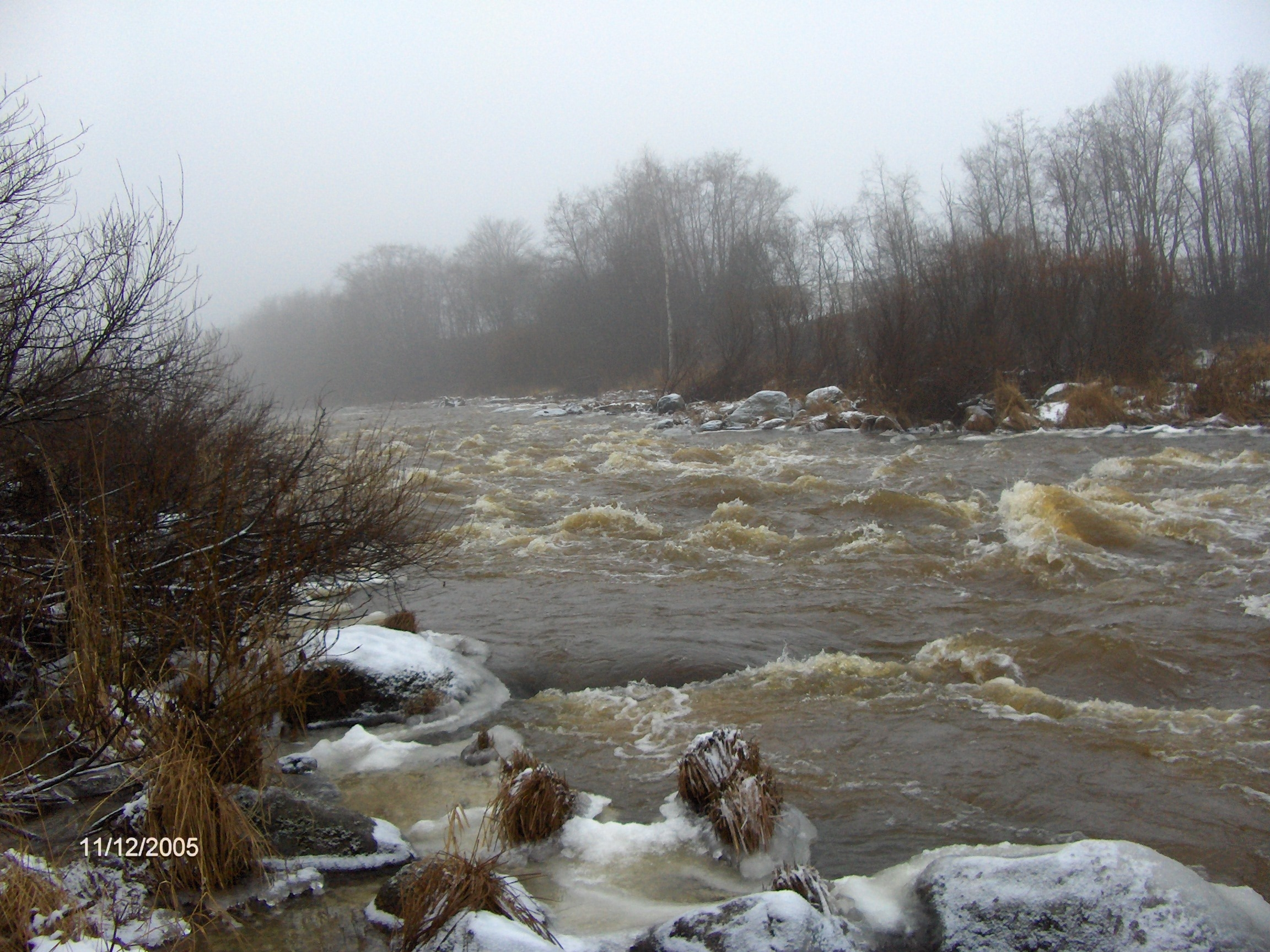
Ruutinkoski rapids

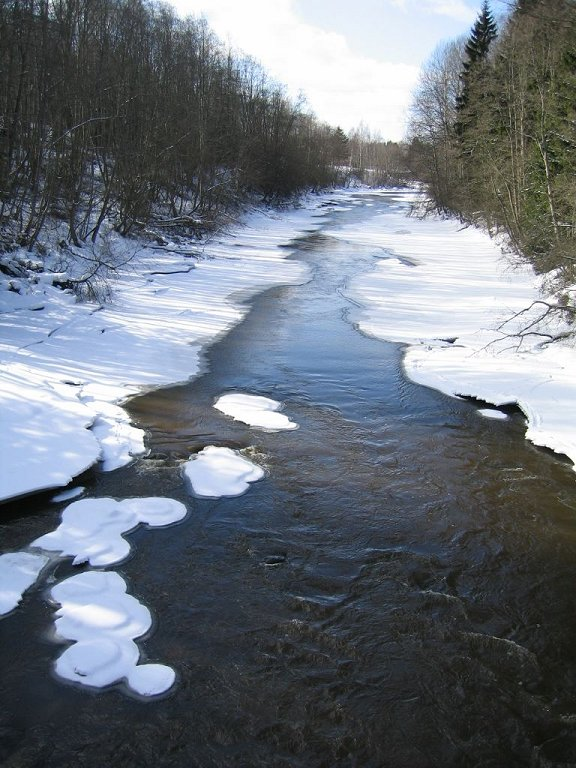
Pitkäkoski rapids during winter, located between Helsinki and Vantaa

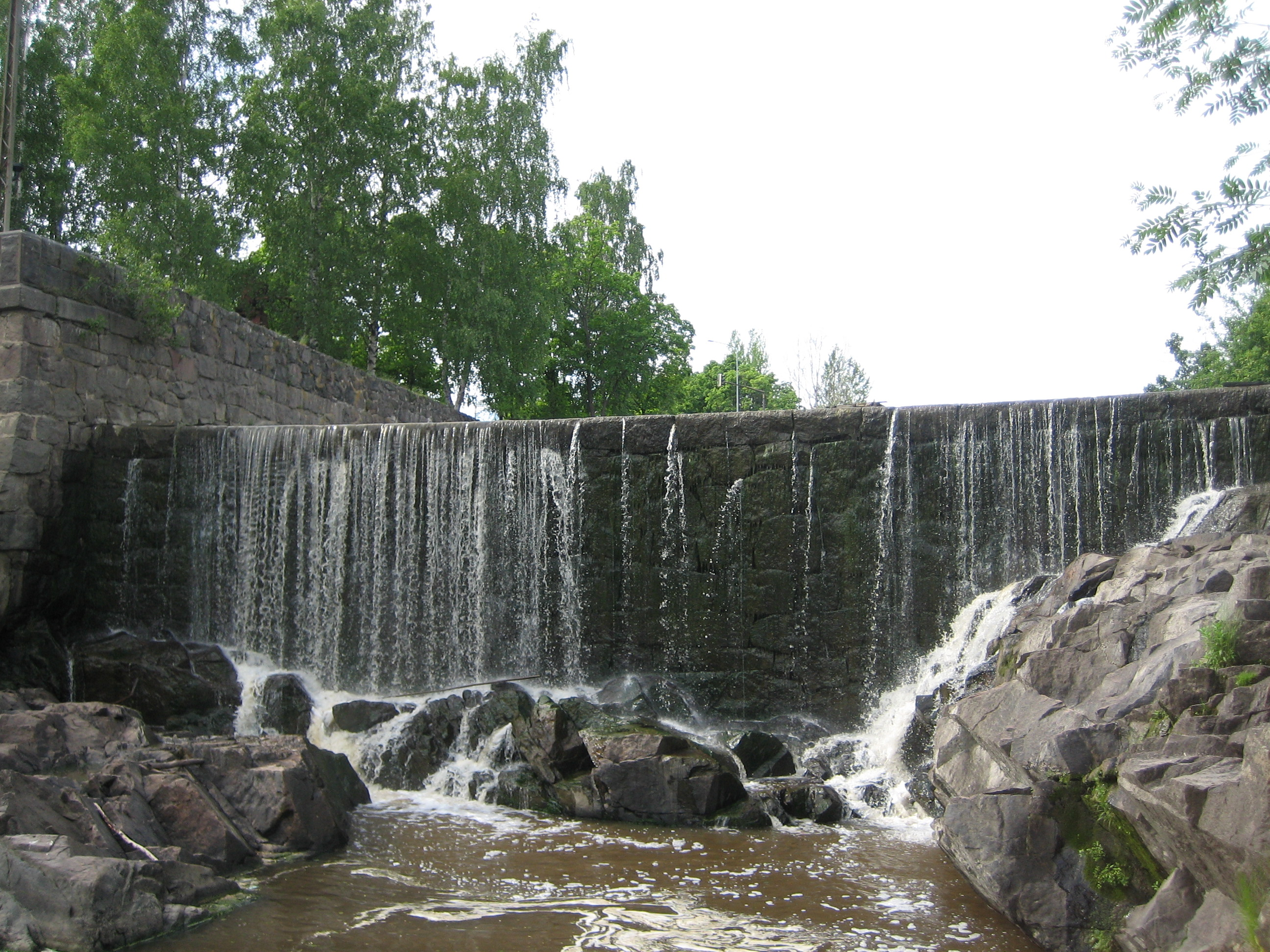
A dam in Vantaanjoki

== See also ==
- Kaljakellunta, an annual social event on the river
- Kerava River
- Kuhakoski
