= Päijänne Water Tunnel =

Water tunnel in Southern Finland

Coordinates: 60.277778°N 24.894444°E

Map of the Päijänne Water Tunnel.: 1. Asikkalanselkä; 2. Kalliomäki water distribution station; 3. Korpimäki water pump station; 4. Artificial lake of Silvola

The Päijänne Water Tunnel (Finnish: Päijännetunneli, Swedish: Päijännetunneln) is a water tunnel located in Southern Finland. At 120 kilometers (75 mi), it is the second-longest tunnel in the world, running at a depth of 30–100 metres (100–330 ft) in the bedrock.

The purpose of the tunnel is to provide fresh water for the over one million people of the Greater Helsinki area, including the cities of Helsinki, Espoo, Vantaa, Hyvinkää, Järvenpää, Kerava, Kauniainen, Kirkkonummi, Sipoo and Tuusula. The former Porvoo Rural Municipality, now merged with the municipality of Porvoo, also took part in the building of the scheme but has never drawn water from it for domestic use.

The tunnel starts at Asikkalanselkä in Lake Päijänne, the second-largest lake in Finland with an area of 1,080 square kilometres (420 sq mi). From there, the tunnel slopes slightly downhill allowing water to flow naturally with gravity. Water from the southern portion of Lake Päijänne is of good quality at the tunnel intake, and usually drinkable without processing. The tunnel ends at the 0.5 square kilometres (0.19 sq mi) Silvola reservoir in Vantaa. From the reservoir, water is pumped to water treatment plants in Pitkäkoski and Vanhakaupunki. Since the constant low temperature in the deep tunnel ensures high quality during transport, only minimal processing is required before use.

The construction of the tunnel started in 1972 and was completed in 1982, at a cost of approximately €200 million (adjusted for inflation). In 1999 and 2001, portions of the tunnel required repair due to rock falls. In 2008, the tunnel underwent an extensive renovation. The southern part of the tunnel was reinforced in order to prevent cave-ins. During the renovation, the Vantaa River was used as an alternative water supply for the Greater Helsinki area.

The tunnel has a cross section of 16 square metres (170 sq ft), wide enough for a truck to pass through, enabling a water flow of 10 cubic metres (350 cu ft) per second. It takes approximately nine days for the water to traverse the length of the tunnel. At current water usage rates, treatment plants take water at a rate of about 3.1 cubic metres (110 cu ft) per second for drinking water processing. The tunnel can be used as an emergency water reserve during water supply disruption.

== Gallery ==
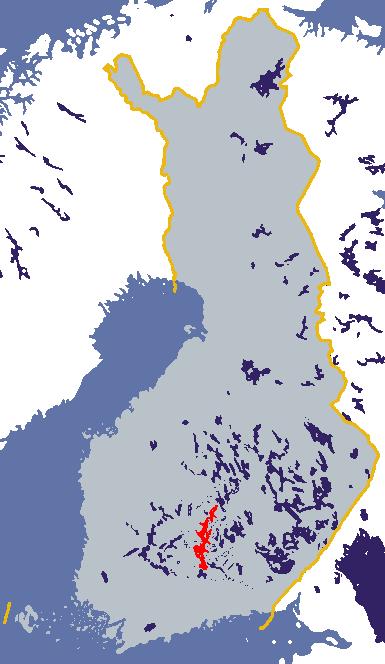
Location of Lake Päijänne in Finland.

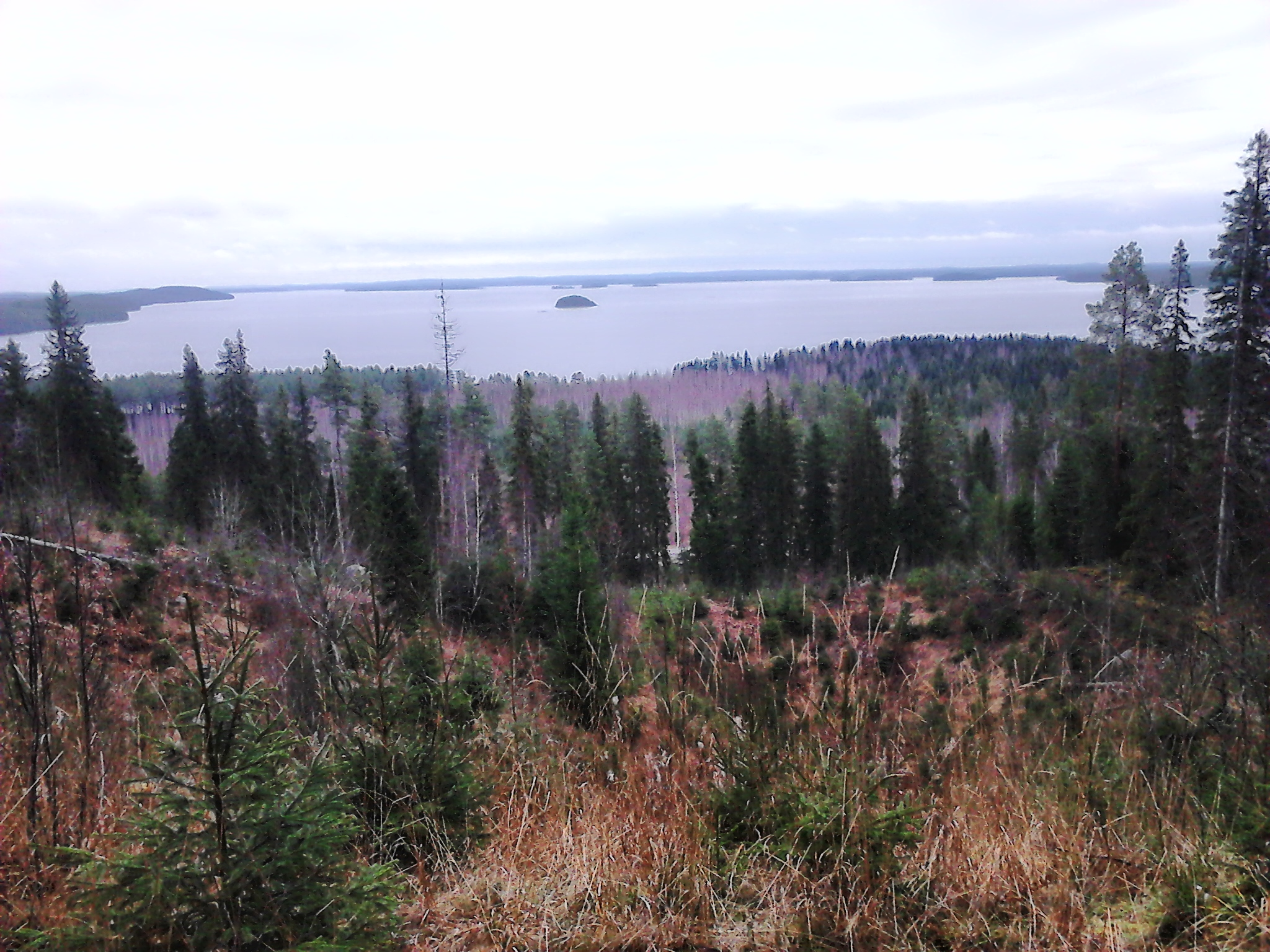
Asikkalanselkä in Lake Päijänne, where the tunnel starts.

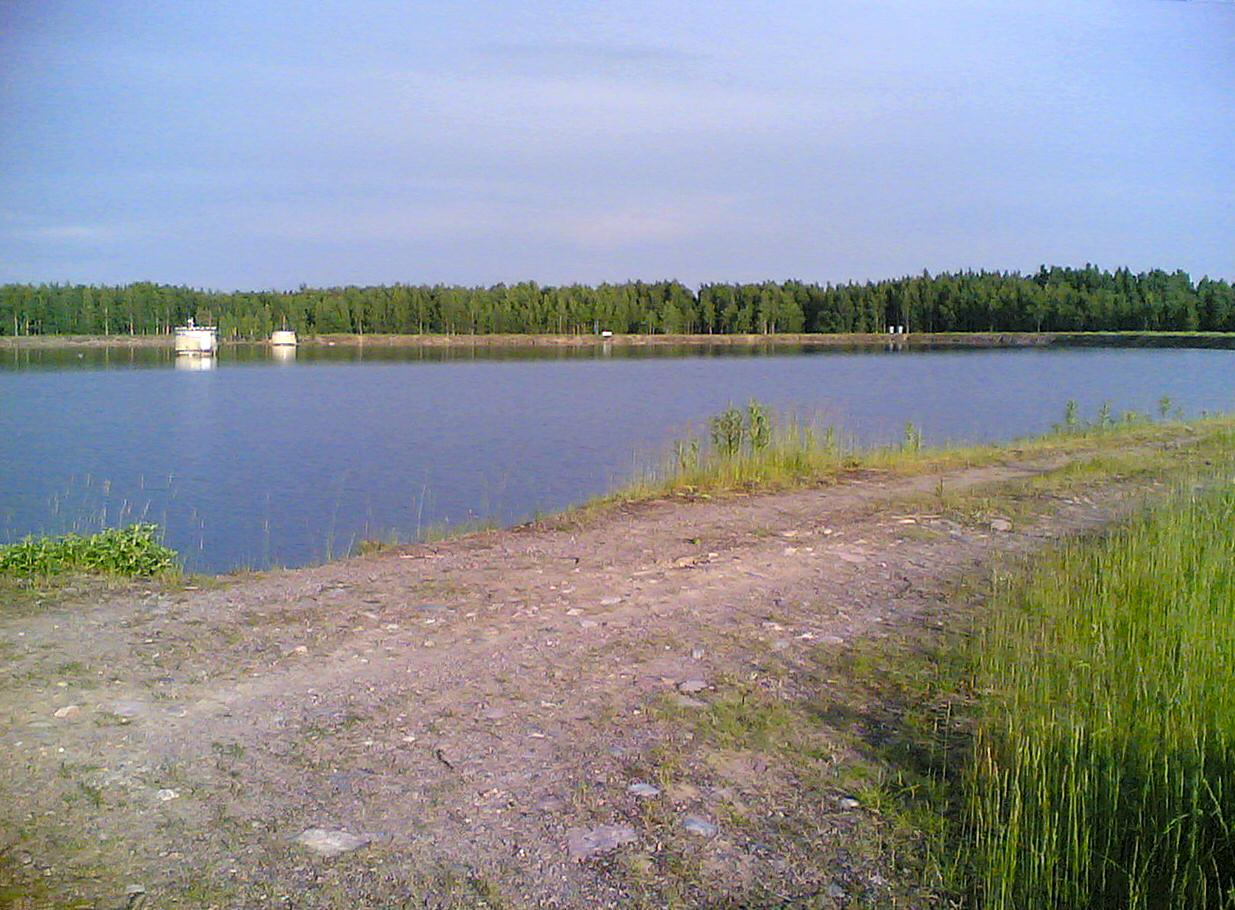
Silvola reservoir, where the tunnel ends.

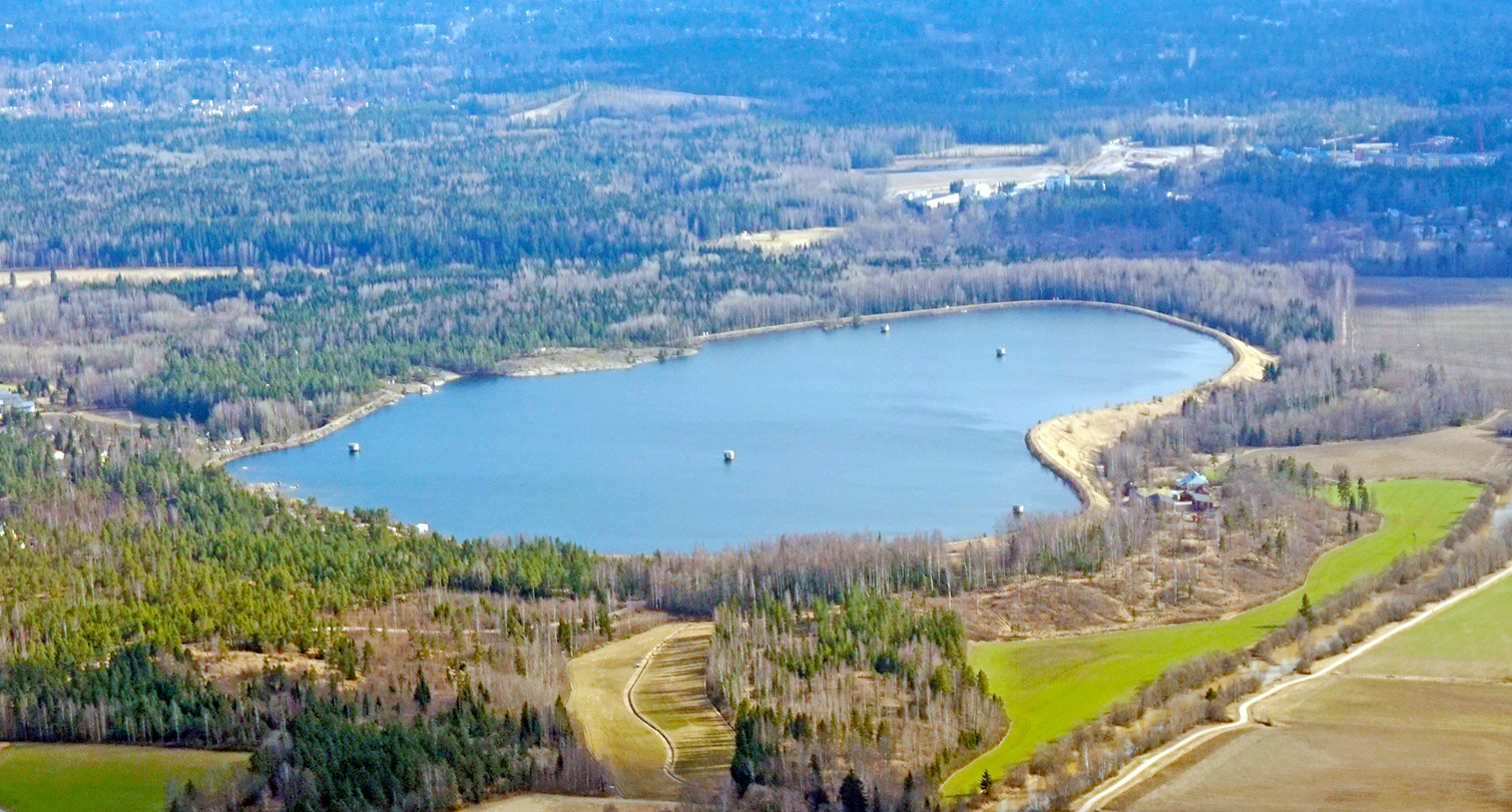
Aerial view of Silvola reservoir.

== See also ==
- List of longest tunnels
