= Korso =

- City District
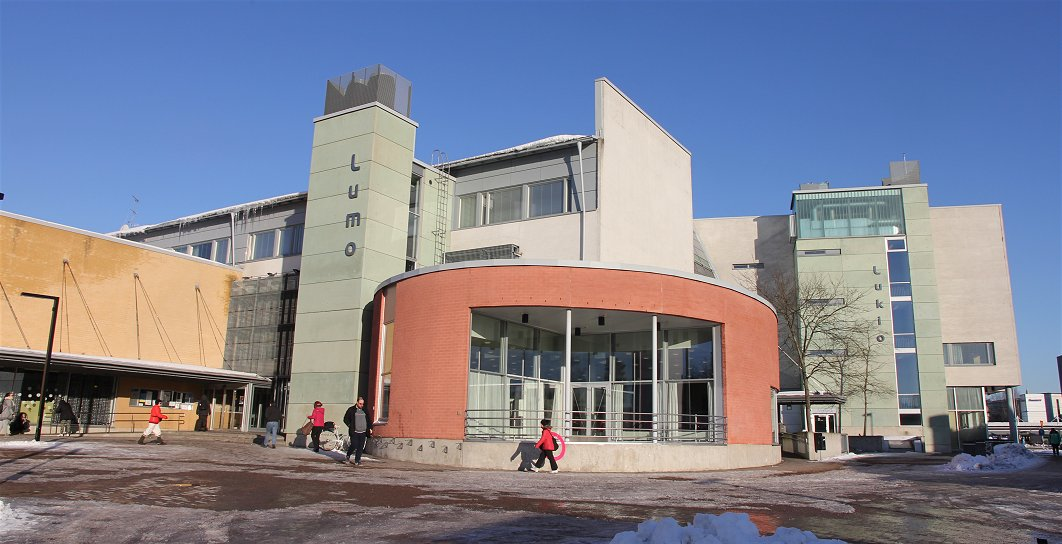
- The Lumo High School in Korso

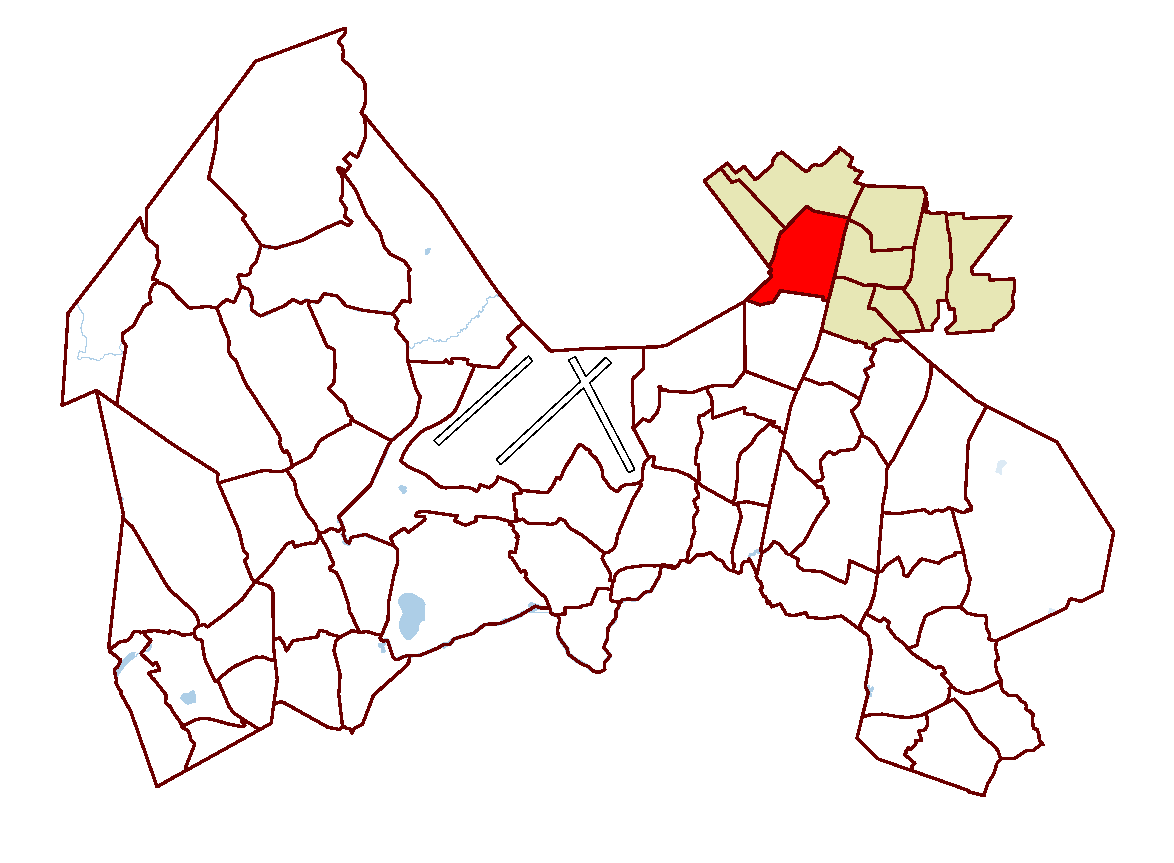
- Location on the map of Vantaa, with the district in red and the major region in light brown
- Coordinates: 60°21′03″N 25°04′40″E
- Country: Finland
- City: Vantaa
- Major region: Greater Helsinki

Area
  - Total: 3.0 km^{2} (1.2 sq mi)
  - Major region: 19.5 km^{2} (7.5 sq mi)

Population (1.1.2014)
  - Total: 7,402
  - Density: 2,500/km^{2} (6,400/sq mi)
  - Major region: 29,765
  - Major region density: 1,530/km^{2} (3,950/sq mi)
- Time zone: GMT +2
- Postal Code(s): 01450, 01451
- Website: www.vantaa.fi/frontpage/

Korso is a district and major region in Helsinki metropolitan area, in northeastern Vantaa, Finland. The district has 7,402 inhabitants (as of 1 January 2014).

Since 2007, the Korso major region has included the following nine districts: Matari, Korso, Mikkola, Metsola, Leppäkorpi, Jokivarsi, Nikinmäki, Vierumäki and Vallinoja. The Korso major region has a total 29,765 inhabitants (as of 1 January 2014).

== Geography ==
Korso is located in the Helsinki metropolitan area, to the west of the main north–south track line of the Finnish railways, some 20 km north from Helsinki city centre. The nearest towns are Kerava, six kilometres to the north, Sipoo in the east, Tuusula in north west and Espoo in the west.

=== Neighbouring areas ===
According to the Vantaa neighbourhood division, Korso is bordered by the railway tracks to the east, by Vallinoja to the north and by Vierumäki to the northwest.

== History and future ==
The name Korso was born when the crossing point of the borders of three villages - Ali-Kerava and Hyrylä in Tuusula as well as Hanaböle in the old parish of Helsinki - was marked by a cross on the highest cliff of Korso (the word "cross" is kors in Swedish and the word "border" is rå; thus the name originally meant "cross border"). There is a memorial plaque about the history of Korso near the Ruusuvuori school.

=== 19th century ===
At the end of the 19th century, an overtake point was needed on the main railway track line halfway between Tikkurila and Kerava. The Korso stop was built in 1889 in nearly uninhabited wilderness at the border of Tuusula and the Helsinki parish - Korso. The train started to stop at Korso twice a day, which provided a starting point for the development of the area. The current disused station building was built in 1938 according to Thure Hellström's class V station plans for the Seinäjoki-Kristinestad-Kaskinen railway track line.

=== 20th century ===
When Kerava was separated from Tuusula as a market town in 1924, the area of the old Ali-Kerava village was included wholly in it. It also included the Korso railway station, whose neighbourhood formed a clearly separate residential point from the centre of the market town. The area grew quickly especially after the wars, and in the 1950s, Korso was the largest connected separate-home-based residential area in Finland. Factories, such as Sokeva owned by the Central Organisation for the Hard of Sight, were also founded in Korso.

The Korso railway station was located very near to the point, called the old Korsrå boundary point, where the boundaries of Helsingin maalaiskunta, Tuusula and Kerava met each other. As this residential area grew, it flowed into both neighbouring municipalities. This caused administrative problems, and because of them Korso was wholly incorporated in Helsingin maalaiskunta in the beginning of the year 1954. At the same time, there was an option to make Korso into a separate municipality. Tuusula and Kerava supported this idea, but Helsingin maalaiskunta opposed it, because the new Korso would also have included Rekola, located in Helsingin maalaiskunta. Since the 1970s, some apartment buildings have also been built in the Korso district in Kulomäki, Mikkola and Vallinoja and around the Korso railway station. Still, Korso remains mainly a separate-home-based area.

=== 21st century ===
In the current millennium, a multi-use house Lumo has been built in the district. The railway station and the parish centre have also been renewed. The student housing buildings built in the area serve as homes to many students in the Helsinki capital area. The building of the Maarukanmetsä residential area started in the early 2000s in the southeastern part of Mikkola and continues to be built to this day.

=== Future plans ===
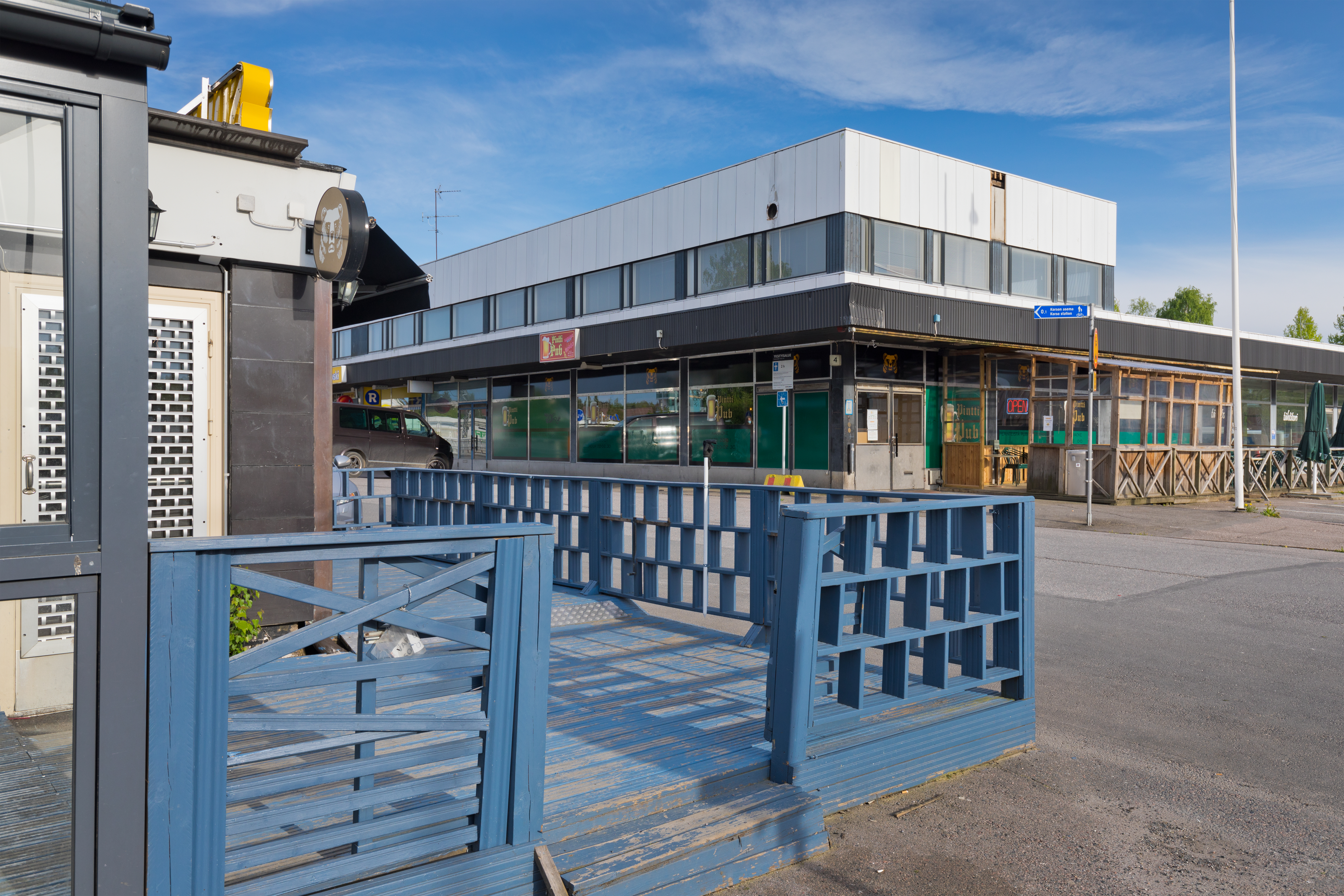
1960s retail buildings near the railway station.

- A Korso-Koivukylä sports park Elmo to be built between Kulomäki and Rekolanmäki.
- More apartments, services and jobs are planned in the centre of Korso. Construction of new apartment buildings in underway in the center, including an 18-story apartment building.
- Kehä IV, plans to widen the Kulomäentie road (regional road 152) to have 2+2 lanes.

== Services ==
There is a post office near the Korso railway station to the east of the railway tracks, as well as Korso's social and health centre, which has a KELA service point. Also to the east of the railway tracks are a child care station and the Korso-Rekola psychiatric policlinic and a Christian parish of Korso. To the west of the railway tracks is the multi-use house Lumo, which has a common service point, a library, a sports hall as well the Lumon lukio school and the Lumo hall. Korso's dental care station and the Korson koulu school are also located to the west of the railway tracks.

== Traffic connections ==
The Finnish national road 45, also known as the Tuusula highway, runs roughly five kilometres to the west of Korso, and the national road 4 (E75), also known as the Lahti highway, runs to the east of Korso. Both have a connection to the regional road 152, also known as Kulomäentie, which runs very close to the south of the centre of Korso. As well as them, there are connections along the railway tracks to Tikkurila (to the south) and Kerava (to the north).

The Helsinki Airport is located roughly 9 kilometres to the southwest.

== Public transport ==
Korso belongs to the Helsingin Seudun Liikenne (HSL) regional ticket zone, served by regional buses, communal trains and the Helsinki Metro. A regional ticket allows journeys in Helsinki, Espoo, Kauniainen and Vantaa. A passenger travelling with a single ticket has the right to transfer inside the regional ticket zone for 80 minutes.

=== Communal trains ===
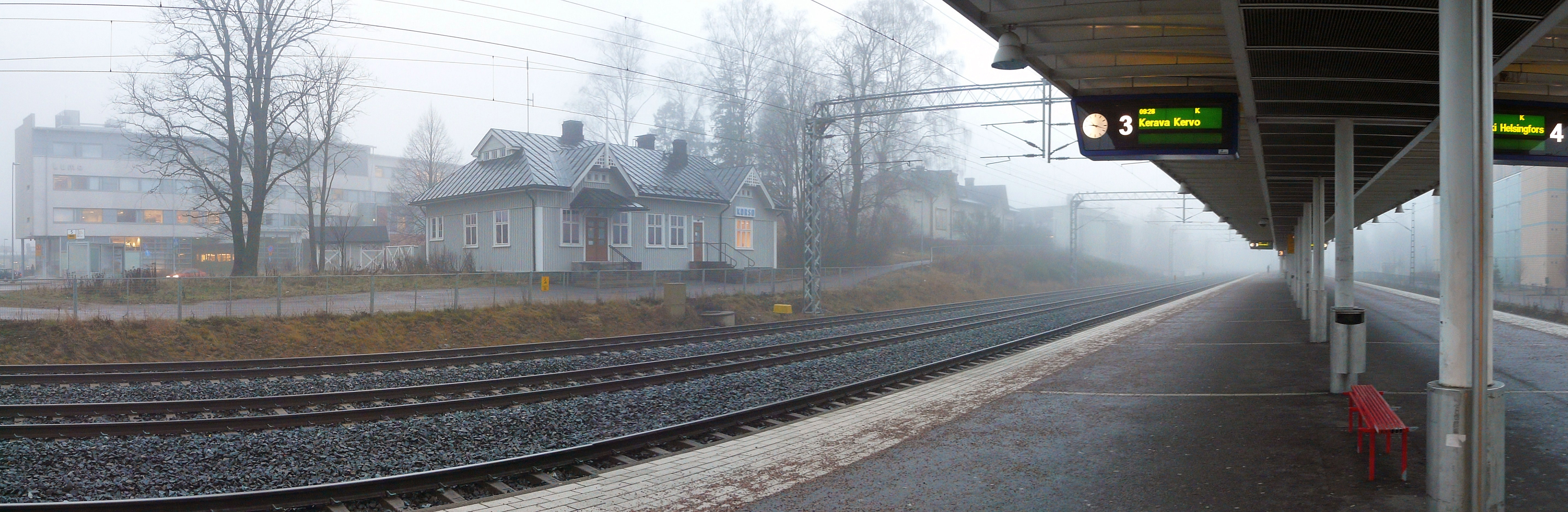
A platform at the Korso railway station in November 2009.

The K train runs from Korso railway station to Helsinki central railway station and to Kerava railway station. During nighttime hours, the station is served by T trains to Helsinki and Riihimäki.

=== Buses ===
There are several bus lines from Korso to Helsinki. It also has bus connections via the Peijas hospital to Mellunmäki, Tikkurila, Kerava, southern Päiväkumpu, Hyrylä, Myyrmäki and the Helsinki Airport.

The Korso express bus stop serves bus connections between Lahti and the Helsinki Airport, as well as long-distance express connections between Rovaniemi and Helsinki.

=== Connecting parking ===
The Korso railway station parking hall and its environment have 390 parking spaces for cars. There are also roughly 155 parking spaces for bicycles.

== Sports and recreation ==
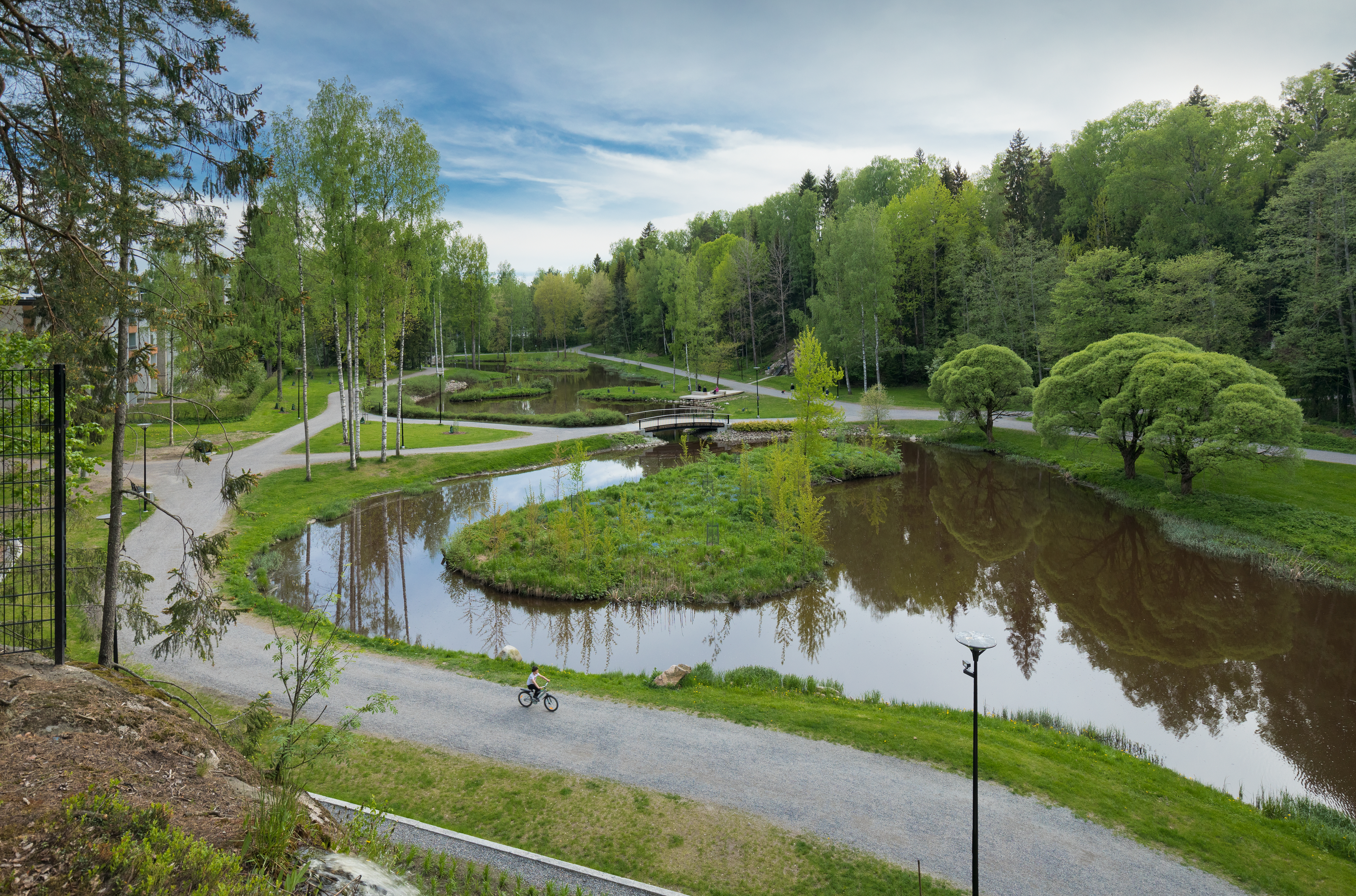
The central park also known as Ankkapuisto.

=== Places for outdoor recreation ===
- Korso central park (Ankkalampi)
- Korso outdoor swimming pool, Leppäkorpi
- Metsolansuo hiking trail and ski trail

=== Places for sports ===
- Kalmuuri
- Korso swimming pool
- Korso sports hall

=== Sport clubs ===
- Korson Kaiku
- Korson Kunto
- Korson Palloseura
- Korson Veto
- Greasers FBC
- HC Korso
- Legal Eyeball
- Orient United
- FC Legirus Inter

=== Scouting organisations ===
- Korson Honkaveljet
- Kaarnapartio

== Voluntary services ==
- Korson VPK

== Organisations ==
- Korso-seura
- Korso-Koivukylän Linkki
- Korson Martat
- Mannerheim child care association
- Nuoret Kotkat
- The Red Cross
- Korso unemployed association

== Events ==
- Country market in April and September
- Korso Veto market in May
- Korso Cup tournament in September
- Korso Christmas hiking trail in the Ankkalampi park in December

== See also ==
- Kerava
- Nikkilä
- Tikkurila

== Sources ==
- Vantaa alueittain (2003), pp. 185–187 and 212–215.
- Vantaan väestö kaupunginosittain 1.1.2006
- Valtakunnallisesti merkittävät rakennetut kulttuuriympäristöt RKY
