= Markku Andersson =

Finnish politician

Markku Andersson (born 27 March 1950) is a Finnish politician, who was the city manager of Jyväskylä from 2004 to 2015. He was born in Tampere.

Andersson matriculated in 1969 in Tampere and studied community sciences and education sciences at the University of Jyväskylä in the 1970s. He graduated as a Master of Community Sciences in 1975, and as a Master of Education Sciences in 1978. He worked at the University of Jyväskylä from 1975 to 1983, as the city secretary of Pori from 1983 to 1988 and as the municipal manager of Tuusula from 1989 to 1993, as well as the city manager of Lappeenranta from 1993 to 2004 before becoming the city manager of Jyväskylä on 27 September 2004.

Andersson was a member of the city council of Jyväskylä from 1977 to 1983 and a member of the city board from 1981 to 1983. During his studies, he also had several positions in the students' union.

Andersson is a member of the National Coalition Party.
