= Tuusulan kirkonkylä =

Tuusulan kirkonkylä Swedish: Tusby kyrkoby
- Village
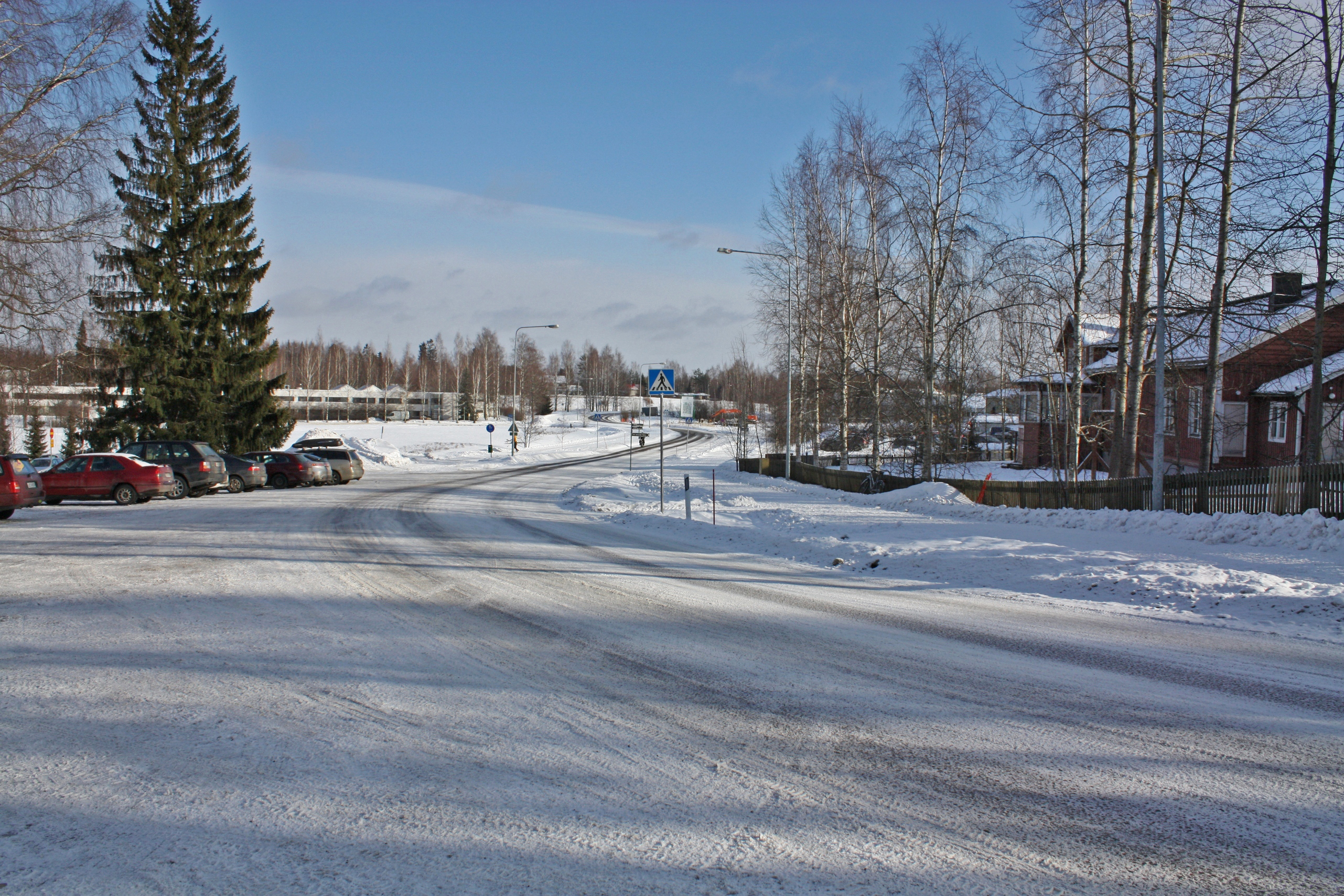
- A village along the Kirkkotie road.

- Location in Finland Tuusulan kirkonkylä (Finland)
- Coordinates: 60°24′44.23″N 25°03′15.27″E
- Country: Finland
- Region: Uusimaa
- Municipality: Tuusula
- Time zone: UTC+2 (EET)
  - Summer (DST): UTC+3 (EEST)
- Postal code: 04310

Tuusulan kirkonkylä (Swedish: Tusby kyrkoby; both lit. 'Tuusula church village') is a rural village in the Tuusula municipality in Uusimaa, Finland.

== Description ==
The earliest mentions of the settlement date back to 1543, when there were no less than ten houses in the village. Tuusula's first church was built in the village in 1643, just 11 years before an independent parish was founded in Tuusula.

The village probably got its name from its original inhabitants known as the Tuusas (based on the Germanic names Dose or Duse), who centuries ago (perhaps in the 13th century) settled on the shores of Lake Tuusula. When the Tuusas came to the area, they were not greeted by a completely nameless landscape, because the lake already had a name at that time, which it had received from wilderness visitors who traveled in the area; it was called Kaukajärvi due to its shape (kauka means "long" in the Finnish language), but was later replaced by name Tuusulanjärvi after the village.

The village is known as the historical parish centre of the municipality before a new municipal centre was moved into Hyrylä. The village is home to, among other things, the Tuusula Church built in 1734, the village's primary school, and the Krapi Farm, which is now used as accommodation.

== See also ==
- Järvenpää
- Kerava
- Lake Tuusula
