= Korson koulu =

Primary school in Vantaa, Finland

Coordinates: 60.3580°N 25.0689°E

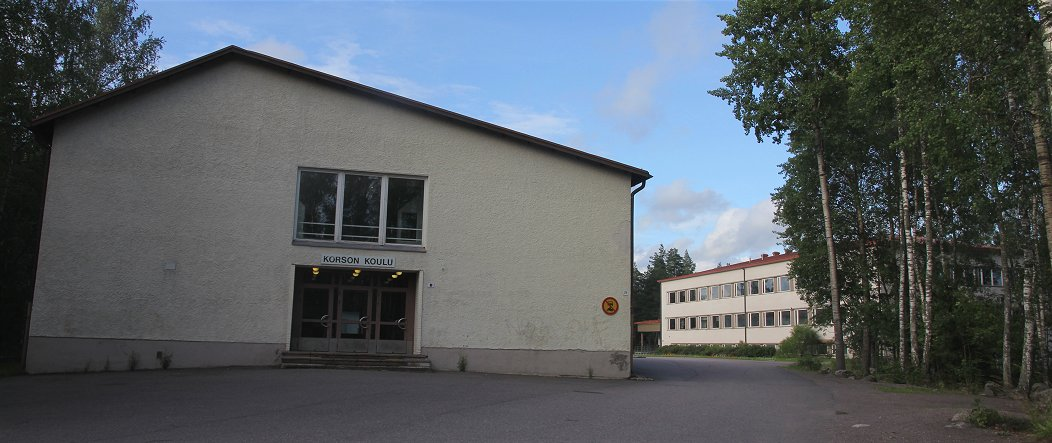
A picture of the school grounds.

Korson koulu is a former primary school and high school, now just a primary school in Korso, Vantaa, Finland. The school has two buildings on Kisatie 29. It is attended by circa 520 students and has grades from sixth to ninth.

Korson koulu was founded in 1957. Its elder building was completed in 1959. Korson koulu was initially a comprehensive school but was split into a primary school (Korson koulu) and an upper secondary school (Korson lukio) in 1977. Since 1999 Timo Rönnqvist has been the principal of Korson koulu. In 2003 Korson lukio moved to a new building and was renamed Lumon lukio - the buildings on Kisatie have since been operated by Korson koulu alone. In 2015 City of Vantaa announced a plan to abolish Korson koulu by 2021 due to its problems with air quality and long school travels for students.
