= For Tuusula =

For Tuusula (in Finnish: Tuusulan puolesta ry.) is a local political party in the municipality of Tuusula, Finland. In the 2004 municipal elections the party got 3789 votes (25.2%). It got 14 seats in the municipal council.
