= Hyrylä =

Village in Tuusula, Finland

Coordinates: 60.4006°N 25.0216°E

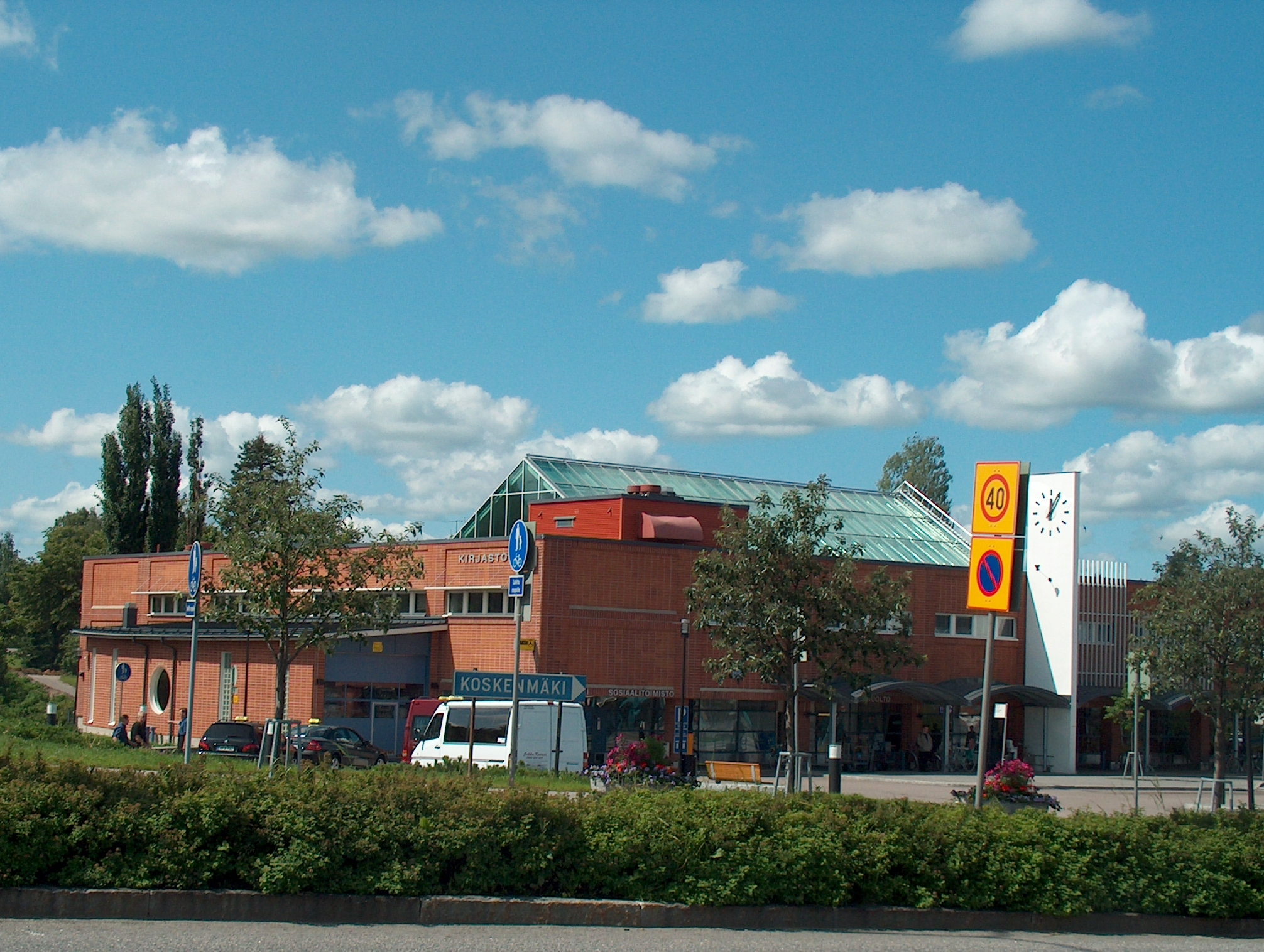
Library of Hyrylä

Hyrylä (Swedish: Skavaböle, also Hyrylä) is one of the three villages and the administrative centre of Tuusula, with a population of about 19,500 residents.

It is located at the southern side of Lake Tuusula, approximately 10 minutes driving distance from Helsinki-Vantaa Airport and 25 kilometres away from Helsinki. Tuusulanväylä is the most direct main road connection from Hyrylä to the capital. Other important road connections are the regional road 139 leading to the Nurmijärvi's village center of the municipality by the same name, the regional road 145 leading to the town center of Järvenpää and the regional road 148 leading to the town center of Kerava.

== See also ==
- Jokela
- Järvenpää
- Kellokoski
- Tuusula Church Village
