= Finnish national road 45 =

Road in Uusimaa region, Finland

Highway 45
- Kantatie 45 (Finnish); Stamväg 45 (Swedish)
- Tuusulanväylä, Hämeentie
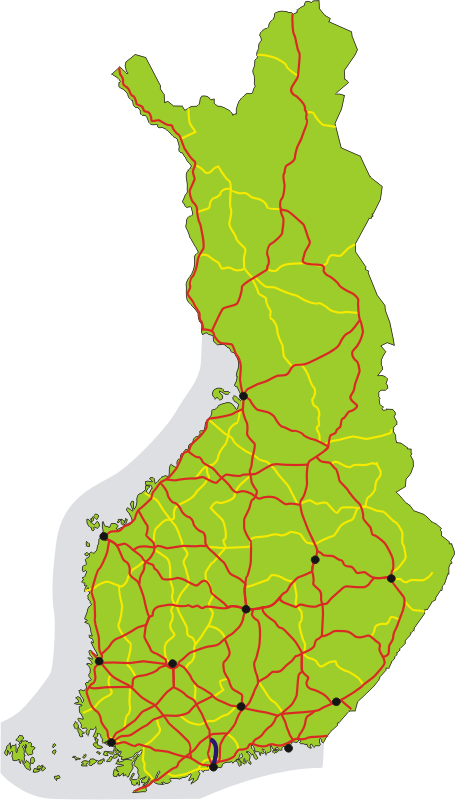

Route information
- Maintained by the Finnish Transport Agency
- Length: 51 km (32 mi)
- Existed: 1996–present

Major junctions
- From: Helsinki
- To: Hyvinkää

Location
- Country: Finland
- Major cities: Vantaa

Highway system
- Highways in Finland
← Kt 44	→ Kt 46

The Finnish national road 45 (Finnish: Kantatie 45; Swedish: Stamväg 45) is the 2nd class main route between the major cities of Helsinki and Hyvinkää in southern Finland. It runs from Käpylä in Helsinki to Hyrylä in Tuusula as a motorway called Tuusula Highway (Finnish: Tuusulanväylä, Swedish: Tusbyleden), where it continues to the edge of Hyvinkää and national road 3 as a smaller road called Hämeentie.

== History ==
In the 1938 road numbering system, the route was part of national road 4 and national road 5, which ran from Helsinki to Hyrylä. From Hyrylä, the dual carriageway continued along the current main road 45 to Hyvinkää. In the late 1950s, national road 5 was rerouted east, and the dual carriageway was also rerouted to run through Lahti. At that time, the road between Helsinki and Hyrylä remained a country road and was given the number 137. The first motorway section from Käpylä to the north of Ring Road III was built in 1964–1967 mostly on the old road by widening it. The motorway was partly extended as a mixed-traffic road towards Tuusula in 1992. The opening of the motorway was celebrated in Tuusula on 11 November 1993. The old route remained as a side road. Improvements to the Ring I interchange were completed in 1999 and those of Ring III in 2005.

In the 1996 renumbering, former national road 137 was changed to a main road, and was given the number 45. This number was previously used for the Tampere ring road, but this was renumbered to main road 60 (now part of national roads 3 and 9) in the 1996 renumbering. At the same time, the name of the entire motorway section was changed to Tuusulanväylä, while before 1996 it had been known as Tuusulantie in the Helsinki area.

== Route ==
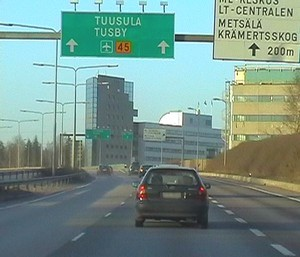
A view of the motorway from Helsinki to Tuusula.

The road passes through the following localities:

- Helsinki (Käpylä and Pakila)
- Vantaa (Tammisto, Koivuhaka and Ruskeasanta)
- Tuusula (Ruotsinkylä, Hyrylä and Rusutjärvi)
- Nurmijärvi (Nukari)
- Hyvinkää
