= Keravanjoki =

River in Southern Finland

Coordinates: 60°17′N 24°59′E

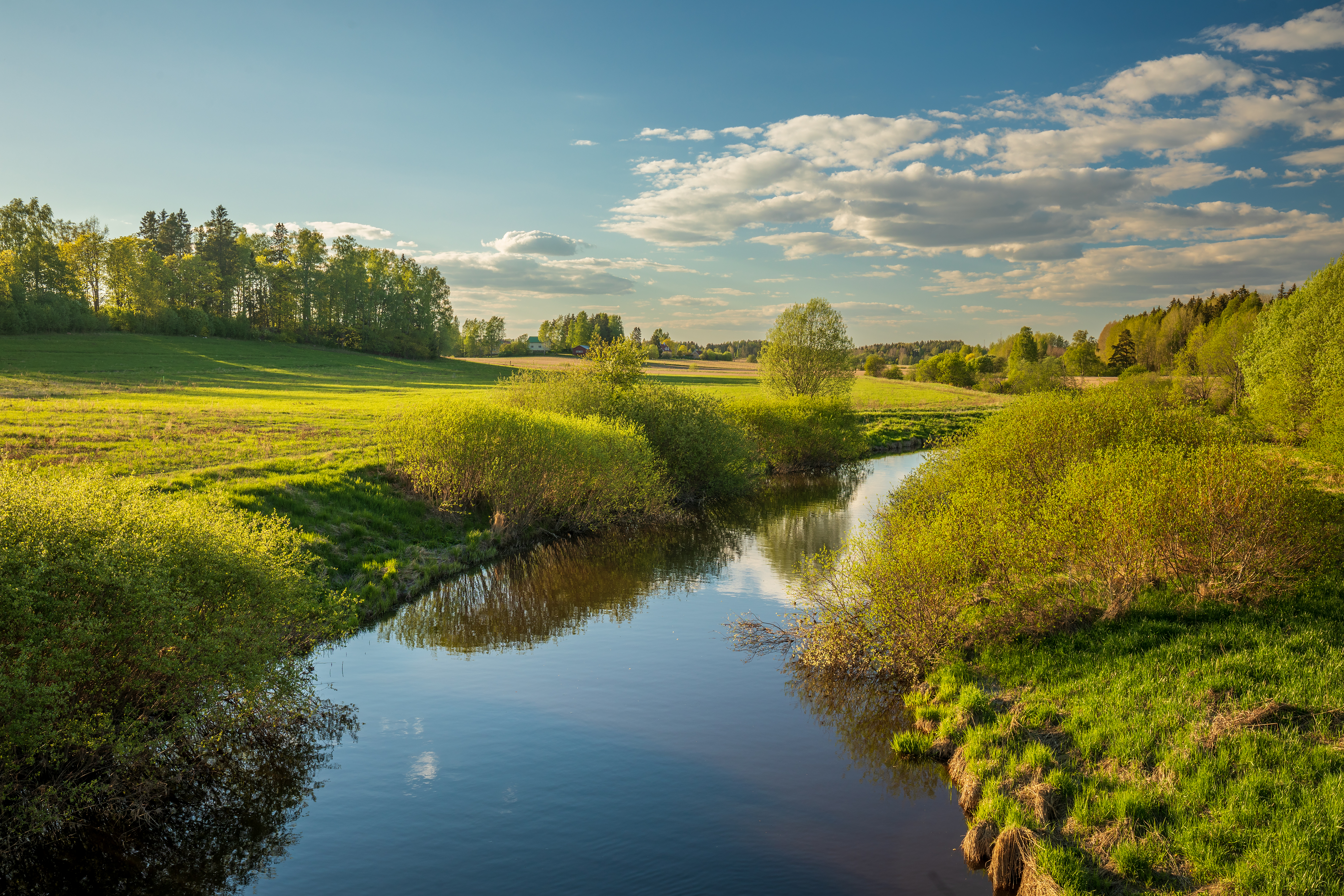
- Keravanjoki river as seen from Kerava stone bridge between Ylikerava and Kaskela, Kerava, Finland in 2022 May

Location
- Country: Finland

Physical characteristics
- Source: Lake Ridasjärvi
  - location: Hyvinkää
- Mouth: Gulf of Finland
  - location: Vanhankaupunginselkä, Helsinki

The Keravanjoki (Swedish: Kervo å; the Kerava River) is a river in Finland. The 65-kilometer-long river starts from Lake Ridasjärvi in Hyvinkää. The Keravanjoki is a tributary of the Vantaa River that flows into the Gulf of Finland at Helsinki. As the name implies, the river runs through the town of Kerava.

== See also ==
- Kaljakellunta, an annual social event on the river
- List of rivers of Finland
