= Beer floating =

Summer event in Finland

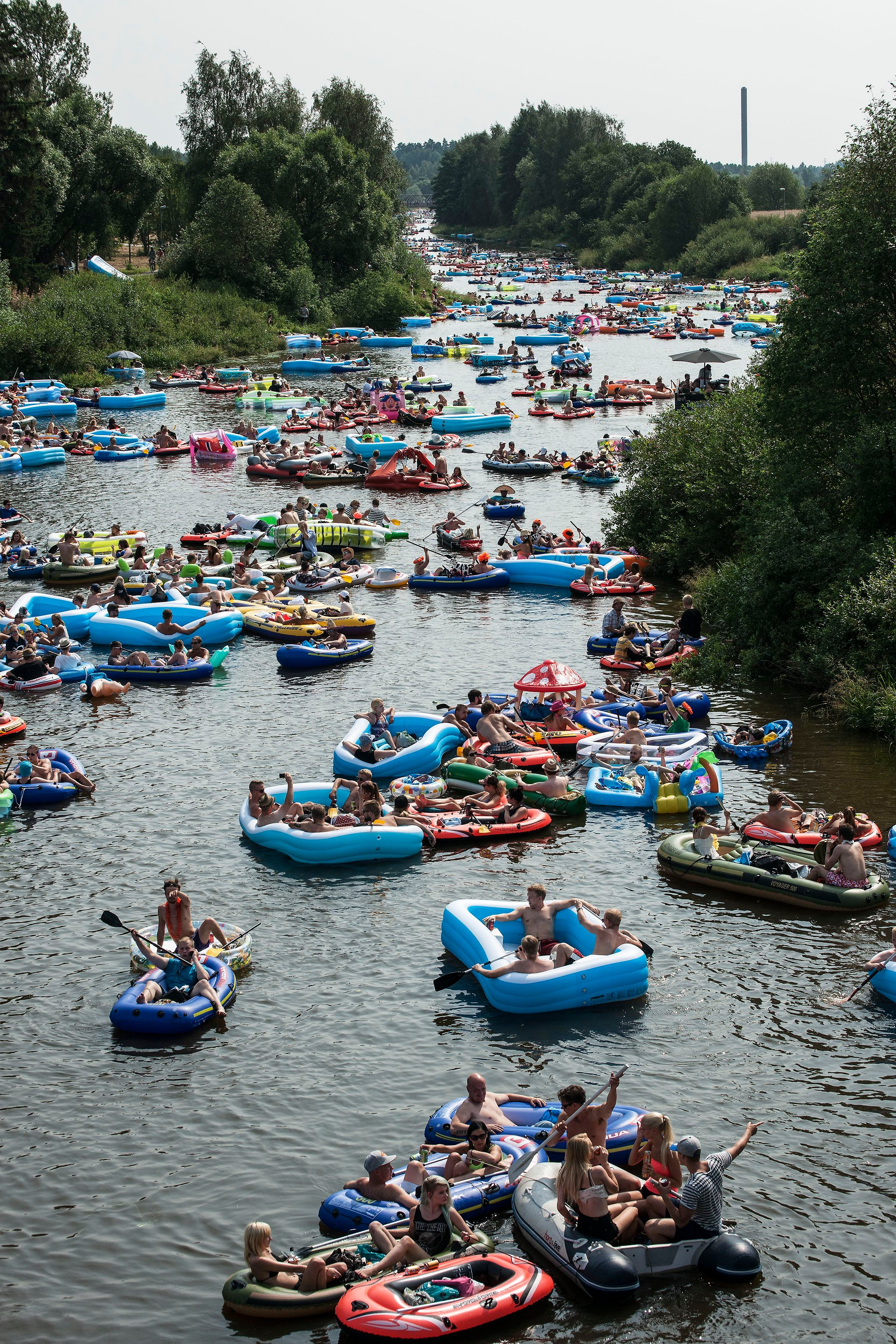
Beer floating in Vantaa in 2014

Beer floating (Finnish: Kaljakellunta) is an open and unofficial Finnish summer event.

== Event ==
In the event, the participants float on the Kerava River or Vantaa River from Vantaa to a downstream riverside beach in Helsinki. The participants use small inflatable rubber crafts, usually equipped with only a paddle and plenty of beer. The event has no official organizers but instead the date is decided on online social forums such as Facebook. The date is usually in late July or early August.

The beer floating event has been organized annually since 1997. There were fewer than ten participants in the first event, the numbers have grown every year: in 2011, around 5,000 people participated in the event.

A similar event is also organized in Oulu, with participants floating on the Oulu River.
