= Tuusula =

Municipality in Uusimaa, Finland

Tuusula Tusby
- Municipality
- Tuusulan kunta Tusby kommun
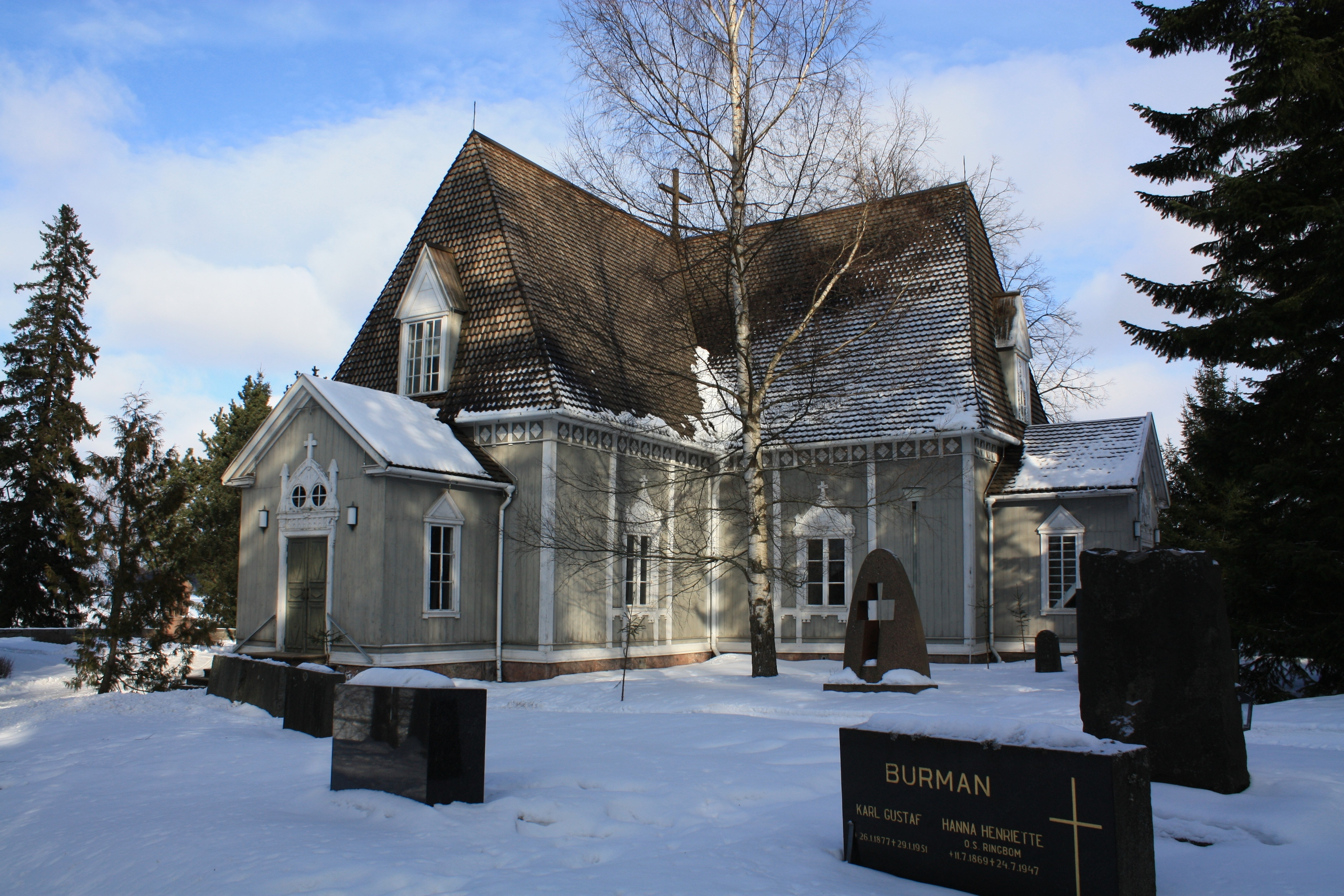
- The wooden church of Tuusula

- Coat of arms

- Location of Tuusula in Finland
- Interactive map of Tuusula
- Coordinates: 60°24′N 025°02′E
- Country: Finland
- Region: Uusimaa
- Sub-region: Helsinki sub-region
- Metropolitan area: Helsinki metropolitan area
- Founded: 1643
- Seat: Hyrylä
- Villages: Jokela, Kellokoski

Government
  - Municipal manager: Hannu Joensivu

Area (2018-01-01)
  - Total: 225.45 km^{2} (87.05 sq mi)
  - Land: 219.53 km^{2} (84.76 sq mi)
  - Water: 5.95 km^{2} (2.30 sq mi)
  - Rank: 254th largest in Finland
- Elevation: 63 m (207 ft)

Population (2025-12-31)
  - Total: 42,479
  - Rank: 27th largest in Finland
  - Density: 193.5/km^{2} (501/sq mi)

Population by native language
  - Finnish: 89.8% (official)
  - Swedish: 1.4%
  - Others: 8.8%

Population by age
  - 0 to 14: 18.1%
  - 15 to 64: 63.3%
  - 65 or older: 18.6%
- Time zone: UTC+02:00 (EET)
  - Summer (DST): UTC+03:00 (EEST)
- Postal code: 04301
- Climate: Dfb
- Website: www.tuusula.fi

Tuusula (Finnish: [ˈtuːsulɑ]; Swedish: Tusby [ˈtʉːsby]) is a municipality in Finland, located in the southern interior of the country. Tuusula is situated in the centre of the Uusimaa region. The population of Tuusula is approximately 42,000. It is the 27th most populous municipality in Finland and the second most populous municipality without city status (Finnish: kaupunki) after Nurmijärvi. Tuusula is part of the Helsinki metropolitan area, which has approximately 1.62 million inhabitants.

A laurel branch in the coat of arms of Tuusula refers to the local artist community and a wheellock was borrowed from the coat of arms of the Stålhane noble family, which has long been influential in Tuusula. The coat of arms was designed by Olof Eriksson in 1953.

== History ==
The area in what is now Tuusula was located in the larger municipality of Sipoo. It got its current name from its original inhabitants known as the Tuusas (based on the Germanic names Dose or Duse), who settled in the area centuries ago. The historical center called Tuusulan kirkonkylä ("Tuusula church village") was built on the shores of lake in the 16th century. In 1643, it became a separate parish in the municipality, and in 1653, it became a separate municipality. Tuusula's boundaries have not always remained the same: in 1924 the municipality of Kerava split from here; in 1950 the municipality of Korso was split between Tuusula, Kerava, and Sipoo; and in 1951 the municipality of Järvenpää split from here.

During the Crimean War (1853–1856), a Russian garrison was stationed in what is now Hyrylä. The modern parish mostly developed around it. Since the departure of the Helsinki Air Defence Regiment, the former garrison area has been redeveloped.

The area had always been a fairly fertile area, thus encouraging farming. The development of other industries began in 1795, when an ironworks was created in Kellokoski that functioned until the 1980s. The establishment of a railway in Jokela furthered the growth.

Soon after this industrial time another aspect of Tuusulan history was realised. The Tuusulanjärvi lake attracted many artists who wanted to paint the beautiful landscape. Following the footsteps of Aleksis Kivi, the Finnish national poet who spent the last years of his life in a hut on the shores of the lake, Jean Sibelius, Juhani Aho, and Pekka Halonen even established their main residences here. Recently these houses have become tourist sites, especially Sibelius' house Ainola. Also, Tuusula Lake Road on the eastern shore of the lake is an outside museum.

The Jokela rail crash was a rail crash which occurred on 21 April 1996 here.

Jokela High School was the site of the Jokela school shooting, a school shooting which occurred on 7 November 2007, leaving 9 dead (including the 18-year-old perpetrator, Pekka-Eric Auvinen).

== Geography ==
Tuusula, lying on the shores of Tuusulanjärvi lake, is located in the province of Southern Finland and is part of the Uusimaa region. It covers an area of 225.45 square kilometres (87.05 sq mi) of which 5.95 km^{2} (2.30 sq mi) is water. The population density is 193.5 inhabitants per square kilometre (501/sq mi).

Tuusula has three population centres. The administrative centre is Hyrylä (about 19,500 residents), other two are Jokela (5,300 residents) and Kellokoski (4,300 residents). The remaining 4,400 residents are distributed to the rural areas outside of municipal centres. The most significant main road connection between Hyrylä and Helsinki is the Tuusulanväylä motorway.

The neighbouring communes are Vantaa to the south, Nurmijärvi to the west, Hyvinkää to the north, Mäntsälä and Järvenpää to the north east, and Sipoo and Kerava to the east.

=== Villages ===
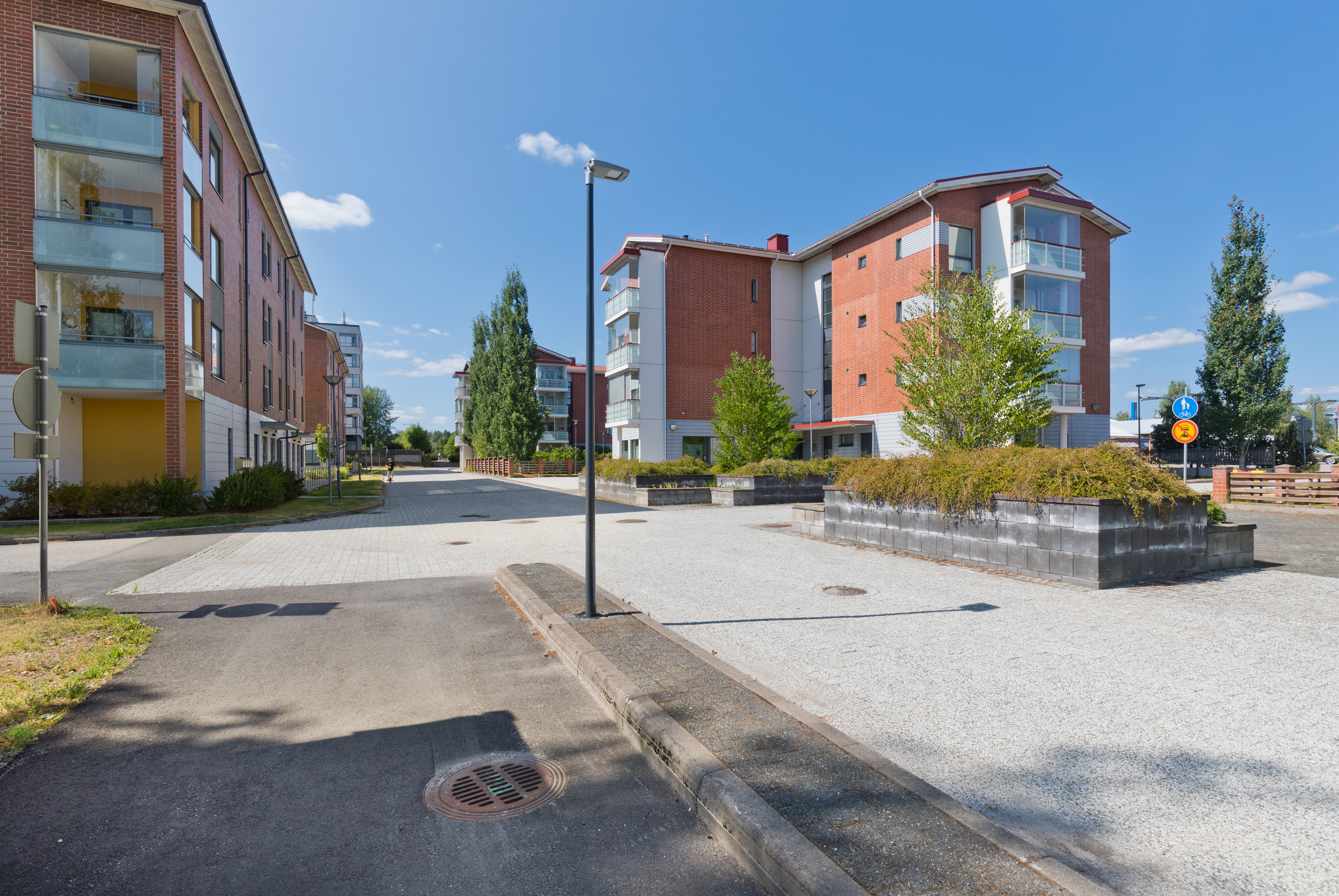
Apartment buildings along the Asemanraitti street in Jokela

Huikko, Hyrylä, Jokela, Jäniksenlinna, Kellokoski, Kirkonkylä, Lahela, Myllykylä, Nahkela, Paijala, Riihikallio, Ruotsinkylä, Ruskela, Rusutjärvi, Savikulma, Siippoo, Vanhakylä

== Demographics ==
Historical population
Year	Pop.	±%
1950	10,658	—
1960	13,856	+30.0%
1970	17,420	+25.7%
1980	22,412	+28.7%
1990	27,328	+21.9%
2000	31,957	+16.9%
2010	37,214	+16.5%
2020	38,783	+4.2%
Source: Doria, Statistics Finland

Tuusula, in the Helsinki suburbs, has been in a positive balance of population, with it more than doubling in size since 1970.

The municipality is officially Finnish. Swedish was the second official language until 1943. Today only 2% are Swedish-speaking.

== Politics ==
=== Parliamentary elections ===
Results of the 2019 Finnish parliamentary election in Tuusula:

- Finns Party 21%
- National Coalition Party 20.4%
- Social Democratic Party 16.5%
- Centre Party 12.3%
- Green League 11.3%
- Movement Now 5.3%
- Left Alliance 4.8%
- Blue Reform 2.6%
- Christian Democrats 2%
- Other parties 4%

=== Municipal Council ===
Composition of the Municipal Council (2005–2008)
Party	Percent of the council	Seats
National Coalition Party	26.2%	14
Tuusulan Puolesta (Eng. "For Tuusula")	25.2%	14
Social Democratic Party of Finland	25.1%	13
Centre Party	11.6%	5
Christian Democrats	3.2%	2
Left Alliance	3.5%	1
Green League	3.5%	1
Swedish People's Party	1.1%	1

=== Twin towns – Sister cities ===
Tuusula is twinned with:

Oppegård, Norway; Sollentuna Municipality, Sweden; Hvidovre Municipality, Denmark; Vinni, Estonia	Augustów, Poland; District Celle, Germany; Vidnoye, Russia; Querétaro, Mexico

== Culture ==
=== Dialect ===
The Finnish language spoken in the Tuusula area is based on the Southern Tavastian dialect and it belongs to the Nurmijärvi dialect subgroup. The language border between Finnish and Swedish languages has traditionally run across Tuusula, between Lahela and Ruotsinkylä, and its influence is still visible in place names.

=== Food ===
Tuusula belongs to the Uusimaa region in terms of food culture, which includes, among other things, fruit wine production made by different kind of berries. In the 1980s, the traditional dishes of Tuusula's parish were läskisoosi and oatmeal porridge as everyday dishes, and aspic, rosolli, veal roast, lanttulaatikko, porkkanalaatikko, yeast bread and raisin soup as festive meals.

=== Media ===
The local newspaper Keski-Uusimaa, which is the joint local newspaper of Tuusula, Järvenpää and Kerava, and is based in Tuusula.

== Economy ==
Due its proximity to the Helsinki, Tuusula is, for the most part, a commuter town. Tuusula itself has around 10,000 jobs. 66% of the jobs are in the service sector, 31% in the workforce, and 1.5% are farmers. The unemployment rate amounted to 3% (2007), far below the national average.

== Transport ==
From the centre of Tuusula, Hyrylä, there are good bus connections to Helsinki, via the Tuusula motorway. There are also two train stations in the main railway line of Finland, Jokela and Nuppulinna. Nuppulinna, however, was discontinued in 2016.

== Education ==
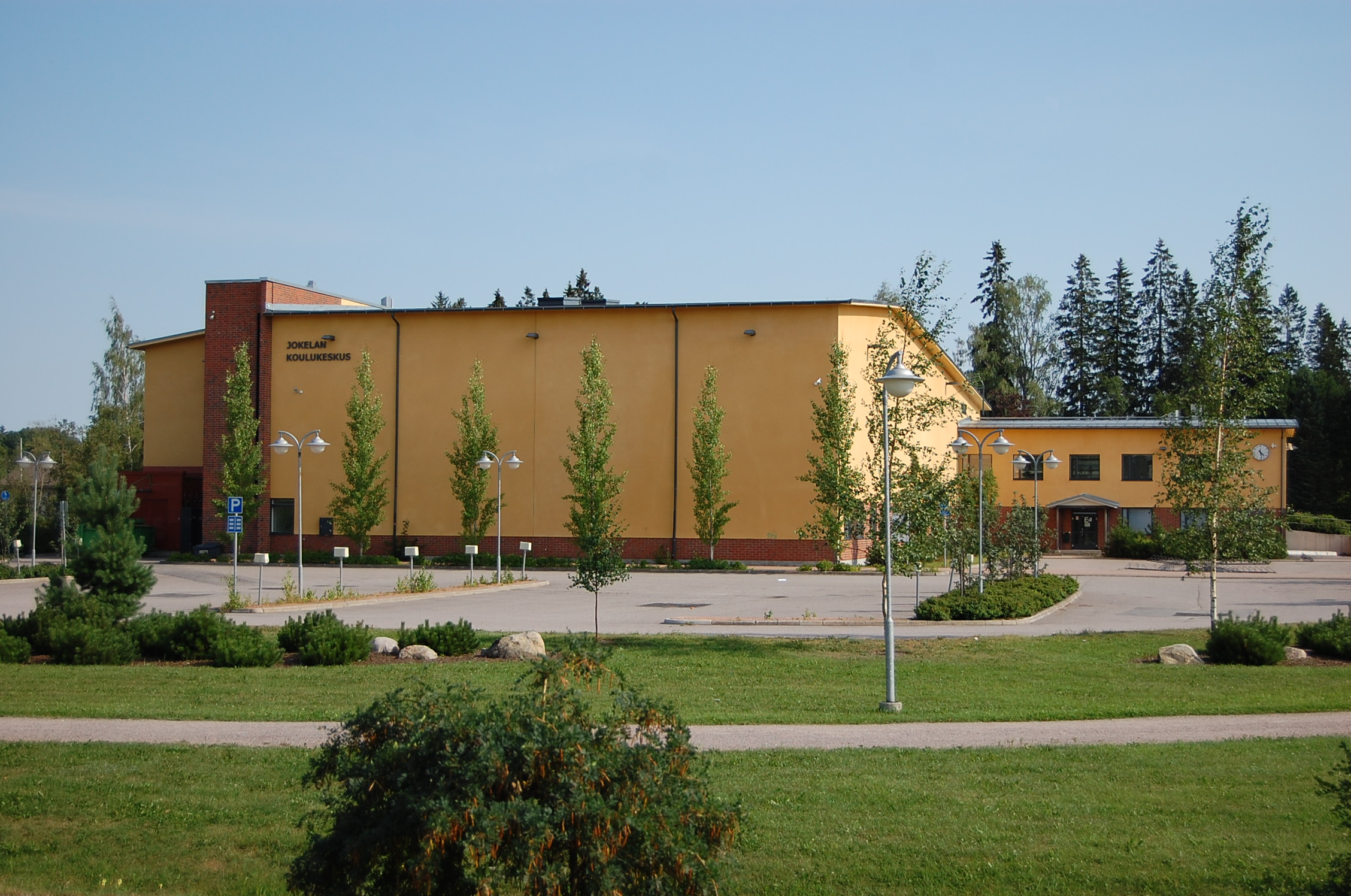
Jokela High School, one of high schools in Tuusula

Tuusula's network of schools include:

- 18 primary schools
- 4 secondary schools
- 3 high schools
- 1 hospital school

== Notable people ==
- Ilmari Juutilainen, the top flying ace of the Finnish Air Force
- Eino Leino, poet
- Teemu Suninen, rally driver

== See also ==
- For Tuusula
- Ring IV
- Tuusula Highway
