= Kerava =

Town in Uusimaa, Finland

Kerava Kervo
- Town
- Keravan kaupunki Kervo stad
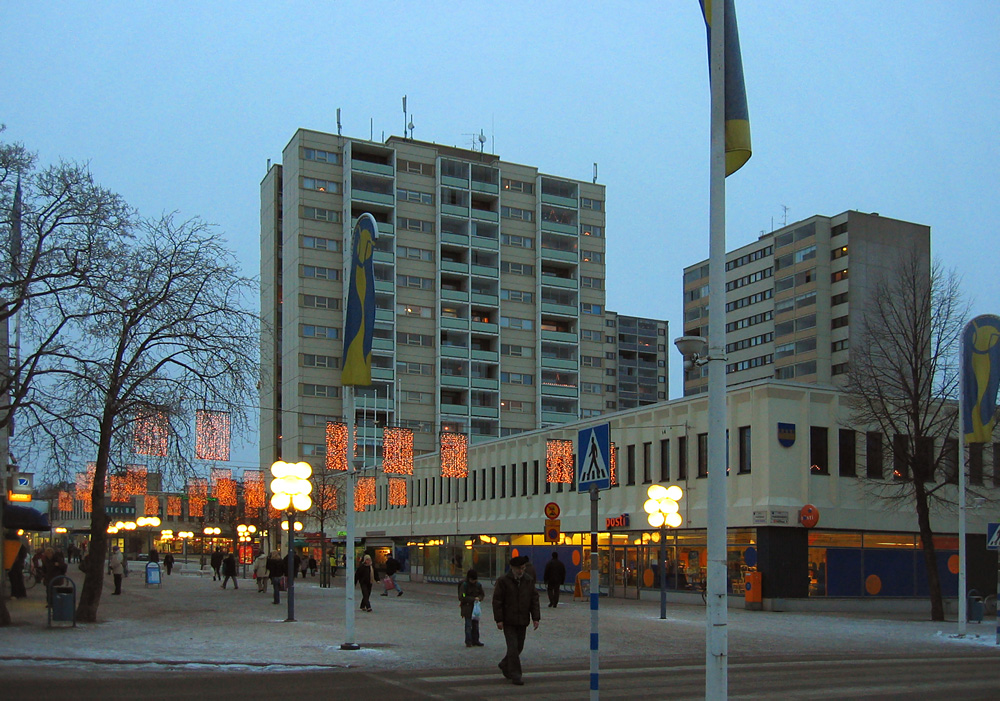
- Kerava town centre

- Coat of arms
- Nickname: Sherwood
- Location of Kerava in Finland
- Interactive map of Kerava
- Coordinates: 60°24′N 025°06′E
- Country: Finland
- Region: Uusimaa
- Sub-region: Helsinki sub-region
- Metropolitan area: Helsinki metropolitan area
- Township: 1924–1970
- City: 1970–

Government
  - Mayor: Kirsi Rontu

Area (2018-01-01)
  - Total: 30.79 km^{2} (11.89 sq mi)
  - Land: 30.63 km^{2} (11.83 sq mi)
  - Water: 0.17 km^{2} (0.066 sq mi)
  - Rank: 309th largest in Finland

Population (2025-12-31)
  - Total: 38,767
  - Rank: 30th largest in Finland
  - Density: 1,265.65/km^{2} (3,278.0/sq mi)

Population by native language
  - Finnish: 80.7% (official)
  - Swedish: 1.2%
  - Others: 18.1%

Population by age
  - 0 to 14: 16.3%
  - 15 to 64: 63.8%
  - 65 or older: 19.9%
- Time zone: UTC+02:00 (EET)
  - Summer (DST): UTC+03:00 (EEST)
- Climate: Dfb
- Website: www.kerava.fi/en/

Kerava (Finnish pronunciation: [ˈkerɑʋɑ]; Swedish: Kervo) is a town in Finland, located in the southern interior of the country. Kerava is situated in the centre of the Uusimaa region. The population of Kerava is approximately 39,000. It is the 30th most populous municipality in Finland. Kerava is part of the Helsinki Metropolitan Area, which has approximately 1.62 million inhabitants.

Kerava's neighbouring municipalities are Vantaa, Sipoo and Tuusula.

Kerava covers an area of 30.79 square kilometres (11.89 sq mi) of which 0.17 km^{2} (0.066 sq mi) is water. The population density is 1,265.65 inhabitants per square kilometre (3,278.0/sq mi). In terms of area, Kerava is the fifth smallest in Finland and the second smallest in the Uusimaa region after Kauniainen. However, it is also the third most densely populated area in the sub-region after Helsinki and Kauniainen. The municipality is monolingual Finnish.

The Sinebrychoff brewery operations are based in Kerava. There is also a well-known prison in the town (Keravan vankila), which includes 94 places in the open prison ward.

== Etymology ==
Kerava is first mentioned in historical sources in 1443 under the Swedish name Kervo, which is based on the Finnish name Kerava. The name may be linked to the word kero, which refers to a maw, gullet, or throat. However, a weakness of this explanation is that the word is known with these meanings only in North Karelia and Kainuu—far from the locations where the name "Kerava" actually appears. Another explanation links the name to a boundary location. Names like Kerava are broadly associated with border sites, which is likely what they were at the time the names were given. The area of the present-day town of Kerava, situated on the border between Tuusula and Sipoo, became a boundary between language groups following the Swedish colonization of the 13th and 14th centuries. Consequently, places named Kerava may have originated as disputed borderlands.

Kerava's nickname, "Sherwood", stems from the local rockabilly boom and youth culture of the 1970s, during which the town's Swedish name, Kervo, was twisted into the form "Sherwood."

== History ==
The former coat of arms of Kerava (1946–1955)

Until the Middle Ages, Kerava was a wilderness, until two villages, Ylikerava ("Upper Kerava") and Alikerava ("Lower Kerava"), were created along the Kerava River (Keravanjoki). The first signs of established village settlement date back to the 1440s. Kerava was annexed to Tuusula when the Tuusula parish was founded in 1643. In 1862, the railway between Helsinki and Hämeenlinna was opened, which quickly brought industry to agricultural Kerava; the carpentry factory in Kerava was established in 1908, and the wood industry became an important factor in the development of the town. The coat of arms designed by Ahti Hammar features a woodworking joints made by a carpenter.

In 1924, Kerava was separated from Tuusula as its own township. At that time, it had a population of about 3,000. Originally, it also included part of the Korso area, and Korso railway station was also located in the township area. However, from 1954 onwards, the entire Korso was annexed to the then Helsinki Rural Municipality. During the peak periods of the late 1960s and 1970s, the population almost doubled due to immigration and good transport connections, and new suburbs were created in Kurkela, Kilta and Untola. Kerava was officially granted town rights in 1970.

== Geography ==
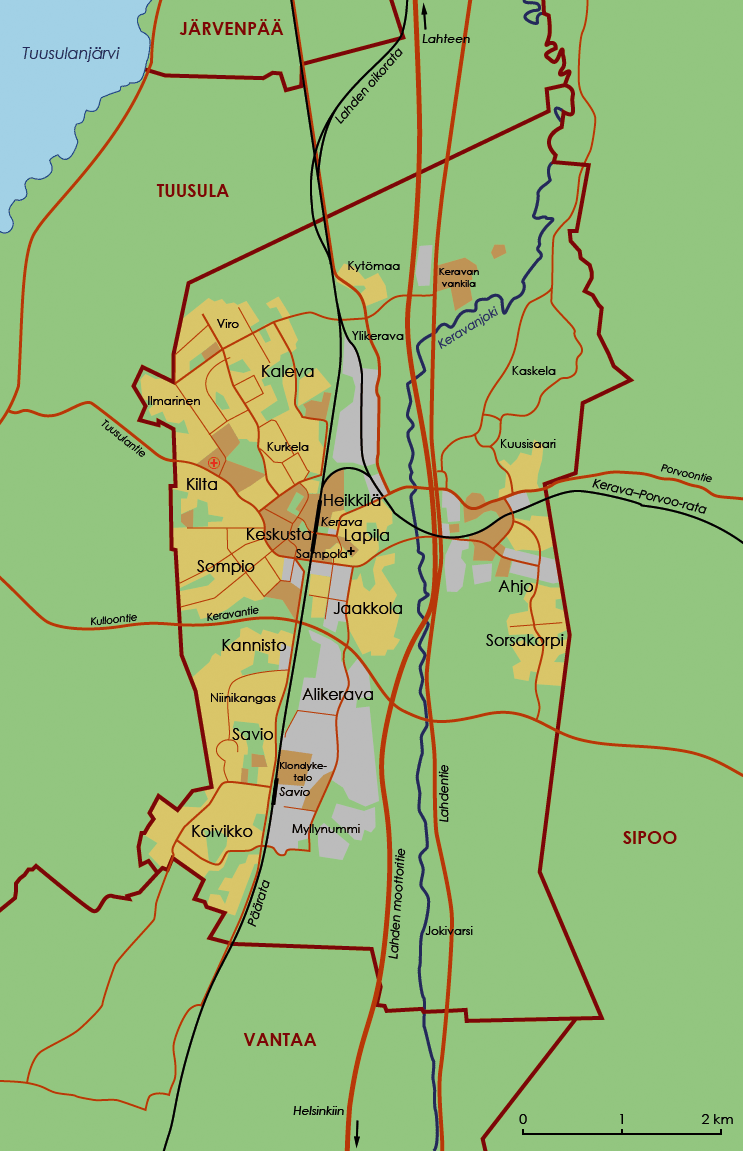
Map of the Kerava town

Kerava is located in the north of the Helsinki metropolitan area, 27 kilometres north of Helsinki. The city is crossed by the (Helsinki-) Kerava–Lahti railway line and the Lahdenväylä motorway and the Keravanjoki river. Keravanjoki is a tributary of the Vantaanjoki river. Its neighbours are Vantaa to the south, Tuusula to the west and Sipoo to the east. Kerava forms an almost uniform urban area, which can be roughly divided into the centre and Savio in the south and Ahjo in the east. The centre of Kerava is surrounded by several radial streets. A pedestrian street runs through the centre under the railway, which is said to be the longest in Finland (850 metres).

Kerava is divided into 10 neighbourhoods.

Number	Name
1	Kaleva
2	Kilta
3	Sompio
4	Keskusta
5	Ahjo
6	Savio
7	Ylikerava
8	Kaskela
9	Alikerava
10	Jokivarsi

== Demographics ==
Historical population
Year	Pop.	±%
1950	8,215	—
1960	9,925	+20.8%
1970	14,348	+44.6%
1980	23,851	+66.2%
1990	27,597	+15.7%
2000	30,270	+9.7%
2010	34,282	+13.3%
2020	37,105	+8.2%
Source: Doria, Statistics Finland

The city of Kerava has 38,767 inhabitants, making it the 30th most populous municipality in Finland. The city of Kerava is part of the Helsinki metropolitan area, which is the largest urban area in Finland with 1,623,283 inhabitants.

=== Languages ===
Population by
mother tongue (2025)
1. Finnish (80.7%)
2. Estonian (3.40%)
3. Russian (2.90%)
4. Arabic (1.30%)
5. Ukrainian (1.20%)
6. Swedish (1.20%)
7. English (0.80%)
8. Other (8.50%)

Kerava is a monolingual Finnish-speaking municipality. The majority of the population, 31,291 persons (80.7%), spoke Finnish as their first language. In addition, the number of Swedish speakers was 447 persons (1.2%) of the population. Foreign languages were spoken by 18.1% of the population. As English and Swedish are compulsory school subjects, functional bilingualism or trilingualism acquired through language studies is not uncommon.

At least 40 different languages are spoken in Kerava. The most common foreign languages are Estonian (3.4%), Russian (2.9%), Arabic (1.3%), Ukrainian (1.2%) and English (0.8%).

=== Immigration ===
Population by country of birth (2024)
Nationality	Population	%
Finland	32,573	84.7
Estonia	1,225	3.2
Soviet Union	788	2.0
Turkey	226	0.6
Ukraine	215	0.6
Iraq	212	0.6
Vietnam	190	0.5
Thailand	166	0.4
Russia	159	0.4
Sweden	154	0.4
Afghanistan	153	0.4
Other	2,400	6.2

As of 2024, there were 6,777 persons with a foreign background living in Kerava, or 16% of the population. (Note: Statistics Finland classifies a person as having a "foreign background" if both parents or the only known parent were born abroad.) The number of residents who were born abroad was 5,888, or 15% of the population. The number of persons with foreign citizenship living in Kerava was 4,715. Most foreign-born citizens came from Estonia, the former Soviet Union, Turkey and Ukraine.

The relative share of immigrants in Kerava's population is above the national average. Moreover, the city's new residents are increasingly of foreign origin. This will increase the proportion of foreign residents in the coming years.

=== Religion ===
In 2023, the Evangelical Lutheran Church was the largest religious group with 53.7% of the population of Kerava. Other religious groups accounted for 3.4% of the population. 42.9% of the population had no religious affiliation.

== Economy ==
In 2023, the operating margin funded by Kerava's tax revenues and central government transfers exceeded €82 million. Kerava's municipal income tax rate for 2025 is 7.00 percent. In 2022, the five largest corporate tax payers in Kerava were Sinebrychoff, Metos, Sinebrychoff Supply Company, Verman, and Vink Finland.

== Transport ==
Kerava has two railway stations, Kerava Central Railway Station and Savio station. The Kerava Central Railway Station is an interchange station, with connections from the main track from Helsinki to Riihimäki to the tracks to Lahti and Porvoo. The Helsinki Airport (HEL) is located about 15 kilometers to the southwest of the city by car. It is 32 kilometres (20 mi) along Highway 4 (E75) from Kerava to the city center of Helsinki.

The city of Kerava joined Helsinki Regional Transport Authority (HSL) in 2010.

== Culture ==
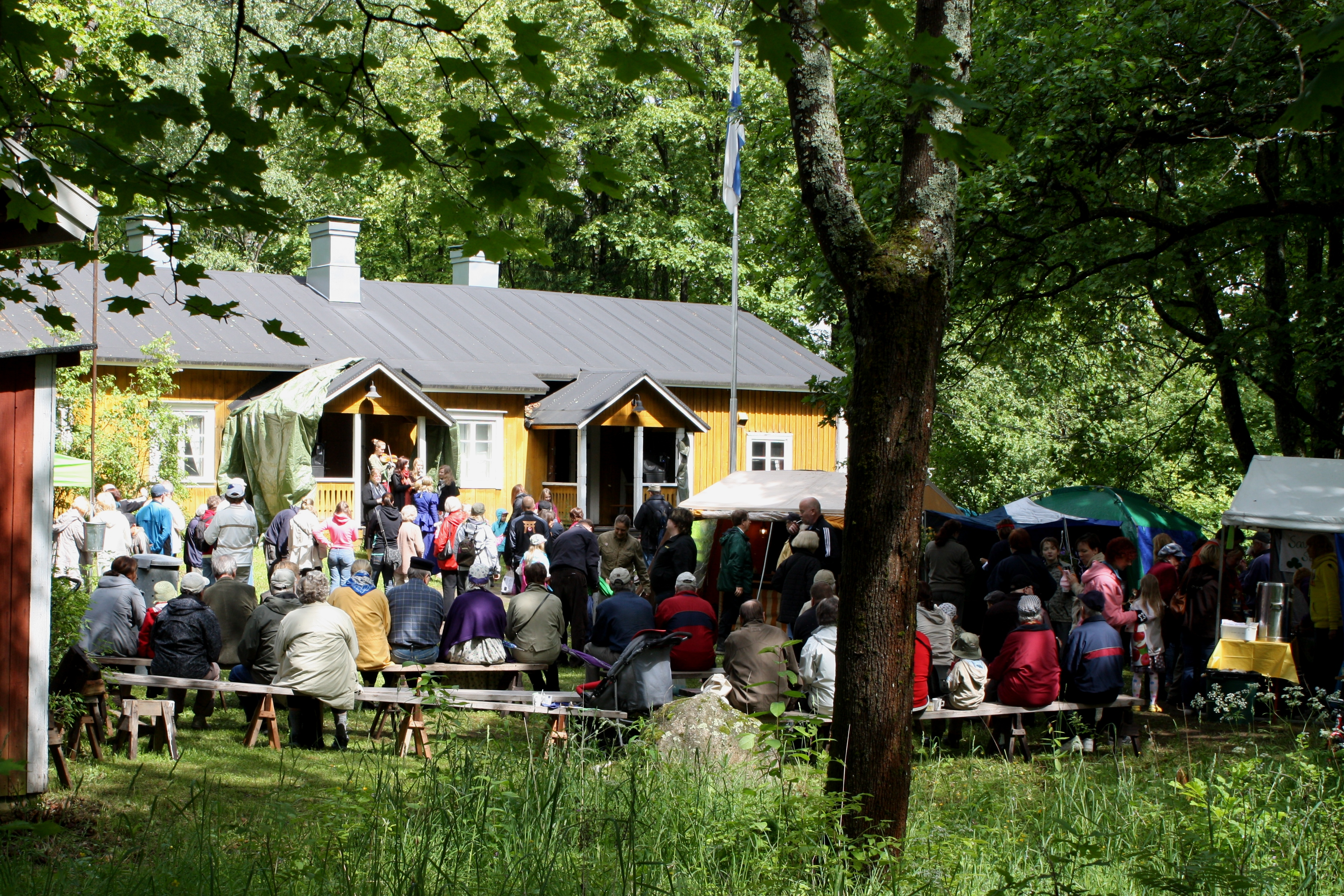
An annual Kerava Day audience at Kerava Local History Museum in 2010

=== Dialect ===
The spoken language in the Kerava area is based on the South Tavastian dialect of Tuusula, which belongs to the Nurmijärvi subgroup.

=== Events ===
Every June, the town hosts the annual Kerava Day event open to all free of charge. Another significant annual event is the Kerava Jazz music festival, held every September.

=== Food ===
Many garlic dishes were named as traditional foods of the Kerava parish in the 1980s: Yrjö's lamb (à la Jorgos), garlic potatoes and crushed garlic in oil, and, as a dessert, a gooseberry pie with vanilla sauce.

== Politics ==
Results of the 2019 Finnish parliamentary election in Kerava:

- Social Democratic Party 19,8%
- National Coalition Party 19,3%
- Finns Party 19,0%
- Green League 12,9%
- Left Alliance 8,6%
- Centre Party 6,8%
- Movement Now (common list of Uusimaa) 4,4%
- Christian Democrats 3,2%
- Blue Reform 1,9%

== Notable people from Kerava ==
- President J. K. Paasikivi (1870–1956), lived in Kerava from 1917 to the 1940s
- Hanna-Maria Seppälä (b. 1984), Finnish freestyle swimmer
- Volmari Iso-Hollo (1907–1969), Olympic medalist
- Jean Sibelius (1865–1957), Finnish composer
- Väinö Bremer (1899-1964), Finnish Olympic medalist biathlete and pilot who died here in a plane crash

== See also ==
- Järvenpää
- Kerava River
- Nikkilä
- Sinebrychoff
