= Pro Vantaa =

Pro Vantaa is a local political party in the municipality of Vantaa, Finland. In the 2004 municipal elections the party received 1015 votes (1.4%), giving it one seat in the municipal council, represented by Ensio Laaksonen.
