= Nurmijärvi Church =

Church in Nurmijärvi, Finland

Coordinates: 60°27′34″N 24°48′29″E

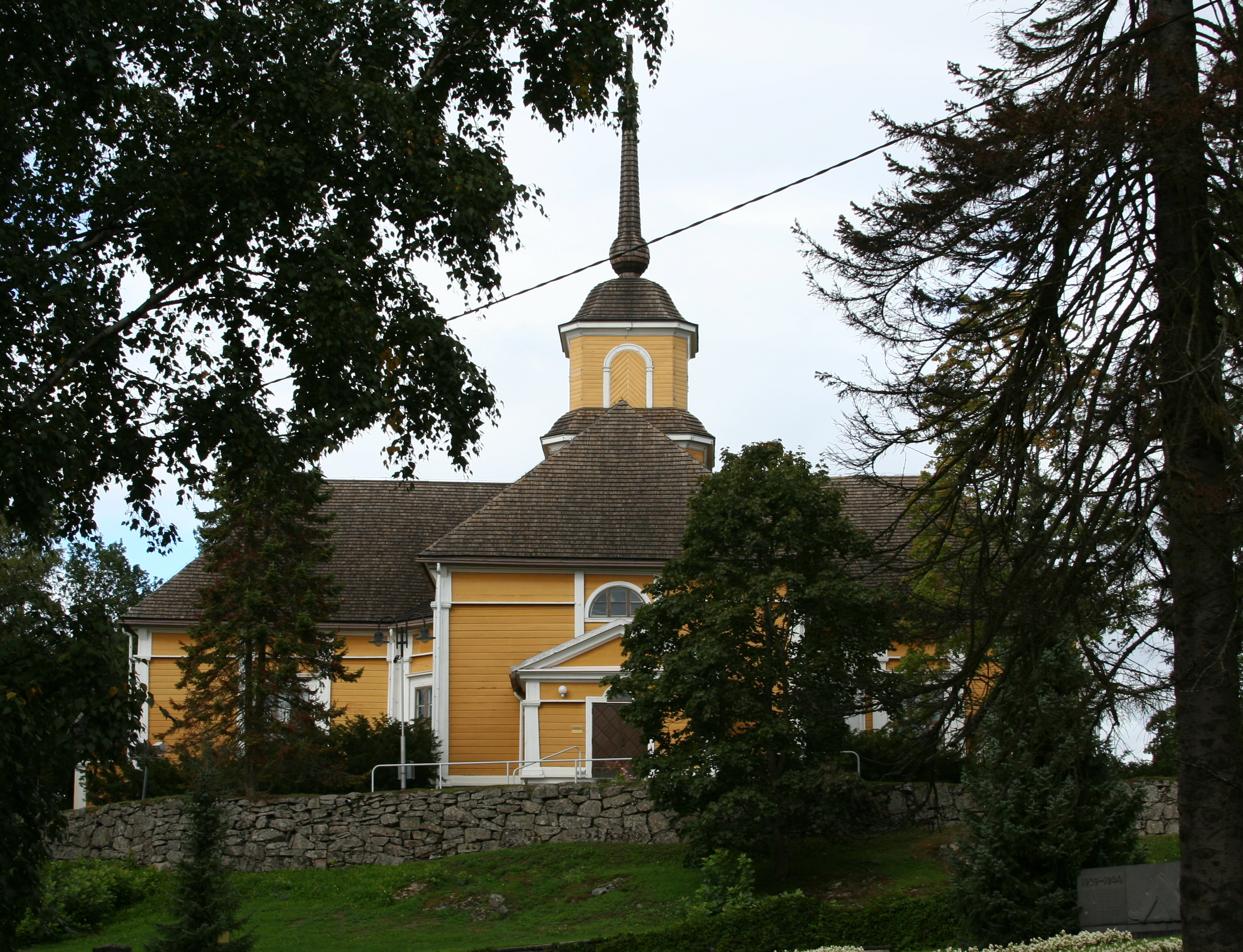
Nurmijärvi church in September 2011

Nurmijärvi Church (Finnish: Nurmijärven kirkko, Swedish: Nurmijärvi kyrka) is a wooden church in Nurmijärvi, built in 1793. The church was built by Matti Åkerblom. The bell tower was completed in 1795 and was built by Mats Åkergren. The church is the fourth wooden church built in the Nurmijärvi village, the previous church built in 1692 was demolished in 1793.

In 1776 King Gustav III ordered the churches to be built of stone. The lawns leaned on the parish of the church and were allowed to build a wooden church. At the end of the 18th century, the church was on the shore of the lake, but the "Kirkkojärvi" was drained in the 20th century.

The Church is a transcendental cross church. There are bevels in the inner corner, and there are hallways at the end of the three bars. The ungodly shroud of the church has a roof razor.

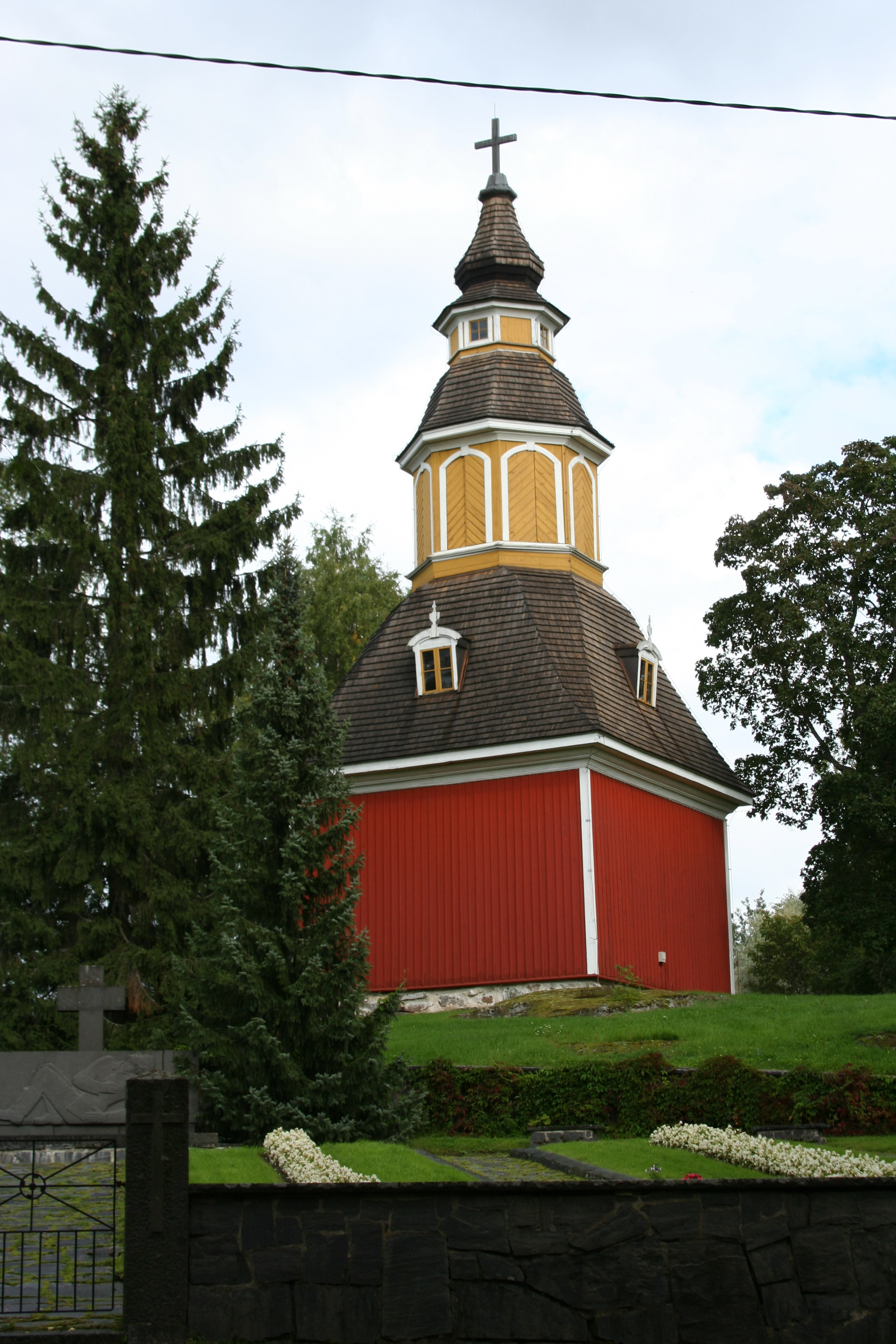
Bell tower

A lot of artefacts have been donated to the church, such as a candlestick, a candlestick and vases hanging on a central cross. Also stained glass has been donated.

The appearance and interior of the church has been changed several times. The current look is from 1932. The church was painted externally in the renovation of 1993, when the roof was also greeted. Changes have also taken place indoors. For example, in the 1830s, images of the Apostles and other biblical images covered with white paint in the 1880s were painted in magazines and pulpit. The interior was repaired and painted on the church's 200th anniversary, and old wall paintings were brought out. The 1993 repair was designed by Touko Saari Architects.

The altarpiece, the ascension of Jesus, is from 1832 and painted by C. Elfström. The late Baroque furrows built by Martti Porthan in 1993 are 30-fold. They are the third organ of the Church.

In the repair of the 1990s, the church benches were designed to be more comfortable to sit on, although they are otherwise original. The front seats are now portable as well as the altar bracket, making it easier to organize music and choir events in the church. The benchmark has been cut, the church was originally occupied by the then Nurmijärvi settlement population, about one thousand people.

The Nurmijärvi parish has two other churches, the Klaukkala Church completed in 2004 and the Rajamäki Church from 1938.

== See also ==
- Nurmijärvi Pentecostal Church
