= Röykkä =

- Village
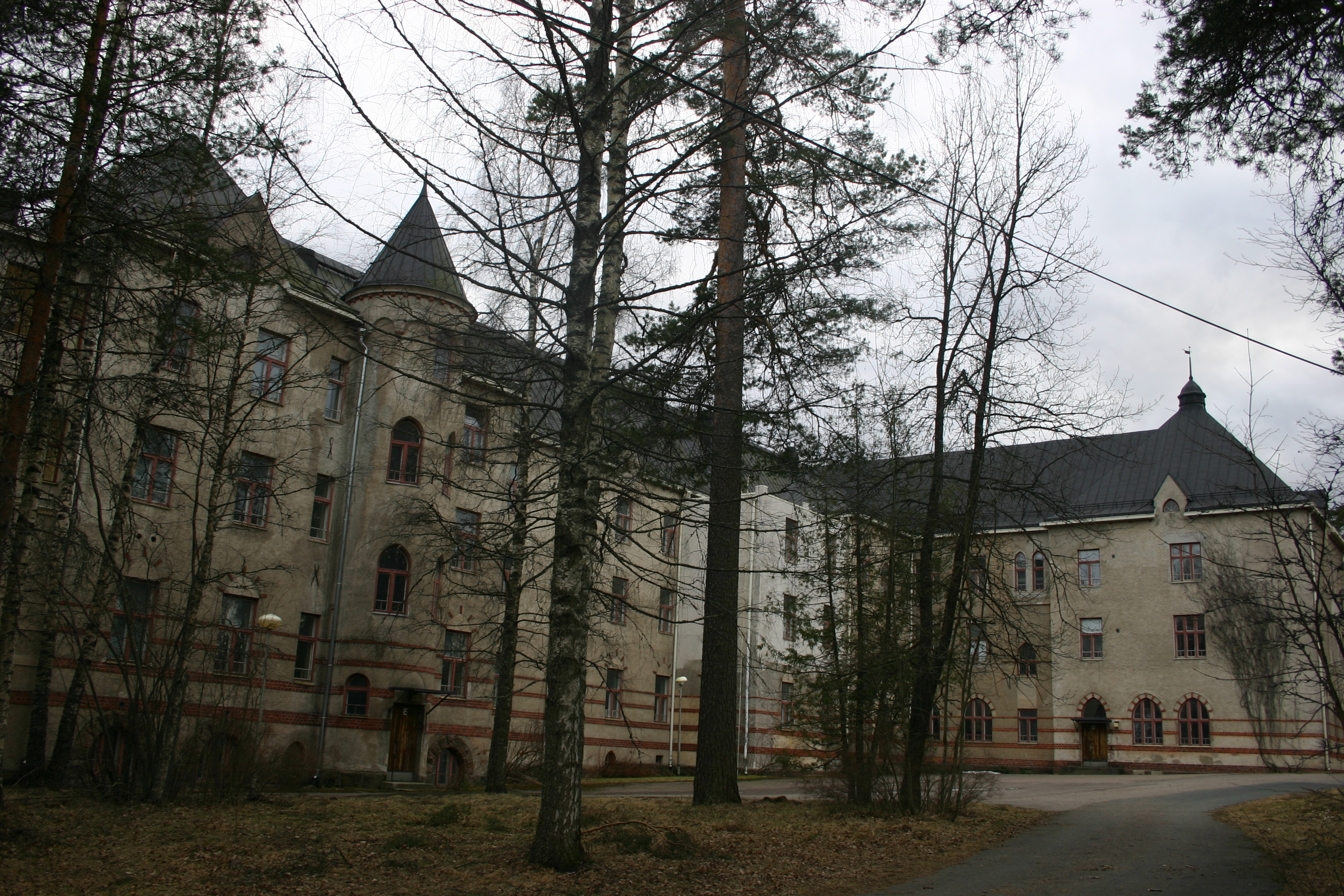
- Buildings of abolished Röykkä Hospital, formerly known as Nummela Sanatorium.

- Location in Finland
- Coordinates: 60°29.20′N 24°39.00′E
- Country: Finland
- Region: Uusimaa
- Municipality: Nurmijärvi

Area
  - Total: 375 km^{2} (145 sq mi)

Population (2017-12-31)
  - Total: 1,652
  - Density: 4,405/km^{2} (11,410/sq mi)
- Time zone: UTC+2 (EET)
  - Summer (DST): UTC+3 (EEST)
- Postal code: 05100

Röykkä (Finnish pronunciation: [ˈrøy̯kːæ]) is a village located in the Nurmijärvi municipality of Finland, near the border of Vihti municipality. It is fourth largest village in the municipality after Klaukkala, Rajamäki and Nurmijärvi's church village. The population is about 1,600.

Lake Sääksi, which is Finland's largest spring water lake, is located northside to the village, and there is Kotolahti, also known as "Little-Sääski" and "Röykänranta", which is a popular beach in Röykkä. There is also smaller Lake Vaaksi near to the village. On the northern shore of Lake Sääksi is the private tomb of the daughter of Kytäjä Manor's host, known as the "Tomb of Love" (Rakkaudenhauta).

Traditional Christmas events at the village include the Röykkä's Christmas Tree Party (Röykän kuusijuhla), when a light procession led by Santa Claus moves from school to the giant spruce tree on the centre of Röykkä to decorate it with lights.

== Transport ==
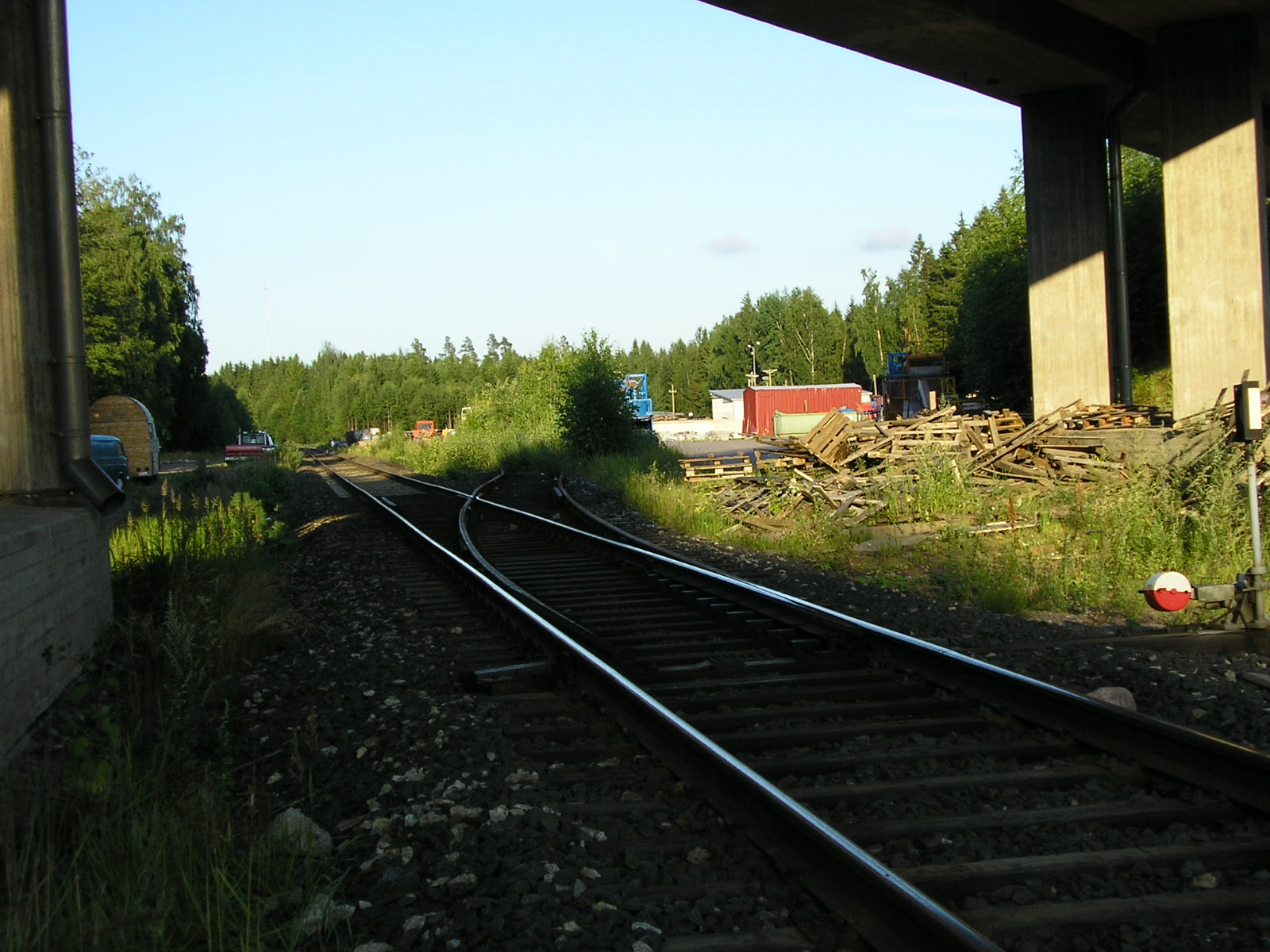
A railway in Röykkä.

The village is crossed by the Finnish regional road 132 (Mt 132) that runs between Loppi and Klaukkala. In the northern part of the village there is national road 25 (Vt 25), which runs between Hanko and Mäntsälä.

Hanko–Hyvinkää railway also runs next to the village, but the Röykkä railway station from 1911 was closed in 1977.

=== Distances from other cities ===
- Helsinki 43 km
- Loppi 33 km
- Klaukkala 14 km
- Nurmijärvi 12 km
- Rajamäki 8 km

== Buildings ==
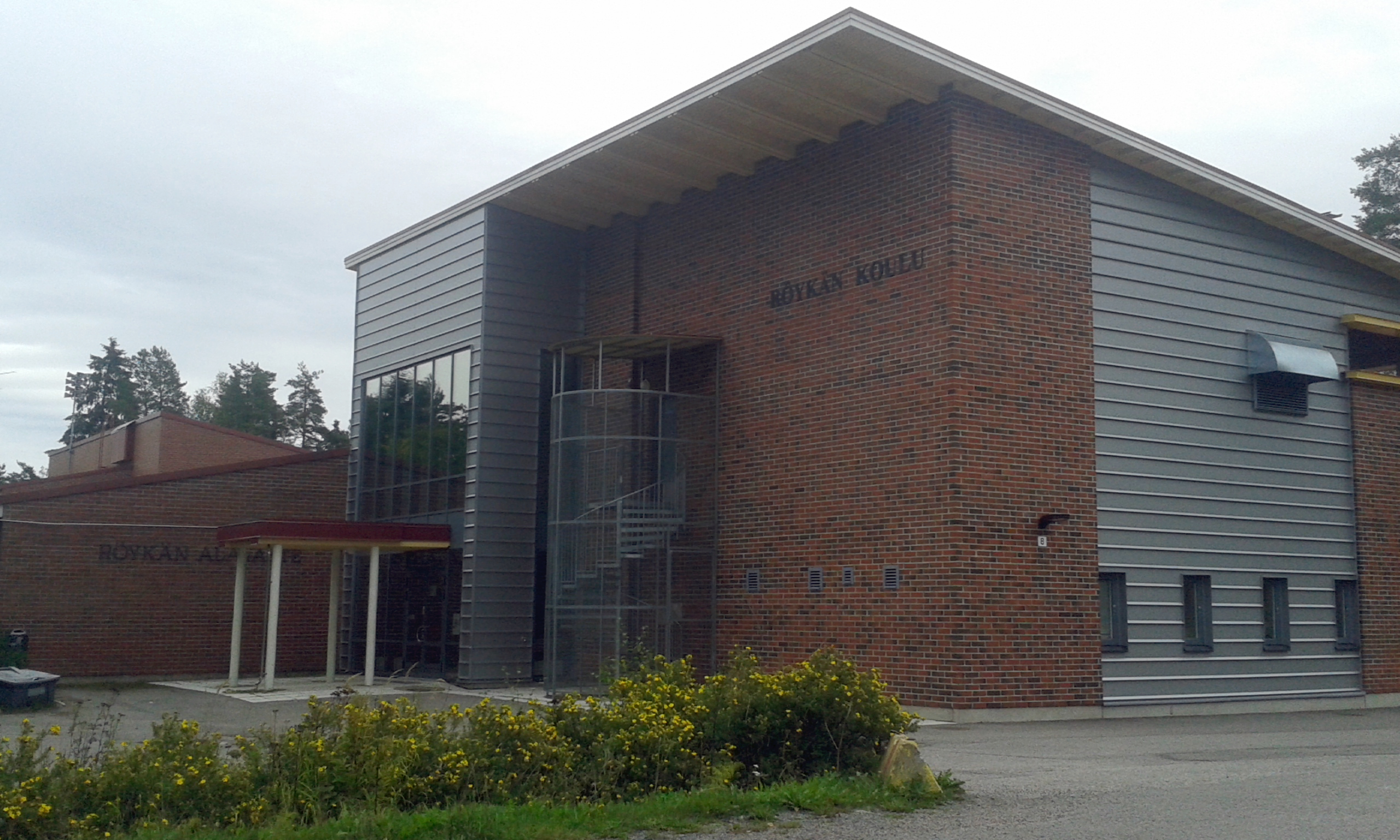
A primary school in Röykkä.

In the middle of Röykkä, there is a grocery store, a pizzeria and little coffee house. Also, there is a primary school in Kassakumpu, the largest and growing residential area of Röykkä, but the nearest secondary school is located in the neighboring village Rajamäki.

The railway station, located along the Hanko–Hyvinkää railway, was built and commissioned in 1911 and closed in 1977. Finnish model and PR Manager Ellen Jokikunnas bought building in 2007 to renovating it her new home.

=== Sanatorium ===
In the northern part of Röykkä, there is a former Art Nouveau-styled tuberculosis sanatorium known as Nummela Sanatorium designed by architect Magnus Schjerfbeck in 1903. Sanatorium was closed down in 1932 and replaced by a mental hospital. In 1989, the hospital was also closed down and has been completely disabled ever since. In the spring of 2022, the Röykkä Invest Oy company bought the hospital building for €1,5 million; one of the founders of the company is the actor Jasper Pääkkönen, who announced in the summer of the same year that he was planning to turn the former sanatorium into a hotel.

Local rumors tell that paranormal phenomena have been observed in an abandoned hospital. According to several visitors the windows of the building show mysterious lights, as well as a woman who commits suicide by jumping off the roof. According to another rumor, the hospital is haunted by the spirit of a girl who died there at a young age.

== Notable people ==
- Elmer Diktonius (1896–1961), author and poet
- Ellen Jokikunnas (born 1976), model and PR manager
- Matti Mattila (1912–1990), agricultural counselor
- Toivo Salervo (1888–1977), architect

== See also ==
- Kiljava
- Leppälampi
