= Nurmijärvi (village) =

Nurmijärven kirkonkylä
- Municipal center
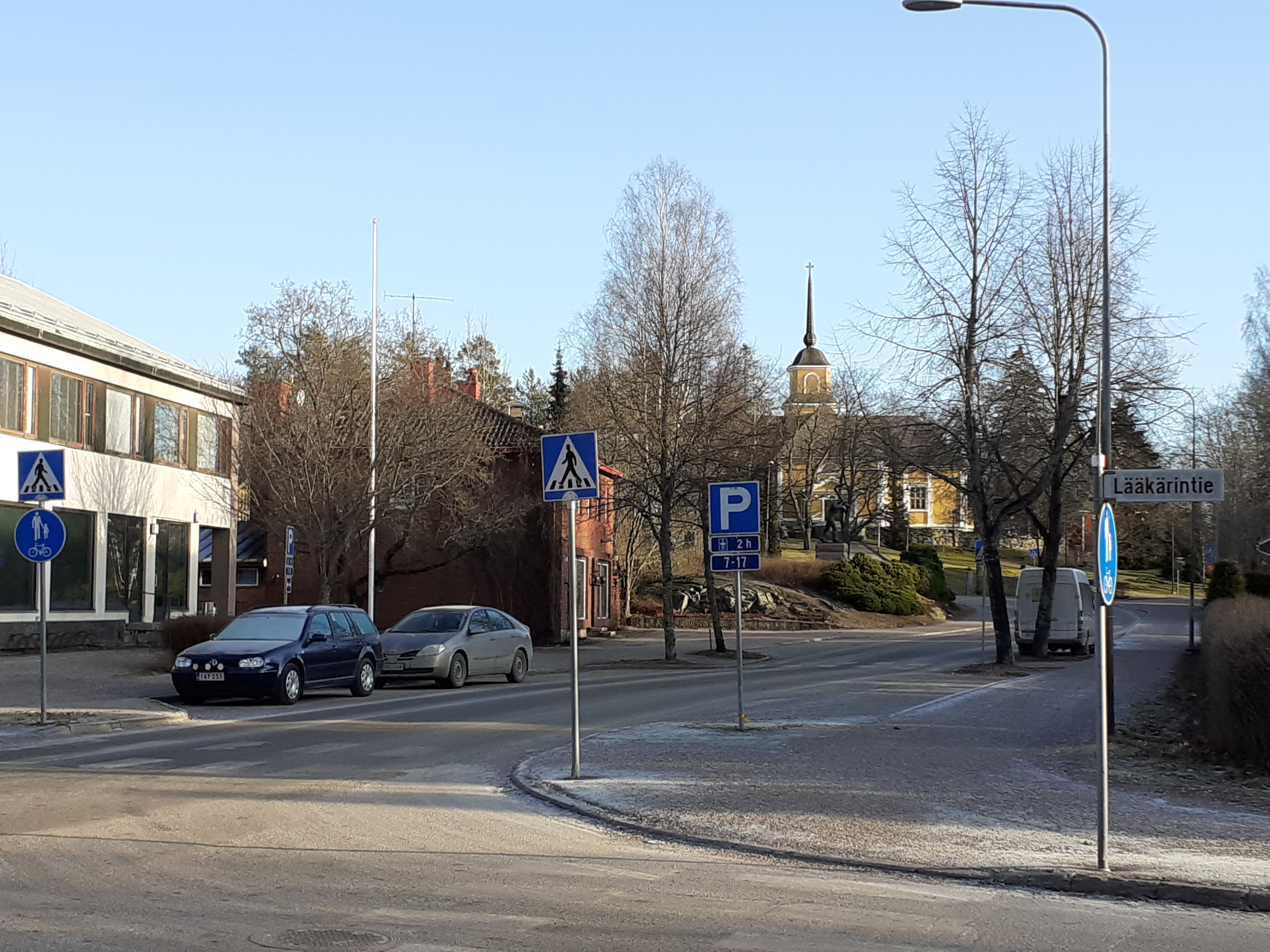
- Town center along the Aleksis Kiven tie street.

- Location in Finland
- Coordinates: 60°27′47″N 24°48′40″E
- Country: Finland
- Region: Uusimaa
- Municipality: Nurmijärvi

Area
  - Total: 11.27 km^{2} (4.35 sq mi)

Population (31 December 2017)
  - Total: 7,429
  - Density: 6,592/km^{2} (17,070/sq mi)
- Time zone: UTC+2 (EET)
  - Summer (DST): UTC+3 (EEST)
- Postal code: 01900

Nurmijärven kirkonkylä (lit. 'Nurmijärvi church village') is the administrative center of the Nurmijärvi municipality in Uusimaa, Finland. At the end of 2018, the population of the urban area, in accordance with Statistics Finland's agglomeration area, was 7,429 which made it the second most-populated urban area of the municipality after Klaukkala. It is located 8 kilometres (5.0 mi) from Rajamäki, 13 kilometres (8.1 mi) from Röykkä and 16 kilometres (9.9 mi) from Klaukkala.

The connecting road 1311 (former regional road 131) runs through the center between the Rajamäki and Hämeenlinnanväylä junctions. There is also a road connection to the center of Tuusula, as regional road 139 runs through the village of Palojoki towards Hyrylä. The largest industrial and business area in the municipality, Ilvesvuori, is being built near the center by the Tampere Highway (E12), and a large logistics center owned by Kesko is being built there, among other things.

Nurmijärvi center has many service sector jobs. Its municipal services include the municipal hall, library, several grocery stores, main health center, fire station and police station. It also has two primary schools (Maaniittu school and Lukkari School) and one high school. Other facilities include a cinema and bus station. The grocery chain Lidl and the discount store chain Tokmanni opened their stores in August 2022. There is also Finland's only Erätukku, a store specializing in wilderness, hiking and fishing equipment, which reopened in 2018 with the help of a new owner. In 2021, the Bowling Corner & Billiard Leisure Venue was opened where people can go bowling and play billiards.

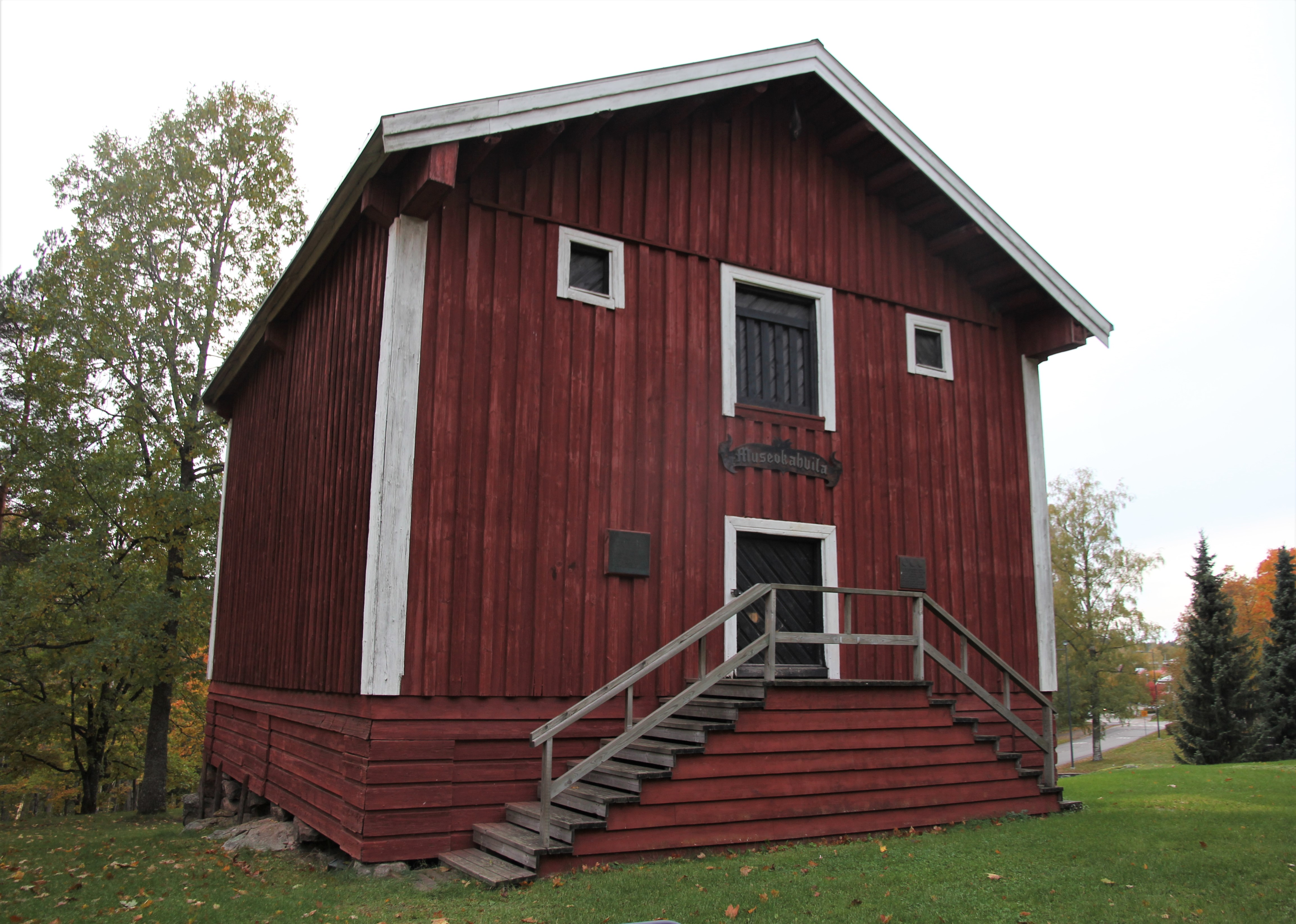
Nurmijärvi Museum Coffeehouse (Nurmijärven museokahvila), a local museum and former parish warehouse right next to the Nurmijärvi Church

On Aleksis Kiven tie street is the Nurmijärvi Church (1793), the cemetery, the old rectory called Lukkarila, and Mäntylä, the house of Malakias Costiander, the first schoolmaster of Nurmijärvi and a teacher of Aleksis Kivi. Near the church was the first pharmaceutical factory in Finland, founded by Albin Koponen. Lake Nurmijärvi (also called Kirkkojärvi, 'church lake') was located near the municipal center, but it was first partially drained in the 1920s and then completely drained in the 1950s to gain more farmland.

The village served as a filming location for the 1954 comedy film Hilma's Name Day (Hilmanpäivät), directed by Matti Kassila.

== See also ==
- Rajamäki (village)
- Vihti (village)
