= Leppälampi =

- Village
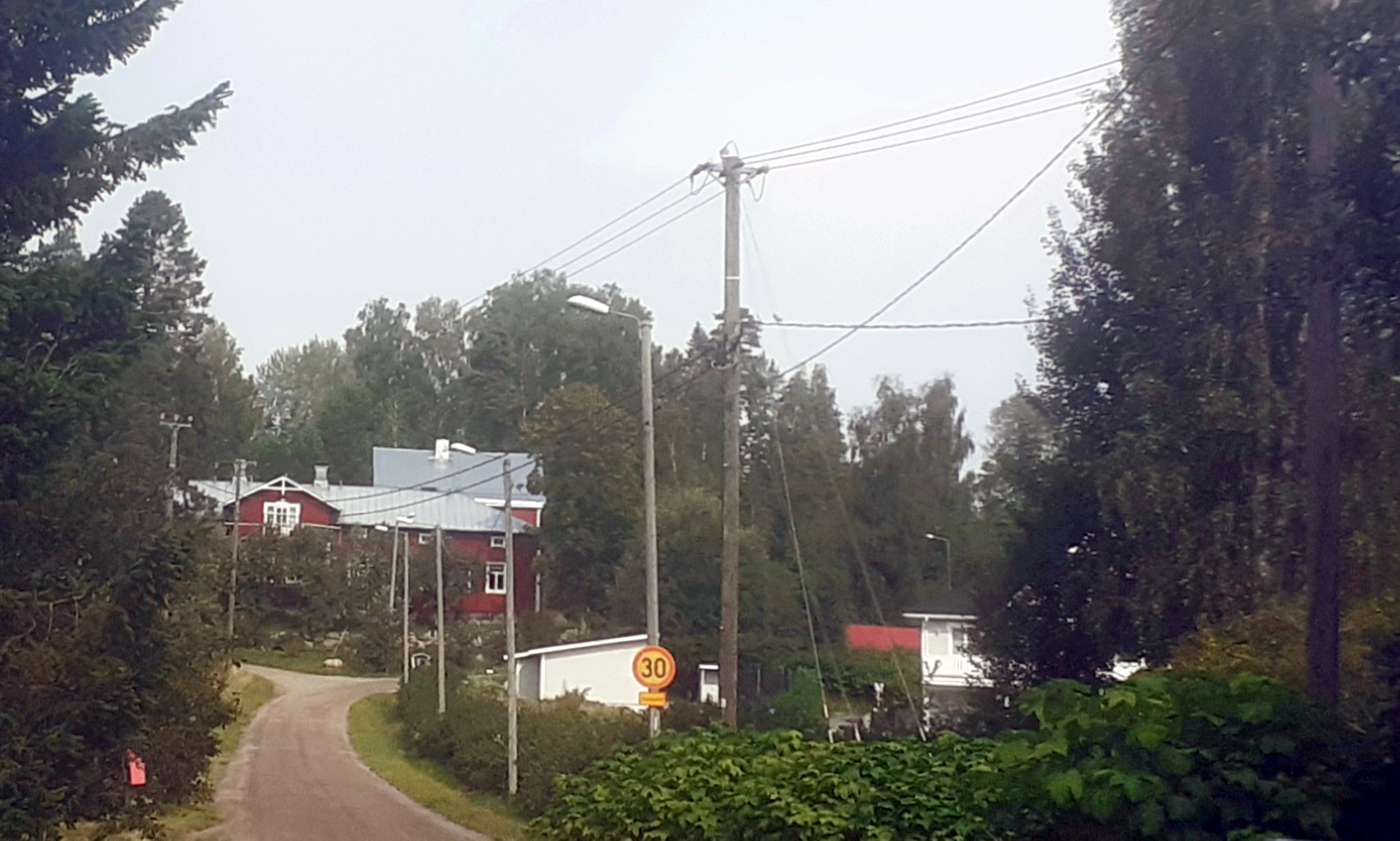
- Kouluntie road in Leppälampi.
- Interactive map of Leppälampi
- Coordinates: 60°29.1286′N 24°36.0701′E
- Country: Finland
- Region: Uusimaa
- Sub-region: Greater Helsinki
- Municipality: Nurmijärvi

Population (12-31-2020)
  - Total: 272

Leppälampi (Finnish pronunciation: [ˈlepːæˌlɑmpi]; literally translated the "alder pond") is a village in Nurmijärvi municipality in Uusimaa, Finland. It is located in the northwest corner of the municipality, near Haimoo and Vihtijärvi, the villages of Vihti. The village is located along the Korventie road, which goes west from Röykkä, and along Highway 25 between Hanko and Mäntsälä, and it has partly formed into its current form with the village of Korpi. In the south is the village of Nummenpää. The population of Leppälampi was 272 at the end of 2020.

Leppälampi is especially known for its Nurmijärvi Golf center. In the village, there is a building of the Röykkä-Leppälampi Youth Association, which can be rented for various events. The village also formerly housed the old Korpi-Leppälampi School, which was sold by the municipality in 2007.

== See also ==
- Röykkä
- Vihtijärvi
