= Taaborinvuori =

Museum area in Uusimaa, Finland

Coordinates: 60.42443°N 24.86508°E

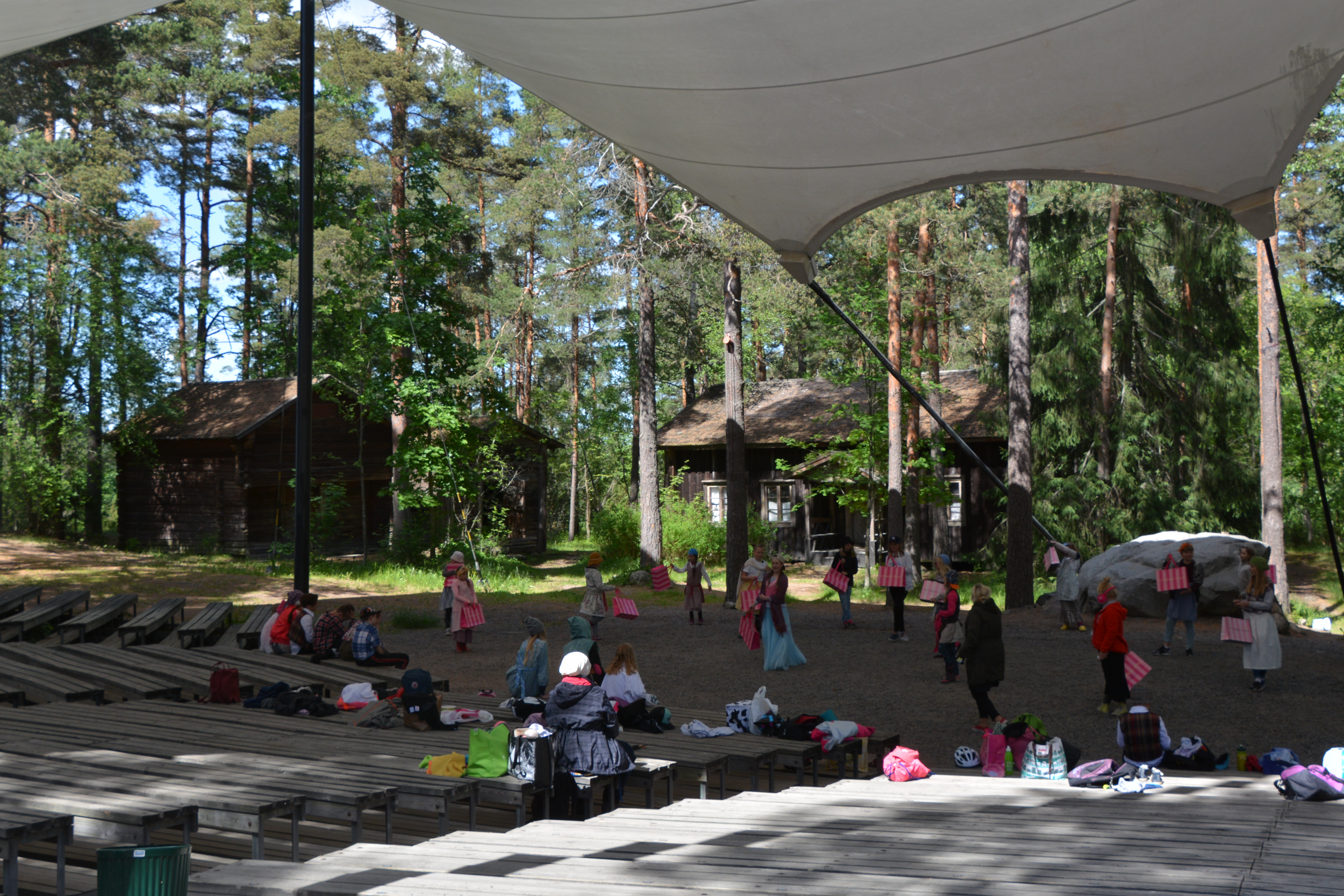
Taaborinvuori outdoor theatre show in summer 2016

Taaborinvuori (Finnish pronunciation: [ˈtɑːborinˌʋuo̯ri]) is a museum area in the Palojoki village in Nurmijärvi, Finland. The museum area consists of buildings imported from all over Nurmijärvi, whose exhibitions tell about everyday life in Nurmijärvi at the beginning of the 20th century. It was founded at the turn of the 1970s and 1980s.

Taaborinvuori belonged to the childhood landscapes of the Finnish author Aleksis Kivi, and he also named it after Mount Tabor in Israel, familiar from biblical accounts. Kivi's birthplace is located next to Taaborinvuori hill. The Kivi festival (Kivi-juhlat), which has performed the production of Aleksis Kivi since 1952, takes place every summer at the outdoor theatre of Taaborinvuori. The theater is also used by other event organizers, such as the Taabori Summer Theater (Taaborin Kesäteatteri), which is directed by director, screenwriter and author Taavi Vartia. The auditorium has a capacity of 700 people and most of the auditorium is covered.
