= Matti Mattila =

Finnish agronomist, farmer and politician (1912–1990)

Matti Emil Mattila (5 December 1912 – 29 July 1990) was a Finnish agronomist, farmer and politician, born in Nurmijärvi. He was a member of the Parliament of Finland from 1954 to 1975, representing the Agrarian League, which changed its name to Centre Party in 1965. He was a presidential elector in the 1956, 1962 and 1968 presidential elections.
