= The Pentecostal Church of Finland =

Christian denomination in Finland

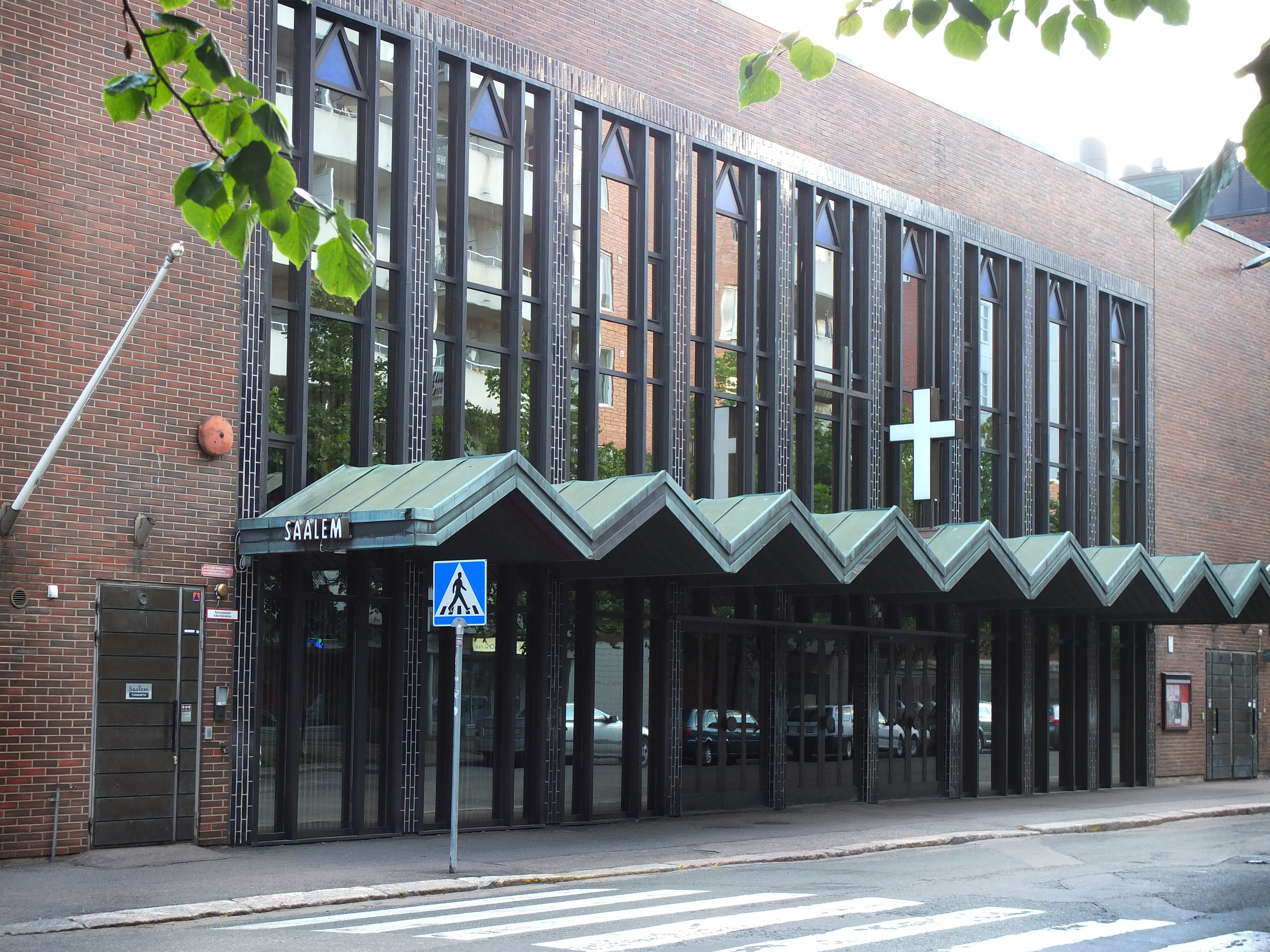
- Saalem Temple in Helsinki
- Abbreviation: SHK
- Classification: Protestant
- Orientation: Pentecostalism
- Polity: Congregational
- Executive manager: Esko Matikainen
- Board chair: Kauko Uusila
- Distinct fellowships: AOG; PWF; PEF
- Region: Finland
- Headquarters: Finland
- Origin: 2001
- Other name(s): Suomen helluntaikirkko
- Official website: suomenhelluntaikirkko.fi

The Pentecostal Church of Finland (Finnish: Suomen Helluntaikirkko, SHK) is a Pentecostal Christian denomination in Finland. It is a member of the Pentecostal World Fellowship, Pentecostal European Fellowship and World Assemblies of God Fellowship. Esko Matikainen is executive manager.

== History ==
The Pentecostal Church of Finland (SHK) was registered as a religious Finnish community on September 15, 2001. The decision was made at a special meeting at which leaders or delegates from 131 of the Finnish Pentecostal movements 230 congregations were present. The question, however, had older roots; the debate about and inquiry into registration had lasted for a decade.

== Board chairs ==
- 2003–2005: Valtter Luoto
- 2005–2009: Klaus Korhonen
- 2010: Vesa Pylvänäinen
- 2011–2015: Pekka Havupalo
- 2016: Usko Katto
- 2017–2020: Mika Yrjölä
- 2021: Helena Korhonen
- 2022–present: Kauko Uusila

== See also ==
- List of Pentecostal churches in Finland
