= Herunen =

Village in Uusimaa, Finland

Coordinates: 60°33′15.01″N 024°44′55.97″E

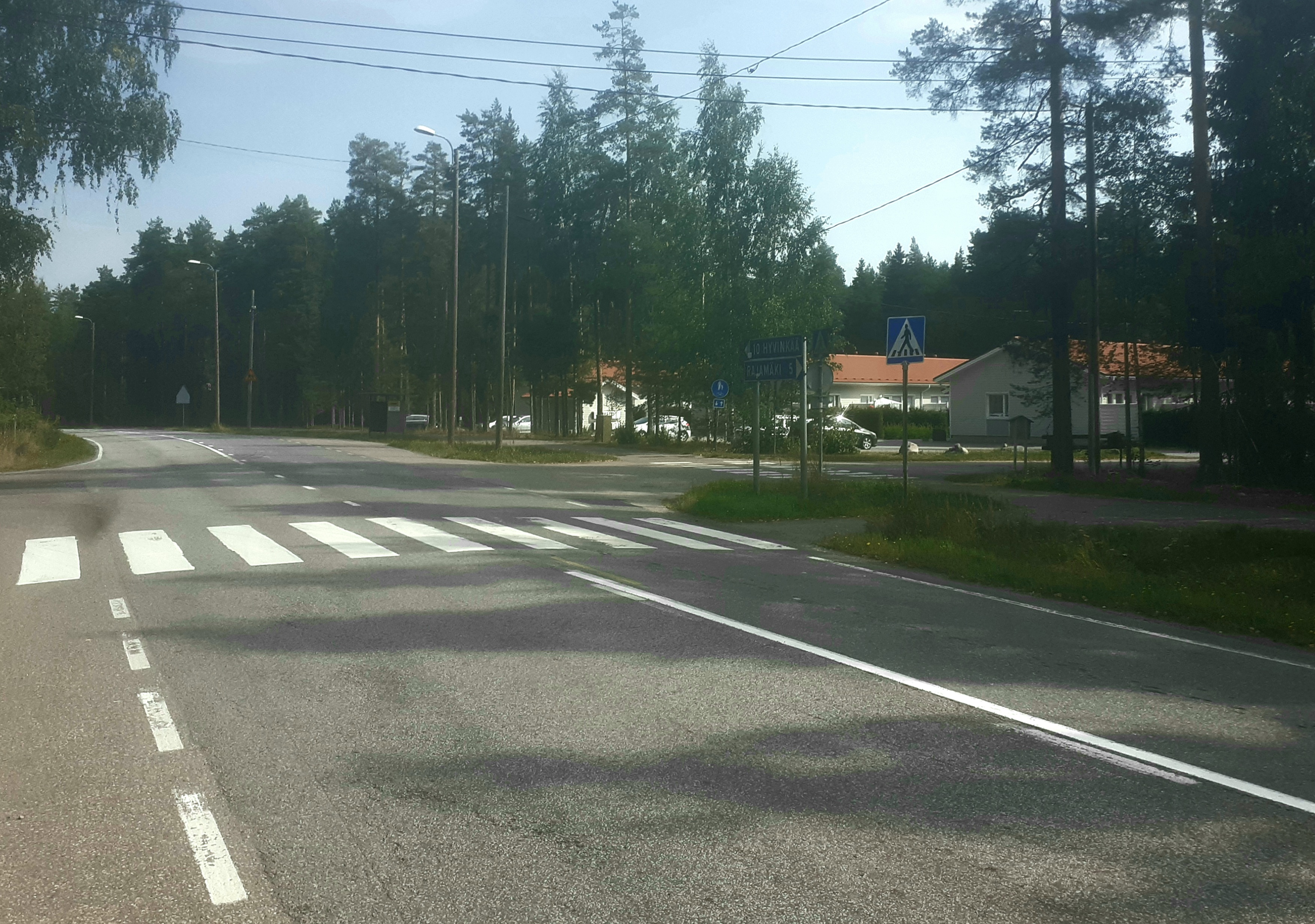
Herunen in August 2022

Herunen is a village in the northern part of the Nurmijärvi municipality in Uusimaa, Finland. At the end of 2011, there were 535 inhabitants in this small urban area, which crossed the municipal border between Nurmijärvi and Hyvinkää, of which 531 lived in Nurmijärvi and 4 in Hyvinkää. Herunen is located on Lohjanharju (part of the Salpausselkä), about 50 meters above sea level. From Herunen to the northeast towards Hyvinkää, the old Helsinki–Hämeenlinna highway and the current regional road 130, will meet. By the south, towards neighbouring village Rajamäki, you will meet Highway 25, along which you can get to Hanko and Hyvinkää.

The village does not have its own school and kindergarten, but the children attend school in Rajamäki. The Nurmijärvi parish rents the former Herunen's kiosk from the sports club, and organizes club activities at the kiosk. The hiking trails of the Kiljavannummi sports area leave next to the kiosk. It is about seven kilometers from the kiosk to the golf center in Kytäjä. During the spring and summer of 2018, a new full-scale 18-lane discgolf course was completed in the Herunen area and commissioned in the fall.

== See also ==
- Hyvinkäänkylä
- Kiljava
