= Palojoki =

Village in Nurmijärvi, Finland

Coordinates: 60°25.17029′N 24°52.3479′E

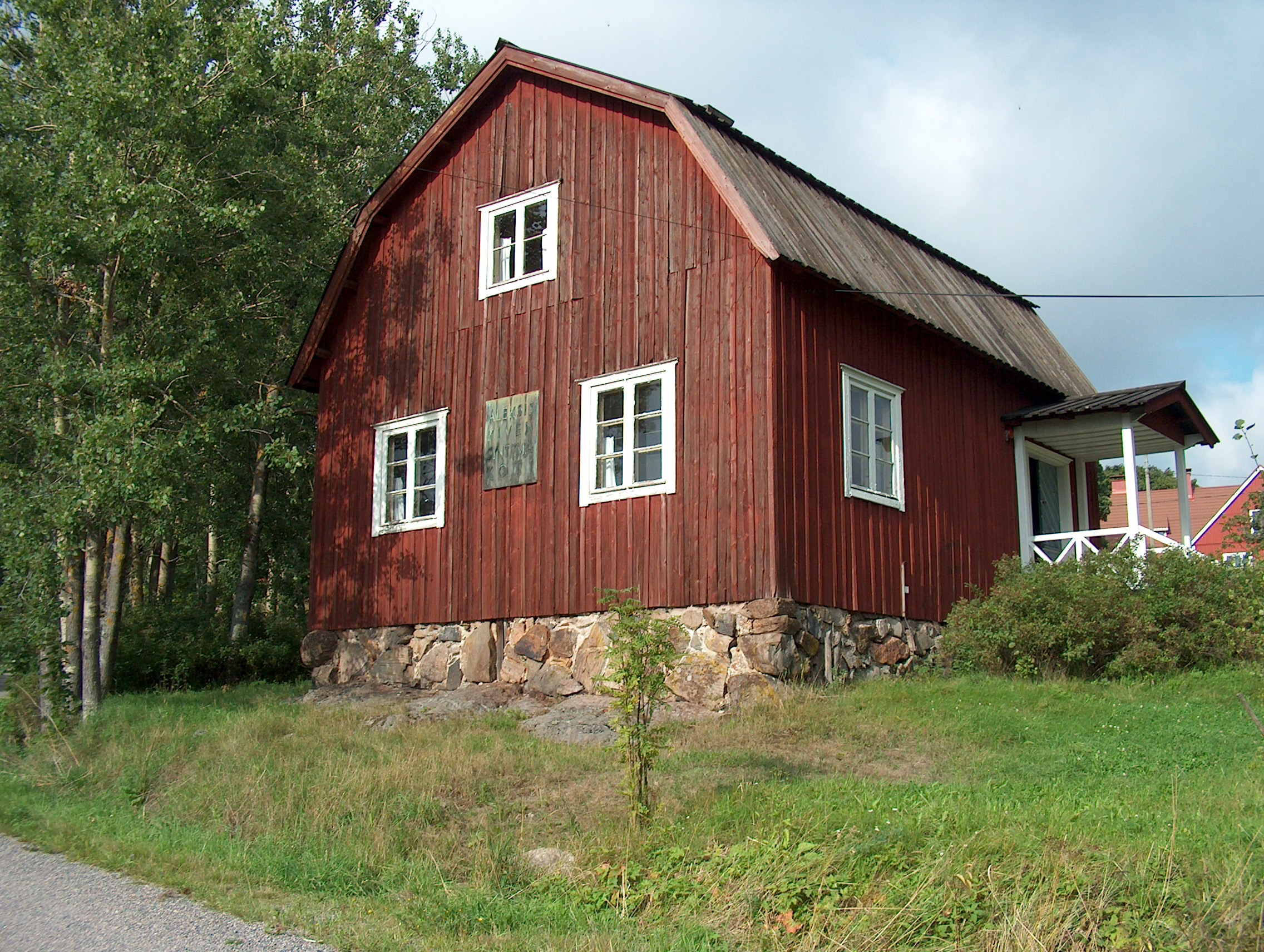
A birthplace of Aleksis Kivi in Palojoki

Palojoki (Finnish pronunciation: [ˈpɑloˌjoki]; literally "fire river") is a village of about a thousand inhabitants in Nurmijärvi, Finland. It is located close to the border of Tuusula, about 30 kilometers north of Helsinki, and the regional road 139 (Palojoentie on the Nurmijärvi side, Nahkelantie on the Tuusula side) runs from the Nurmijärvi's church village to Hyrylä, Tuusula. Klaukkala is 12 kilometres (7.5 mi) from Palojoki. The village has a primary school called Palojoki School (Palojoen koulu).

The village is named after the adjacent Palojoki River, which flows into the Vantaa River near the village. The area of the village is about 50 km^{2} and its highest point (Haukkaankallio) is about 50 m above sea level. Palojoki is home to one of the nationally significant built cultural environments defined by the Finnish Heritage Agency.

== Aleksis Kivi ==
The most famous resident of Palojoki is the Finnish national author Aleksis Kivi (1834–1872), whose birthplace currently serves as a museum. The Kivi Festival (Kivi-juhlat), which features plays by Aleksis Kivi, is held in the summer on Taaborinvuori in the village. Kivi describes his home village as follows:

My home village is called Palojoki, and it is the first village that will meet you on the road from Porvoo to Turku, after you have entered the Nurmijärvi area. By the way, I want to tell you in advance that Nurmijärvi, for the sake of nature rather than art, cannot offer you anything interesting: no views, no plateaus and valleys in romantic groupings; and yet these regions are the most wonderful to me on earth; such a power of enchantment is in the memories of childhood.

== See also ==
- Nukari

== Literature ==
- Tarja Raninen: Nummisuutareiden naapurit. Palojoen kyläyhdistys, Rusutjärvi: Reuna, 2013. ISBN 978-952-67804-5-0. (in Finnish)
