= Kiljava =

Village in Nurmijärvi, Finland

Coordinates: 60°30′N 24°40′E

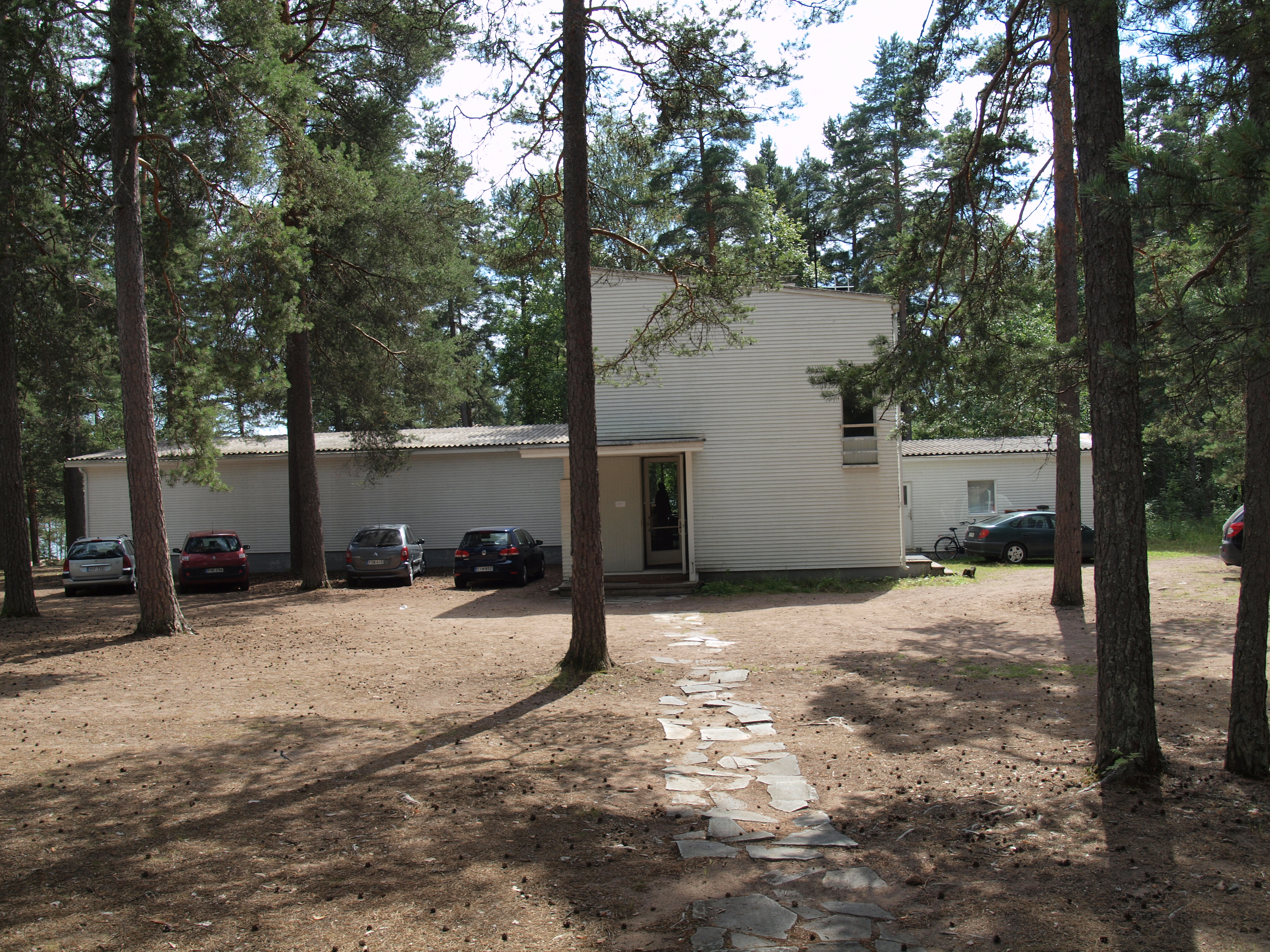
The Kiljava casino is one of the oldest buildings in Kiljava, dating from 1939

Kiljava is a village in the municipality of Nurmijärvi and Hyvinkää in southern Finland. It is located between villages of Rajamäki and Röykkä. Kiljava is most famous for its public, all-purpose educational institute (Kiljavan opisto in Finnish). It is also a popular vacation resort, with two private camping areas - one for SAFA architects and one for the Finnish Police Force - and a public beach on the shore of Lake Sääksi. In addition, Kiljava is home to a wooden casino designed by Hugo Harmia and established as early as 1939.

== See also ==
- Herunen
