= Nukari =

Village in Uusimaa, Finland

Coordinates: 60°32′N 24°55′E

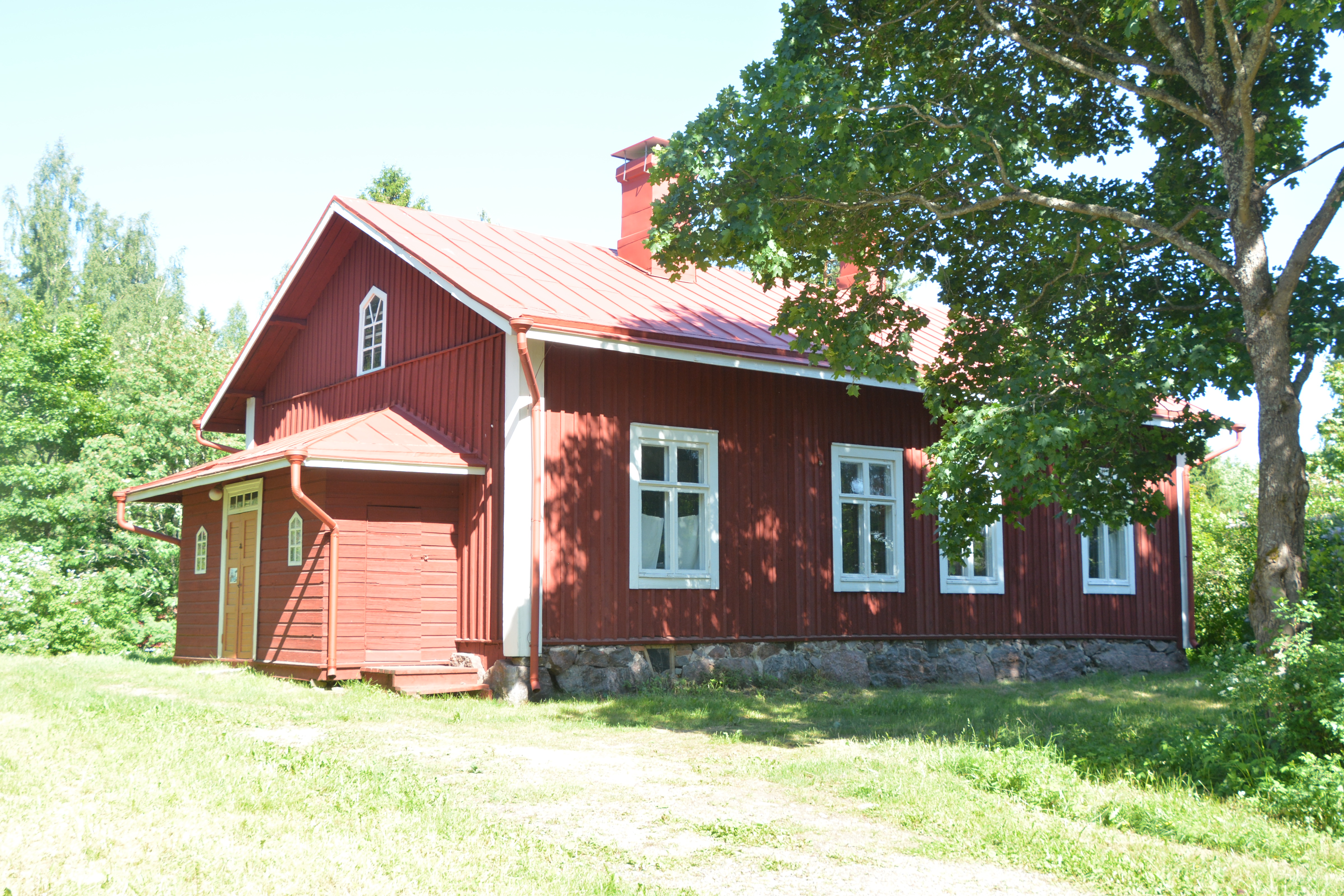
Nukari School Museum.

Nukari (Finnish pronunciation: [ˈnukɑri]; Swedish: Nuckars) is a village located in the northeast part of Nurmijärvi municipality of Finland, near the border of Tuusula municipality. The nearest neighboring village is Jokela, about 4 kilometers. Next to Nukari is the national road 45, which runs between Helsinki, Tuusula and Hyvinkää. The population of village is about 350 inhabitants.

The River Vantaa, which flows through Nukari, has probably brought settlement to Nukari already during the Stone Age. Indeed, three artifacts from the Stone Age have been found on Nukari; flat chisel, hammer ax and polished stone. During the Bronze Age the settlement disappeared, whereas in the Iron Age the whole Uusimaa was mainly hunting ground for Estonians and later for Tavastians. With the Crusades in Sweden, Nukari was once again populated.

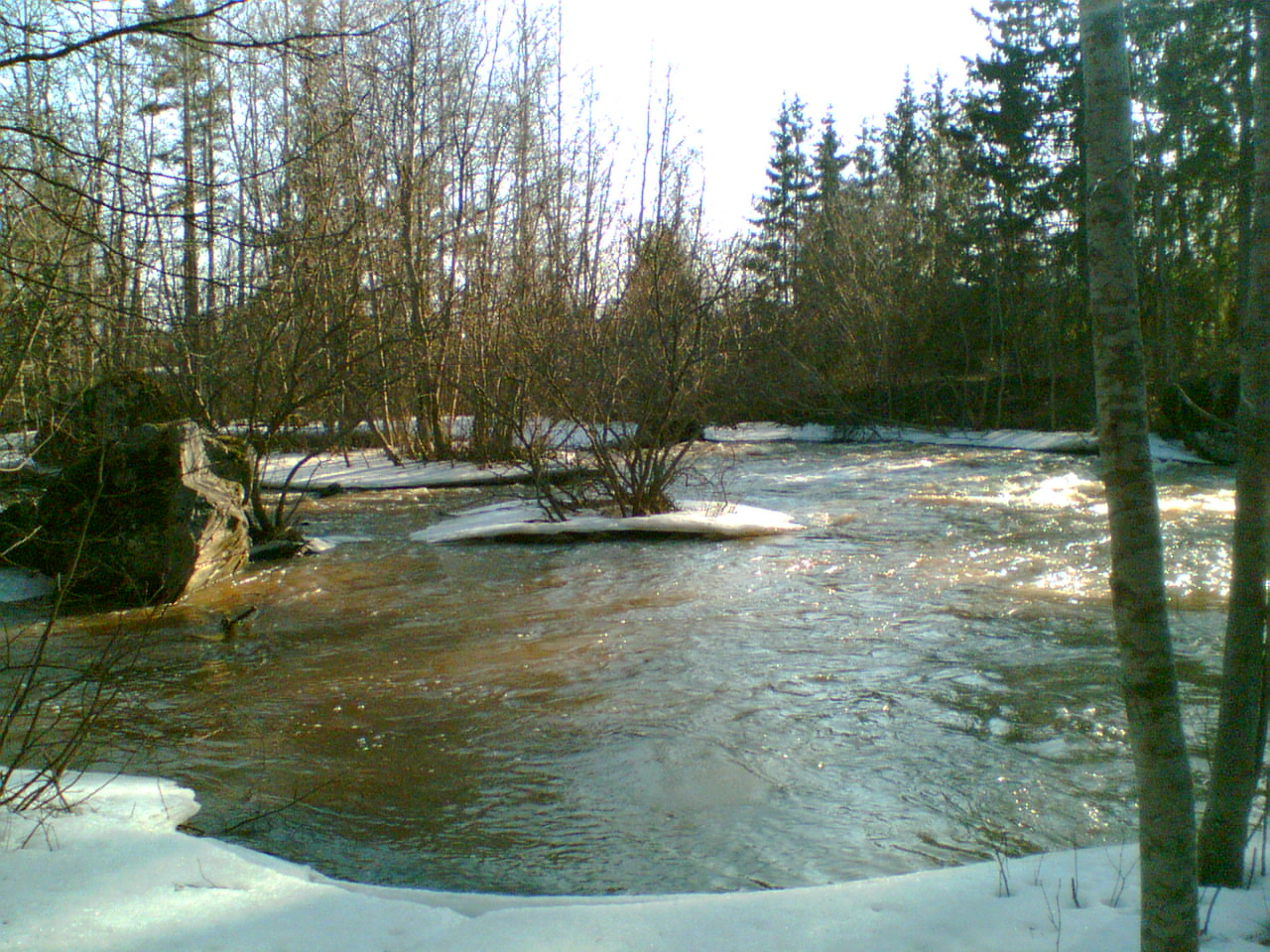
Nukarinkoski, a local rapids.

The bridge over the rapids called Nukarinkoski (or Pengerkoski) in River Vantaa and the road from Helsinki to Hyvinkää (current MT 45), required constant caretakers in the 1650s. Burgess Erkki Nukari declared himself a keen bridge guard if he could get space in the nearby forest area. In 1662, Governor Ernst Johan Creutz granted Erkki Nukar the rights to the wilderness of East Vantaa, the area of the present Nukari village. Nukari founded a permanent tavern and can be considered the first real farmer in Vantaa.

Nukarinkoski has also played an important role in the industrialization of Nukari village. As early as the end of the 16th century, a watermill was built on the rapids and by the 1660s there were already two mills. In addition, sawmills were built along the rapids, and in the 20th century, a lumber factory operated alongside another mill. The Nurmijärvi Municipal Power Plant planned to build a power plant in Nukarinkoski at the turn of the 1920s, but it had to be abandoned due to high costs. Nukarinkoski was used for log driving in the 1920s and 1950s.

The first volksschule in Nurmijärvi (now the Nukari School Museum) started its operations in 1873. The school was founded by Matilda Adlercreutz, the lady of Raala Manor. The lady found it important that the manor's workers, laborers, and crofters, and above all their children, received instruction and education. In the first fall, 41 students enrolled in the school. In 1900 the school was donated to the municipality.

Nukari has also a primary school and a kindergarten, and in the 1980s there were 2 village shops, a bank, a post office and a hairdressing salon. Nukari no longer has any grocery stores or kiosks, only one filling station. The nearest shops can be found in the neighboring village, Jokela.

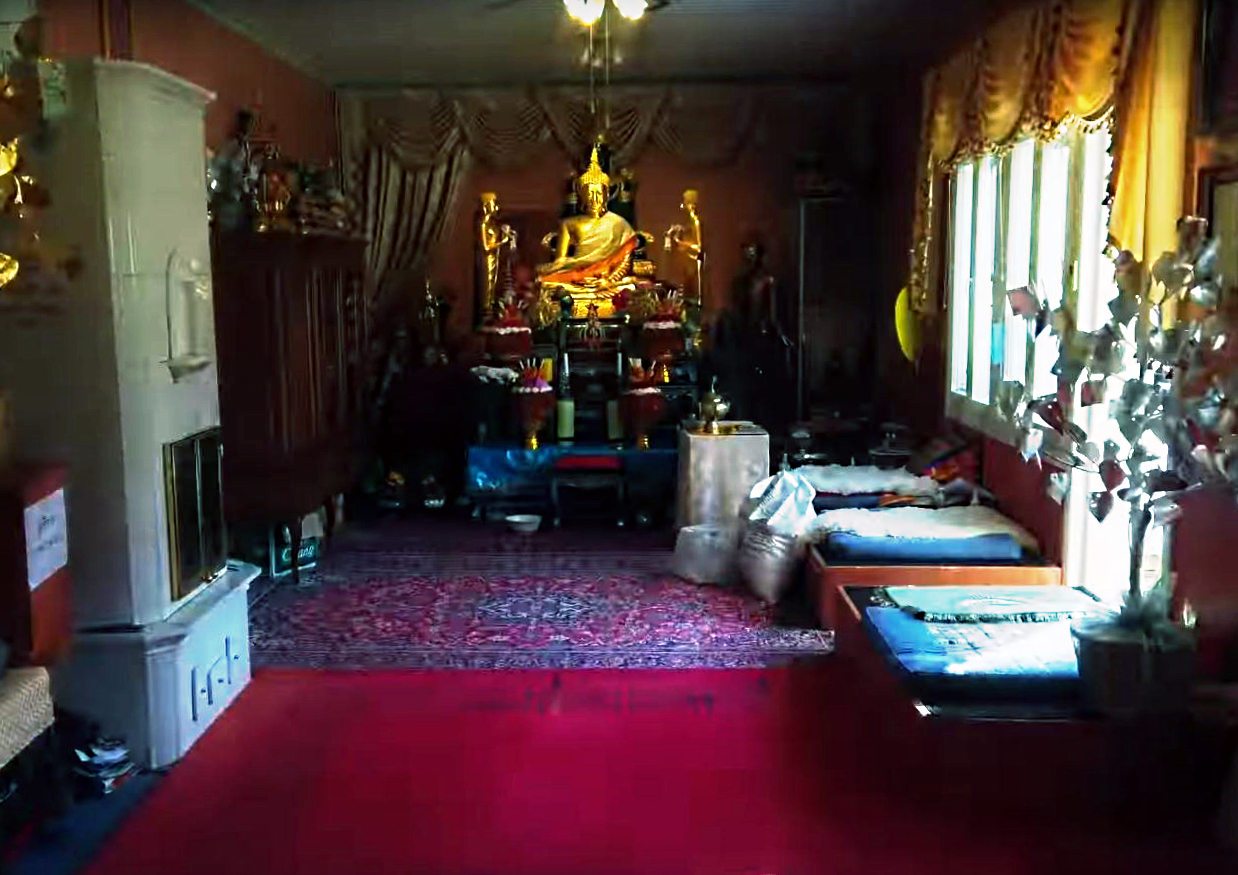
Interior of the Buddhist wat in Nukari

In 2009, the Finnish-Thai Buddhist Association bought a house in Nukari where a Thai Buddhist temple was established. In 2020, a new fine ceremony house was completed, which can accommodate 250 people, and in 2021, two bhikkhus (monks) and one novice will live in the Buddharama temple. The opening and inauguration of the new ceremonial house will not be held until 2022 due to the COVID-19 pandemic. At present, Nukari Temple is the largest of Finland's three Thai Buddhist temples.

== Distances from other cities ==
- Helsinki 45 km
- Järvenpää 15 km
- Tuusula 15 km
- Hyvinkää 14 km
- Nurmijärvi 11 km

== See also ==
- Palojoki

== Sources ==
- Heikkilä, Leena (2008). Pengerkosken partaalla. Nukarin tienoon historiaa ja tarinoita. Nukarin kylätoimikunta.
- Lastuja Vantaanjoen historiasta - Louis Belanger Vantaan- ja Tuusulanjoella vuonna 1798 (in Finnish)
