= Nurmijärvi Pentecostal Church =

- Nurmijärvi Pentecostal Congregation
- Finnish: Nurmijärven helluntaiseurakunta
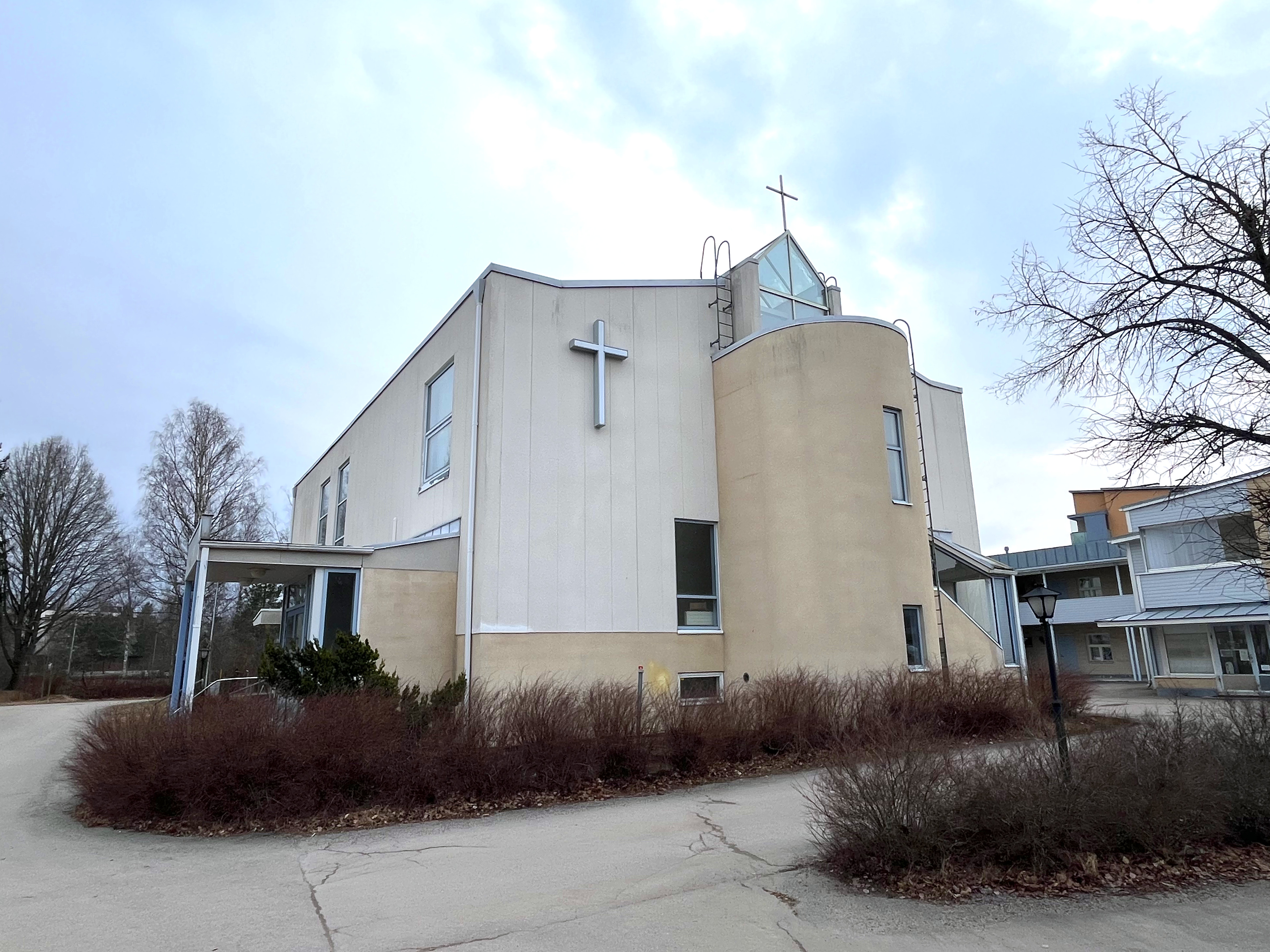
- Nurmijärvi Pentecostal Church
- 60°27′56.68″N 24°48′15.4″E
- Location: Nurmijärvi
- Country: Finland
- Website: www.nurmijarvenhelluntaisrk.fi

History
- Founded: 6 July 1987; 38 years ago

Architecture
- Architect: Veikko Gröhn

Administration
- Diocese: The Pentecostal Church of Finland

The Nurmijärvi Pentecostal Church (also known as the Nurmijärvi Pentecostal Congregation; Finnish: Nurmijärven helluntaiseurakunta) is a Finnish Pentecostal congregation in Nurmijärvi, Finland. It was founded in 1987 and it had about 200 members in 2025.

The congregation's activities include church services, prayer evenings, children's and youth work, and music activities. The congregation organizes food distribution, maintains a flea market, and publishes the Lähde magazine. The congregation has done missionary work among the Romani people in Ukraine and in Cuba. The congregation also has a Christian choir, Flow. The congregation broadcasts its events live, for example through the UskoTV service and on the television and online channels of TV7. The congregation also produces a program that is broadcast on Radio Dei.

== History ==
The Pentecostal revival first arrived in Nurmijärvi in the 1940s. In the 1970s, a prayer circle was established in Nurmijärvi, supported by the Pentecostal Church of Hyvinkää and the Saalem Church in Helsinki. An independent Pentecostal church was established on 7 June 1987, with Pentti Tarvonen as its first pastor. The building of the Nurmijärvi Pentecostal Church was completed in 1988 and it was designed by architect Veikko Gröhn.

== See also ==
- The Pentecostal Church of Finland
