= Pentecostal European Fellowship =

Federation of 60 pentecostal movements

- Abbreviation: PEF
- Classification: Evangelical Christianity
- Theology: Pentecostalism
- Associations: Pentecostal World Fellowship; Fellowship of European International Churches
- Headquarters: Sint-Genesius-Rode, Belgium
- Origin: 1987
- Official website: www.pef.eu

Pentecostal European Fellowship is a federation of 60 pentecostal movements across Europe. The headquarters is in Sint-Genesius-Rode, Belgium.

The Pentecostal European Fellowship is a co-operation platform for Pentecostal leaders in Europe. Every year the PEF organizes a leaders’ conference for fellowship, a major city-wide IMPACT outreach and an annual Europe Prayer Sunday.

Pentecostal European Fellowship is one of four main regional church bodies in Europe.

== History ==
The Pentecostal European Fellowship (PEF) was formed in 1987 during the Pentecostal European Conference (PEC) in Lisbon (Portugal) as a merge of European Pentecostal Fellowship and Pentecostal European Conference. In 2005, the PEF adopted a Constitution and received legal recognition in Belgium as an international non-profit association. In the same year PEF opened its head office in the Brussels area. Every year the PEF organizes a leaders’ conference for fellowship, a major city-wide IMPACT outreach and an annual Europe Prayer Sunday.

The significant growth and expansion of the charmismatic movement has further contributed to a number of national dialogues involving Pentecostal churches throughout Europe.
