= Rajamäki (village) =

Village in Uusimaa, Finland

Coordinates: 60°31′30″N 024°45′41″E

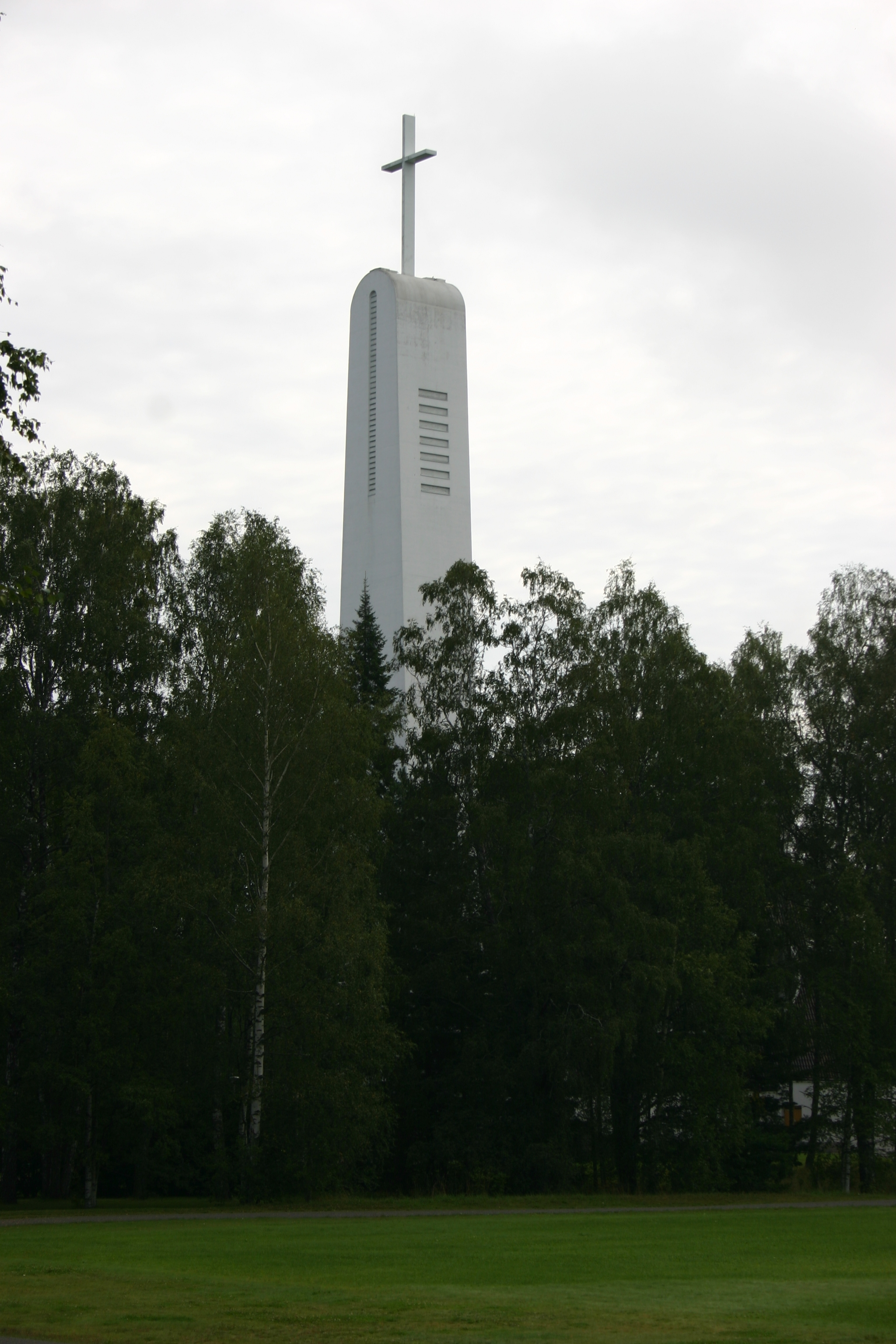
Rajamäki church, Erkki Huttunen 1938

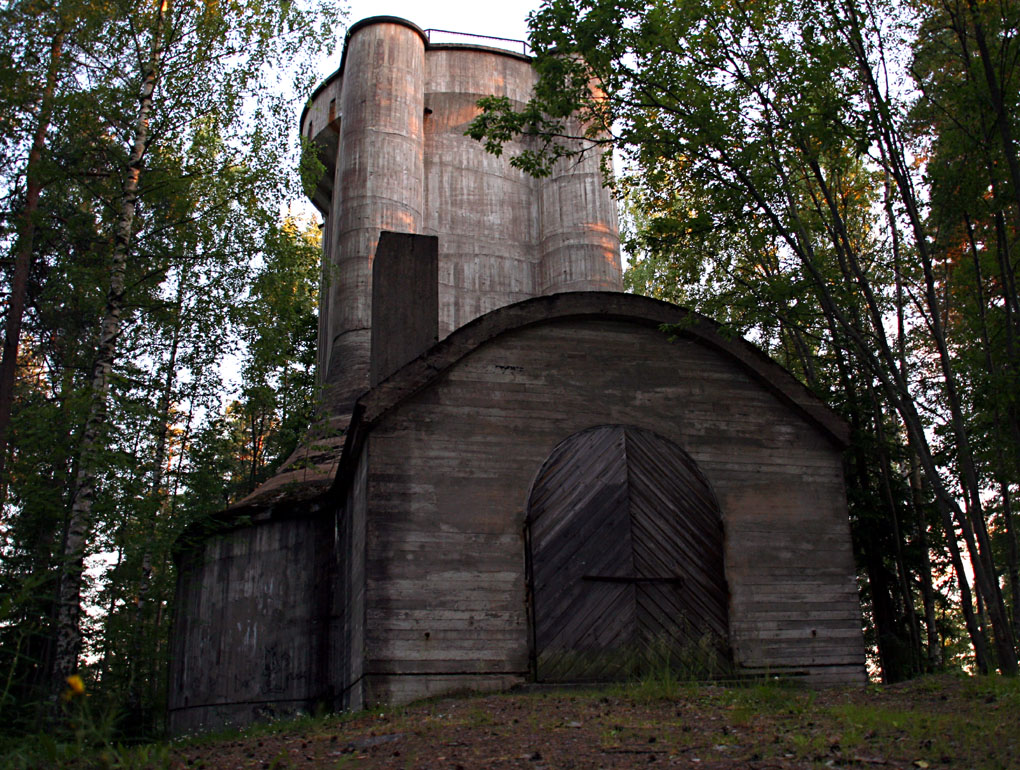
Anti-aircraft artillery Flak tower in Rajamäki that was constructed during the Winter War of 1939–1940. There was a distillery near this Flak tower.

Rajamäki (Finnish: [ˈrɑjɑˌmæki]; literally translated "border hill") is a village in the municipality of Nurmijärvi in southern Finland. Rajamäki is located 45 kilometres (28 mi) north of the capital Helsinki and has a population of around 7,500 inhabitants. Formerly, Rajamäki was the largest of Nurmijärvi's villages, until in the 1970s Klaukkala grew larger than Rajamäki. It is 8 kilometres (5.0 mi) from Rajamäki to the center of Nurmijärvi.

Rajamäki is best known for its alcohol distillery which was established in 1888 because of the fresh and pure water found in the area. The distillery was a part of the old Finnish alcohol monopoly Alko and is now part of the Altia corporation. Dilution and bottling of Koskenkorva Viina, distilled in the distillery in Koskenkorva, Ilmajoki, is done in Rajamäki. During the Winter War, the factory produced around 500,000 Molotov cocktails with the word "Rajamäki" inscribed on the bottle cap.

Rajamäki has an elementary school and a high school which is focused on the sport of floorball as many of Finland's top young players live in the area. Lähde, the business center for the grocery stores, restaurants, and other services opened in Rajamäki on Thursday October 11, 2018.

The Hanko–Hyvinkää railway passes through Rajamäki which tends to boost the businesses of the village.

== See also ==
- Herunen, a neighbouring village near Rajamäki
- Kiljava, a neighbouring village near Rajamäki
