= Nurmijärvi =

Municipality in Uusimaa, Finland

- Municipality
- Nurmijärven kunta Nurmijärvi kommun
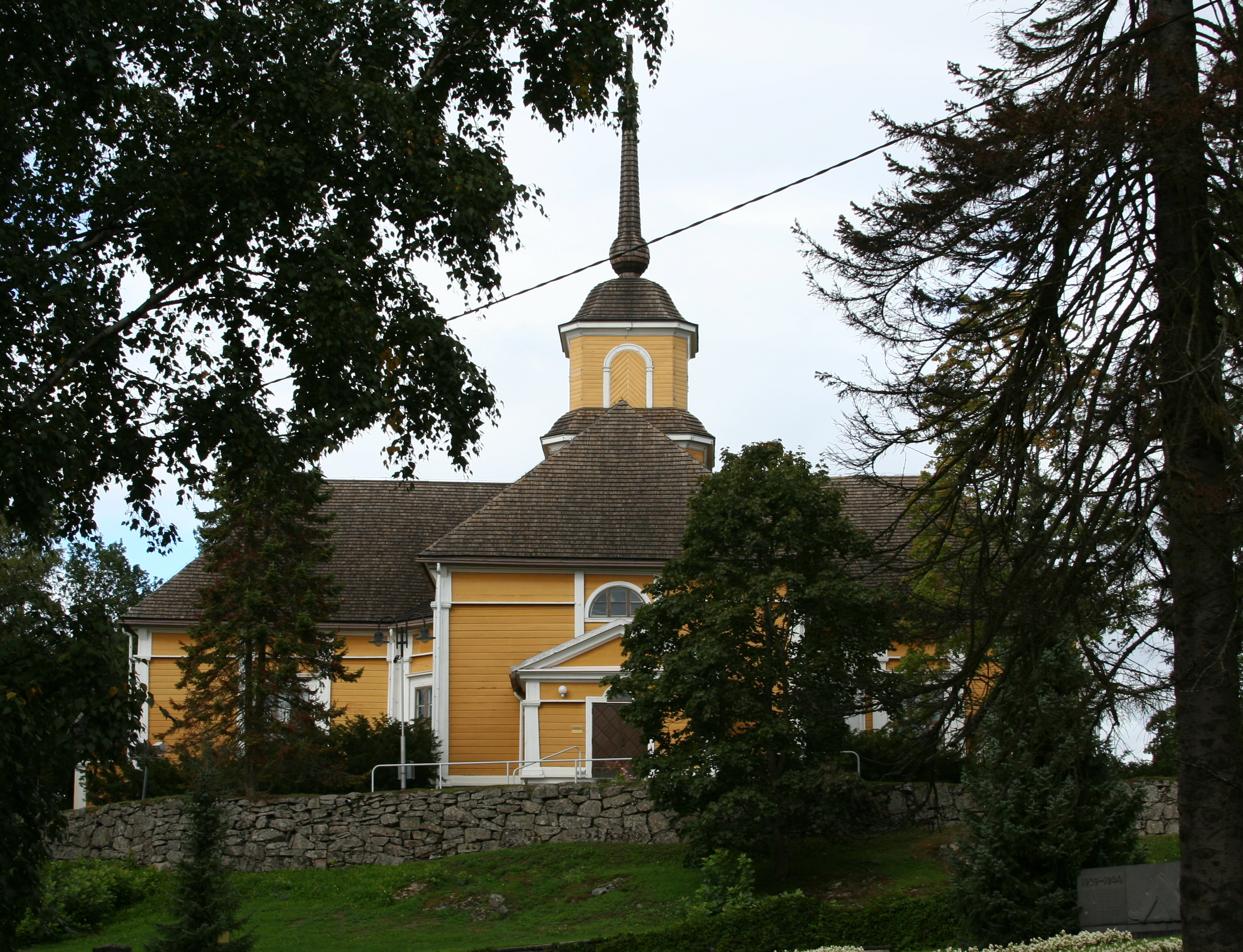
- Nurmijärvi church

- Coat of arms

- Location of Nurmijärvi in Finland
- Interactive map of Nurmijärvi
- Coordinates: 60°28′N 024°48.5′E
- Country: Finland
- Region: Uusimaa
- Sub-region: Helsinki sub-region
- Metropolitan area: Helsinki metropolitan area
- Charter: 1605
- Seat: Nurmijärvi (Kirkonkylä)
- Villages: Klaukkala, Rajamäki, Röykkä

Government
  - Municipal manager: Outi Mäkelä

Area (2018-01-01)
  - Total: 367.26 km^{2} (141.80 sq mi)
  - Land: 361.9 km^{2} (139.7 sq mi)
  - Water: 5.4 km^{2} (2.1 sq mi)
  - Rank: 211th largest in Finland

Population (2025-12-31)
  - Total: 45,333
  - Rank: 26th largest in Finland
  - Density: 125.26/km^{2} (324.4/sq mi)

Population by native language
  - Finnish: 90.4% (official)
  - Swedish: 1.3%
  - Others: 8.4%

Population by age
  - 0 to 14: 19.8%
  - 15 to 64: 63.2%
  - 65 or older: 17%
- Time zone: UTC+02:00 (EET)
  - Summer (DST): UTC+03:00 (EEST)
- Climate: Dfb
- Website: www.nurmijarvi.fi

Nurmijärvi (Finnish pronunciation: [ˈnurmiˌjærʋi]) is a municipality in Finland, located in the southern interior of the country. Nurmijärvi is situated in the Uusimaa region. The population of Nurmijärvi is approximately 45,000. It is the 26th most populous municipality in Finland and the most populous municipality without city status (Finnish: kaupunki). Nurmijärvi is part of the Helsinki metropolitan area, which has approximately 1.62 million inhabitants.

Nurmijärvi is located 37 kilometres (23 mi) north of the capital, Helsinki. Nurmijärvi's neighbouring municipalities are Espoo, Vantaa, Tuusula, Hyvinkää and Vihti. In recent decades, Nurmijärvi has been one of the fastest growing municipalities in the Helsinki Metropolitan Area and in Finland as a whole because of its proximity to Helsinki. The municipality does not have a single clear residential settlement, but is divided into mainly four areas: the largest urban area in the southern part of the municipality, Klaukkala (over 20,000 inhabitants); the administrative centre of the municipality, Nurmijärvi (almost 8,000 inhabitants); the northern settlement of Rajamäki (over 7,000 inhabitants); and the small settlement of Röykkä (over 1,500 inhabitants) in the northwestern part.

Nurmijärvi literally means "lawn lake" although the lake that gave the municipality its name was drained in the early 20th century and is now nothing more than some flat fields near the village centre. Nurmijärvi is one of three municipalities in the Uusimaa region that does not have a Swedish name, the others being Askola and Mäntsälä.

== History ==
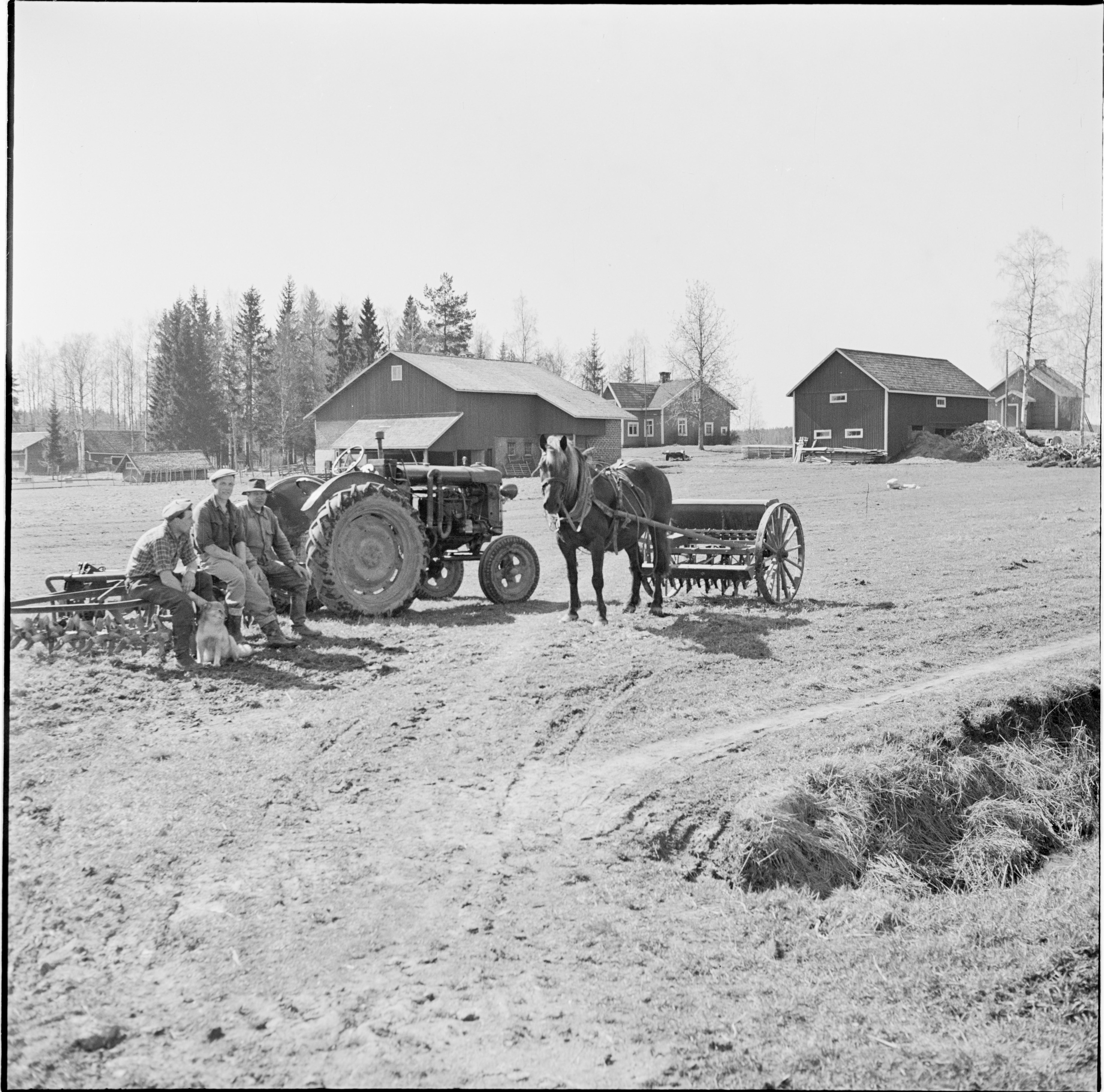
Like many other rural communities, one of Nurmijärvi's most important sources of income has always been agriculture. The picture is from 1954 in Nurmijärvi.

The area of what is now Nurmijärvi was inhabited in prehistoric times, indicated by archaeological finds dating back to 4500–3500 BC. At the start of the Middle Ages there was no permanent settlement in the area, but later settlement spread from both Tavastia and the coast, such that in 1540 there were 15 villages with 115 houses.

Administratively, Nurmijärvi has been formed by combining areas of Loppi, Vihti and Helsinki parishes. The earliest documentary mention of Nurmijärvi dates back to 1488, when the village of Uotila was mentioned. According to the land register of 1539, Nurmijärvi had 15 villages with a total of 113 houses. An independent congregation had already been formed in 1605 and the administrative parish of Nurmijärvi was formed in 1775, when the area had a population of 1471.

The first church in Nurmijärvi (likely St. Martin's Church, mentioned in 1565) was built at the end of the Middle Ages. It was demolished to give way to a new church, completed in 1692, and the present church, completed in 1793 and designed by Matti Åkerblom, is the third in order.

Nurmijärvi has long been a strong agricultural parish, and the share of fields in the total municipal area is almost one third, which is more than in many other municipalities in Finland. Horticultural crops have also been heavily cultivated and, for example, almost half of the wild cabbage harvest in Finland is produced in Nurmijärvi. Nevertheless, the municipality has not carried out further processing of agricultural products; for example, there has been no dairy.

The first industrial plants were born in the late 19th century, including Finland's first pharmaceutical factory founded by pharmacist Albin Koponen in Nurmijärvi in 1899. The main products of the drug plant were filizine extracted from male fern root rhizomes, which were sold as Diphyllobothrium latum and cestoda medicines called Filisin and Filicon. The factory-produced filicin was sold encapsulated all the way to China and America. Today, trade, transport and other services account for two thirds, industry and construction for less than one third and agriculture for over 3% of the population. The largest individual employers are Altia Oyj and Teknos Oy in Rajamäki, Polimoon Oy in Klaukkala and Korsisaari Oy.

In the early 1960s, the settlement of Nurmijärvi was evenly distributed in different parts of the municipality. However, migration to Nurmijärvi began to accelerate around the middle of the decade and the focus of settlement shifted to the southern parts of the municipality. Already in 1970 the majority (65%) of the inhabitants of Nurmijärvi lived in urban settlements. The largest agglomerations at that time were Klaukkala (3,500 inhabitants), Rajamäki (3,400 inhabitants) and church village (2,800 inhabitants). Of these, the growth of Klaukkala and church village, in particular, has been based almost exclusively on the vicinity of the Helsinki metropolitan area. The most prominent farms on Lake Nurmijärvi have been the manors of Numlahti and Raala. Before the departure of Hyvinkää in 1917, the Kytäjä Manor as well as the whole of the Kytäjä village, were part of the Nurmijärvi parish.

The measuring instruments of the Finnish Meteorological Institute located in Nurmijärvi were the first to detect the rising radiation levels caused by the Chernobyl disaster on Sunday, April 27, 1986, the day after the disaster.

== Geography ==
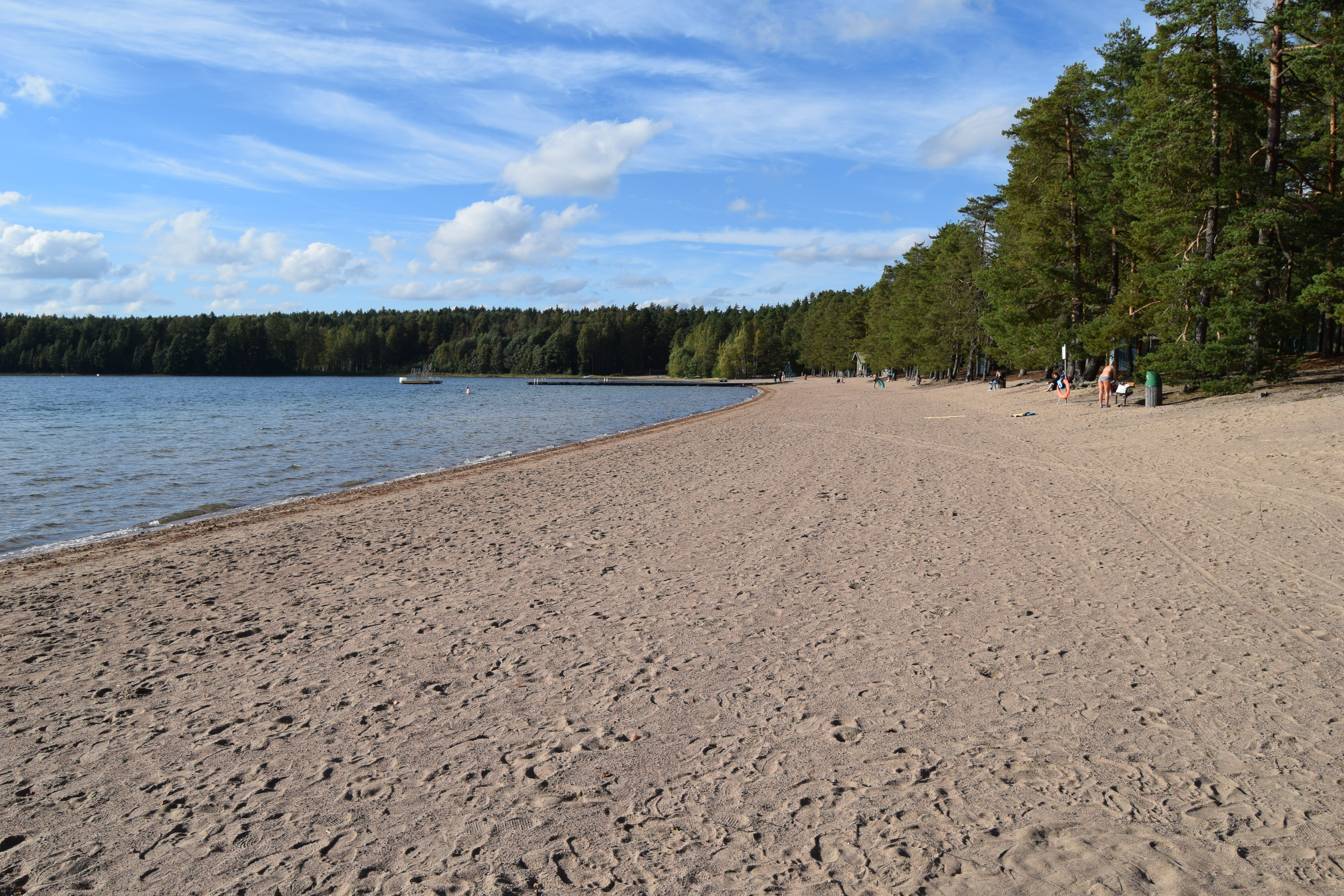
Lake Sääksi beach.

Nurmijärvi is located in the central part of Uusimaa. Salpausselkä passes through the northern part of the municipality via Röykkä, Kiljava and Rajamäki, and the River Vantaa flows through the Nukari and Palojoki rivers in the eastern part of the municipality. Nurmijärvi's lowest terrain is in the Luhtajoki valley at Klaukkala and the highest in Salpausselkä near Herunen.

There are few watercourses in the Nurmijärvi area. The municipality is located along the middle course of the River Vantaa and there are two large rapids, the Nukarinkoski and the Myllykoski. The Kuhakoski rapids, located in the village of Perttula and flowing into Lake Valkjärvi, is also significant in terms of industrial history and at the same time a popular attraction with its waterfall. The River Vantaa is joined by the Palojoki River from Hyvinkää and Tuusula, near the Palojoki village. The Lepsämä River and the Luhtajoki River flowing in the southern part of the municipality join the Vantaa town side near the Keimola village before joining the River Vantaa. The largest lake in Nurmijärvi is the Lake Sääksi (which is partly situated on the northwest side of Hyvinkää), which is known for one of the most popular beaches in Finland, being located in the Kiljava village. The other lakes are Lake Vaaksi near Röykkä and Lake Valkjärvi between Klaukkala and Perttula.

=== Villages ===
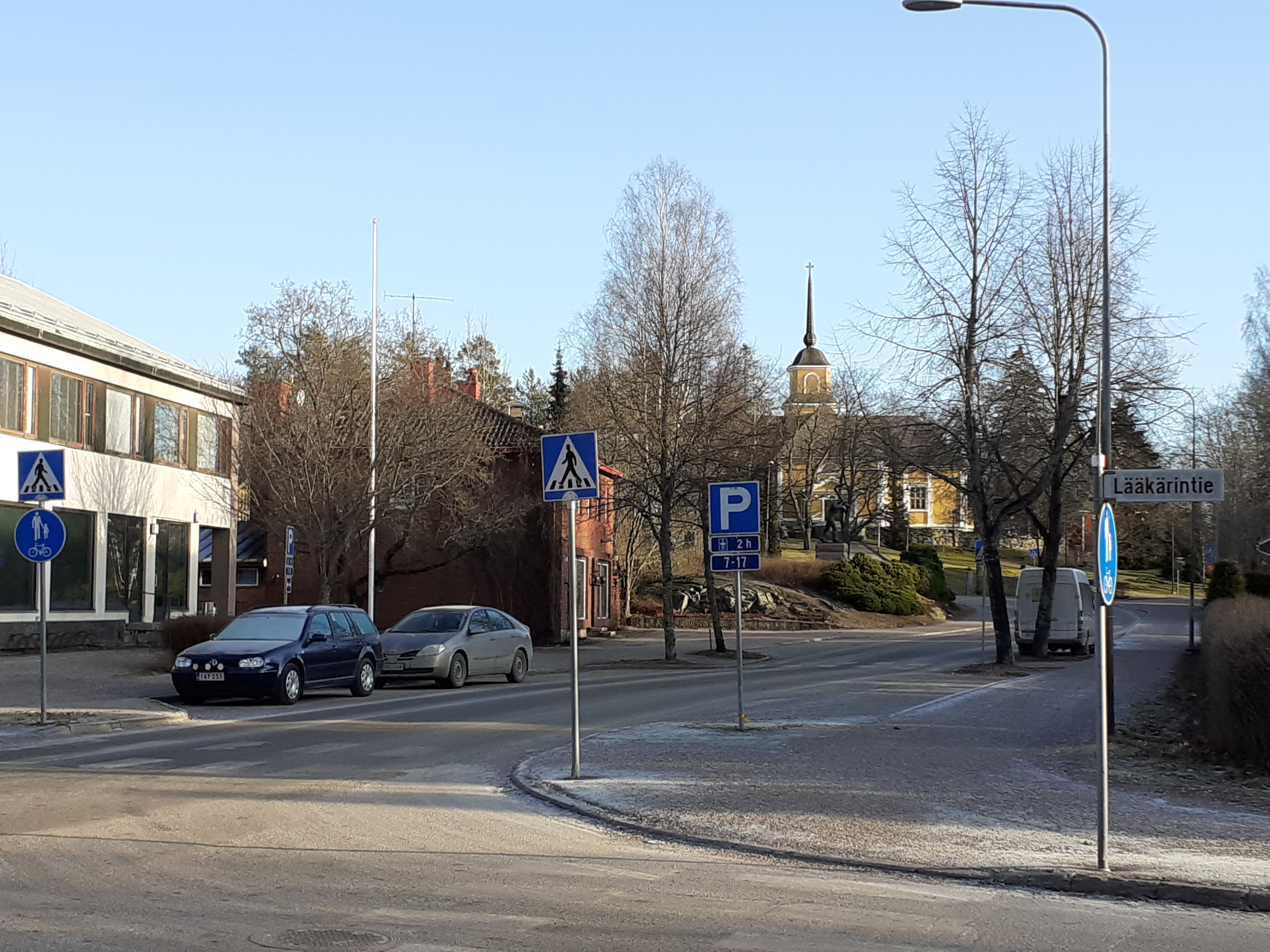
Aleksis Kiven tie, one of the main streets of Nurmijärvi's centre in January 2020.

Herunen, Järventausta, Kiljava, Klaukkala, Leppälampi, Lepsämä, Luhtajoki, Metsäkylä, Nukari, Numlahti, Nummenpää, Nurmijärvi (Kirkonkylä), Palojoki, Perttula, Raala, Rajamäki, Röykkä, Suomies, Uotila, Valkjärvi

=== Urban areas ===
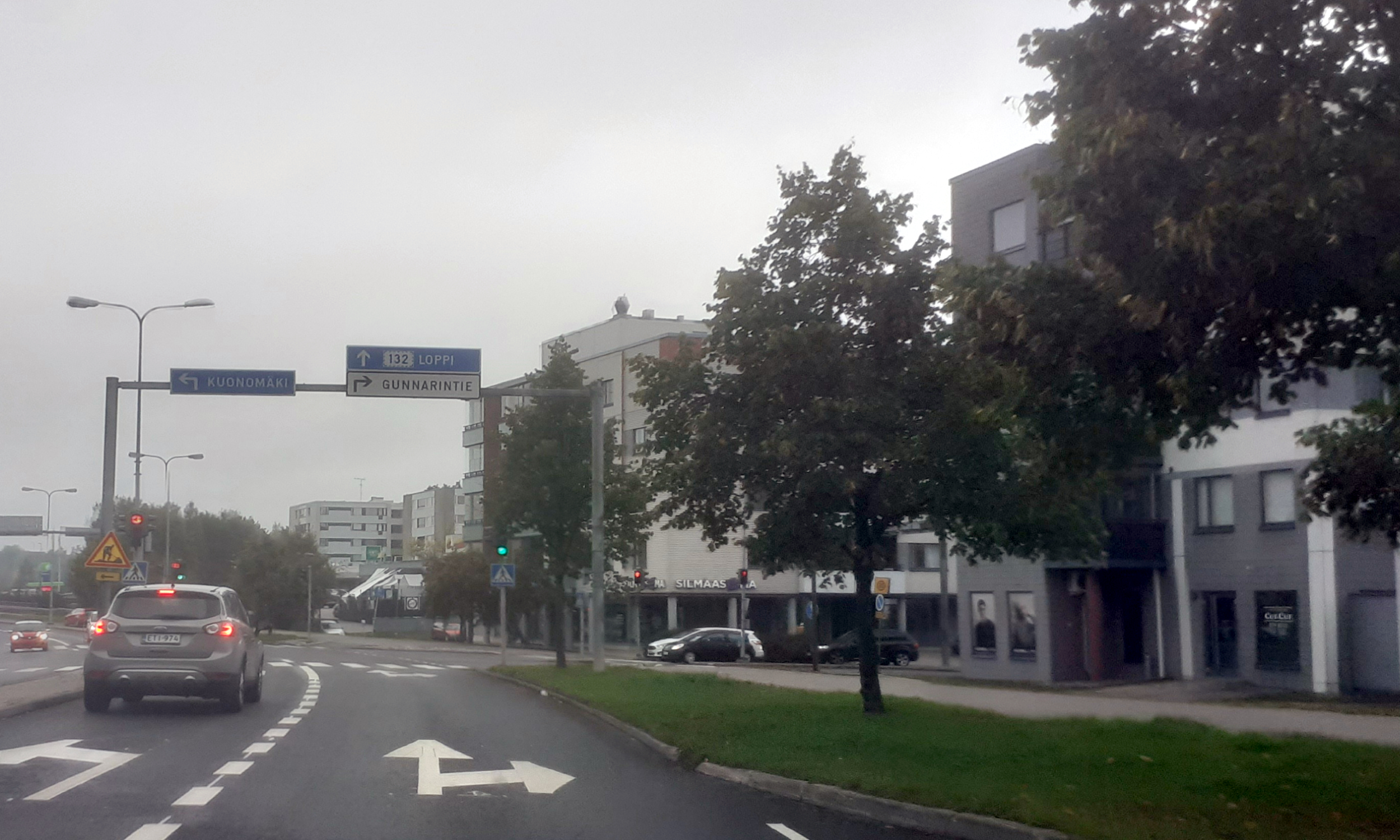
The centre of Klaukkala, the largest urban area of the municipality.

Table of the all statistical urban areas of the municipality. The administrative centre is in bold.

#	Urban area	Population (31 December 2020)
1	Klaukkala	20,683
2	**Nurmijärvi** (Kirkonkylä)	7,773
3	Rajamäki	7,494
4	Röykkä	1,593
5	Nukari	346
6	Palojoki	331
7	Leppälampi	272

== Demographics ==
Historical population
Year	Pop.	±%
1950	11,019	—
1960	13,461	+22.2%
1970	16,899	+25.5%
1980	22,115	+30.9%
1990	28,129	+27.2%
2000	33,104	+17.7%
2010	39,937	+20.6%
2020	43,663	+9.3%
Source: Doria, Statistics Finland

The municipality of Nurmijärvi has 45,333 inhabitants, making it the 26th most populous municipality in Finland. The municipality of Nurmijärvi is part of the Helsinki metropolitan area, which is the largest urban area in Finland with 1,623,283 inhabitants.

=== Immigration ===
Population by country of birth (2025)
Country of birth	Population	%
Finland	41,790	92.2
Estonia	1,115	2.5
Soviet Union	489	1.1
Sweden	237	0.5
Thailand	110	0.2
Ukraine	91	0.2
Russia	90	0.2
Turkey	86	0.2
Romania	78	0.2
Philippines	74	0.2
Other	1,263	2.8

In Nurmijärvi, 7% of the population has a foreign background, which is below the national average.

=== Religion ===
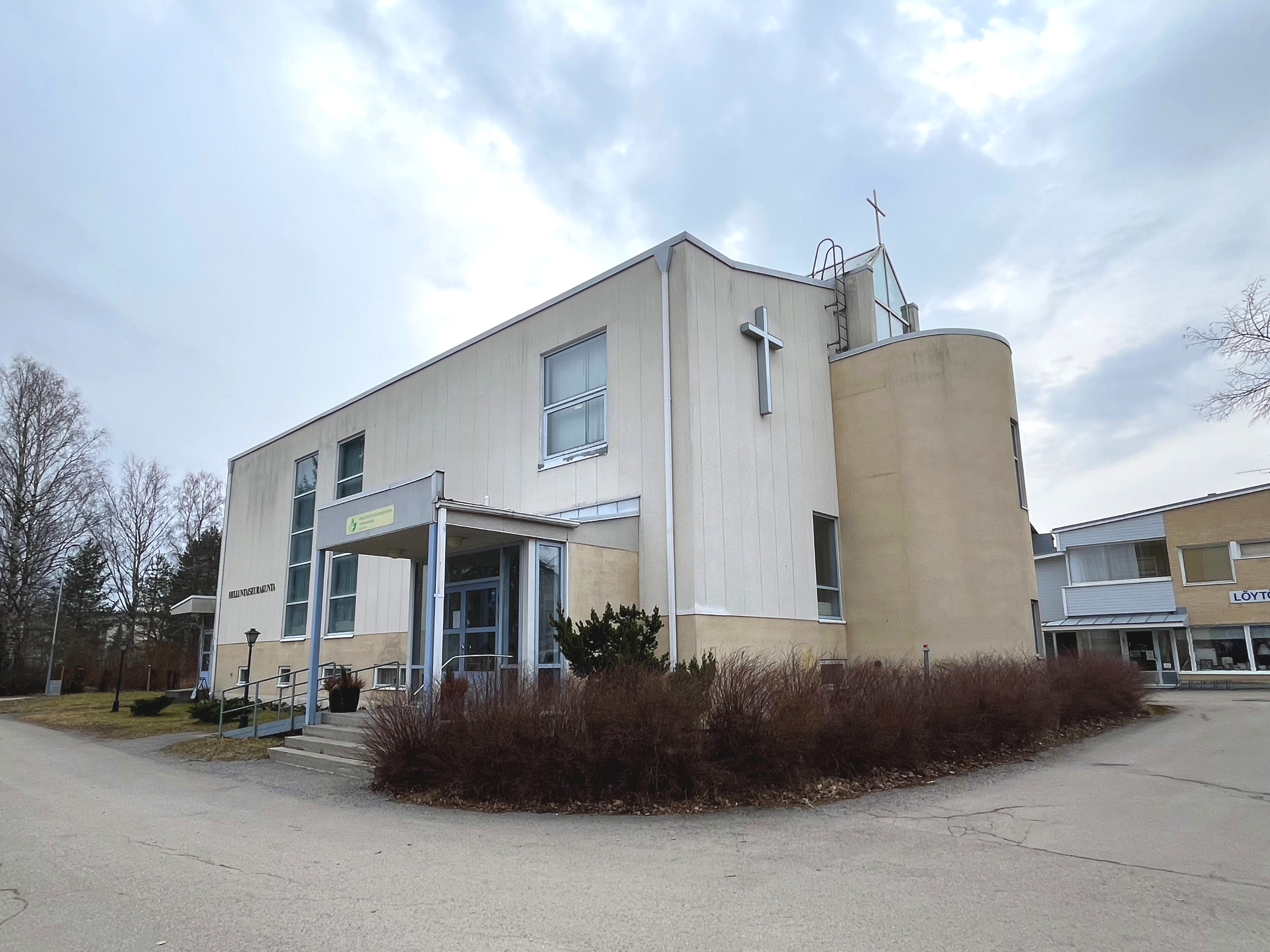
The Nurmijärvi Pentecostal Church in 2025

63.9% of Nurmijärvi's residents belong to the Evangelical Lutheran Church of Finland, compared to 63.6% nationwide (2023). 2.3% of the population belong to other religious denominations, and 33.8% of the population are unaffiliated. The Nurmijärvi parish, which is part of the Diocese of Espoo, is part of the Evangelical Lutheran Church of Finland.

Among the revival movements, the Conservative Laestadianism movement is represented by the Nurmijärvi Peace Association, which has over 490 members and whose office building, built in 1996, is located in Perttula. The Nurmijärvi Pentecostal Congregation, with approximately 200 members, operates in the area of the Pentecostal revival. Of the congregations of the Orthodox Church of Finland, the Helsinki Orthodox Parish operates in the Nurmijärvi area, and the only Orthodox church in Nurmijärvi is the St. Nectarios Church in Klaukkala.

In 2009, the Finnish-Thai Buddhist Association bought a house in Nukari where a Thai Buddhist temple was established, making it the largest of Finland's three Thai Buddhist temples.

== Government ==
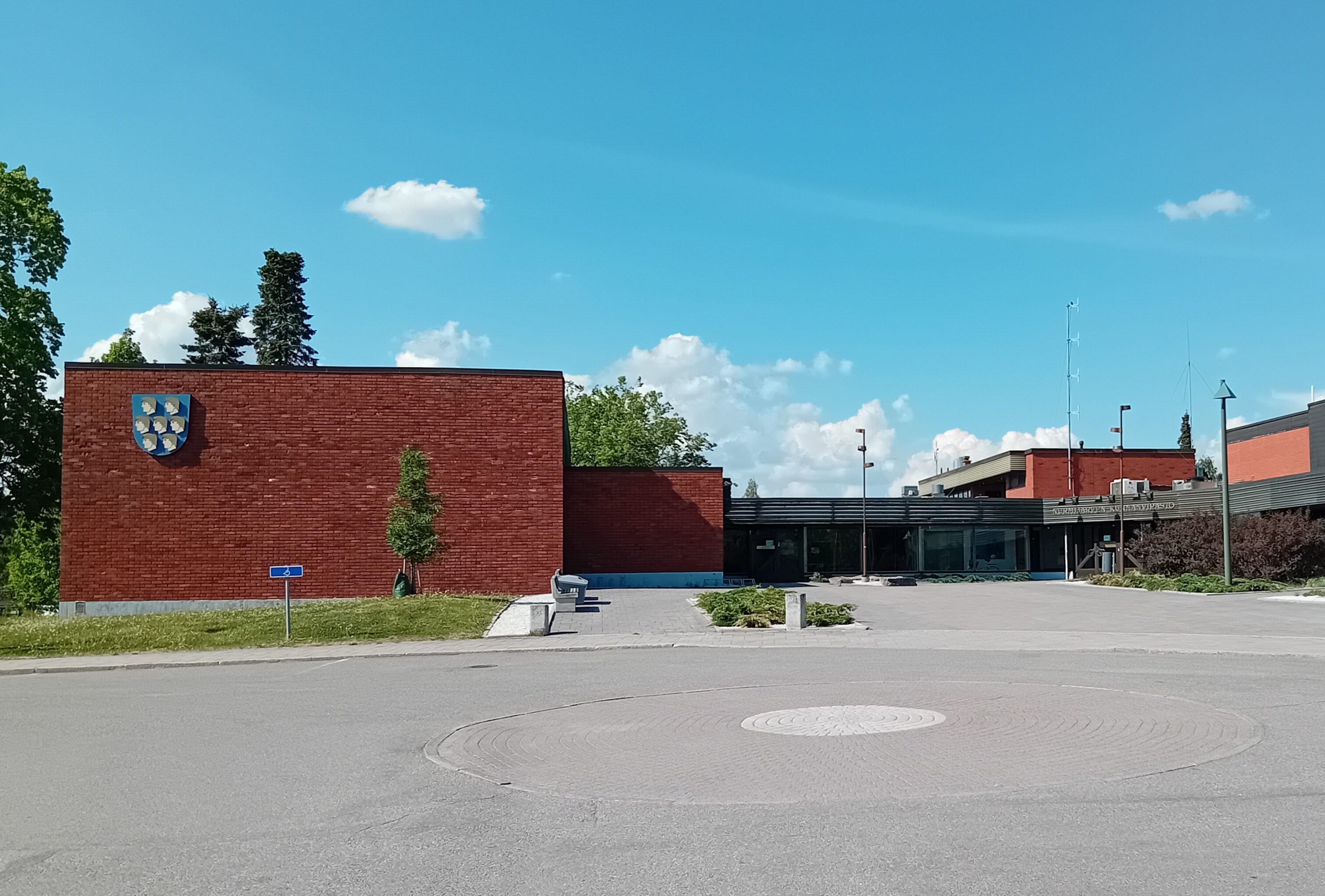
Nurmijärvi town hall

The municipality of Nurmijärvi belongs to the Uusimaa constituency. Nurmijärvi Municipal Council has 51 members; the chairman of the municipal board is Virpi Räty and the municipal council is Kallepekka Toivonen. The current municipal manager of Nurmijärvi is Outi Mäkelä; the previous manager, Kimmo Behm, retired on 1 May 2018.

=== Politics ===
Results of the 2019 Finnish parliamentary election in Nurmijärvi:

- National Coalition Party 25.9%
- Finns Party 25.2%
- Social Democratic Party 17.3%
- Centre Party 9.4%
- Green League 5.6%
- Movement Now 4.9%
- Christian Democrats 4.3%
- Left Alliance 2.9%
- Swedish People's Party of Finland 1.4%
- Freedom Alliance 1.1%

== Culture ==
Nurmijärvi is best known as the birthplace of Finland's national author, Aleksis Kivi. The coat of arms of municipality refers to his most famous literal work, Seitsemän veljestä (literally translated "the seven brothers") from 1870. Every year, the municipality hosts the Kivi Festival (Kivi-juhlat), the main venue of which is the Taaborinvuori museum area next to Aleksis Kivi's birthplace. On January 29, 2020, Nurmijärvi declared itself officially the Capital of Aleksis Kivi.

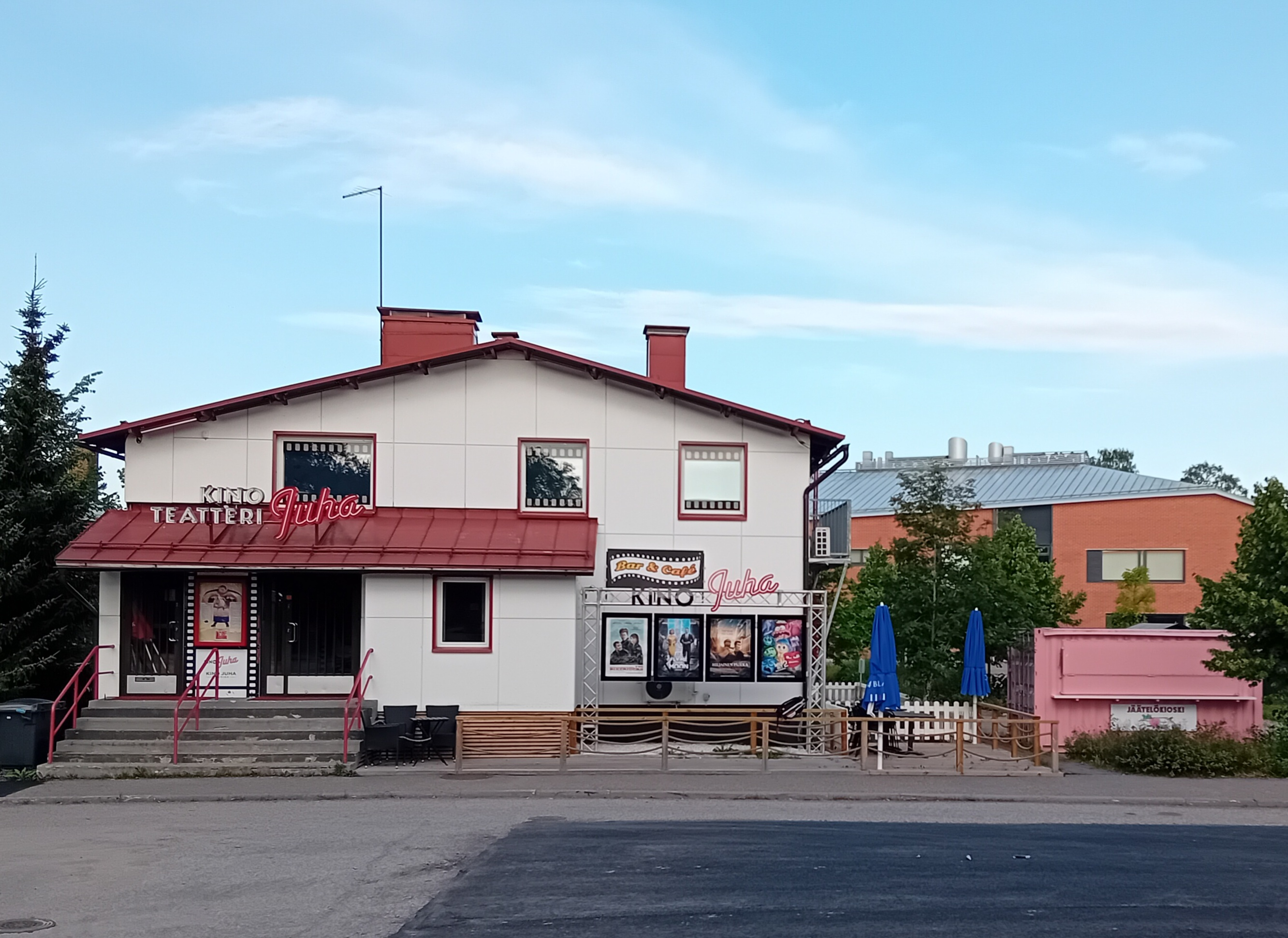
Kino Juha

In the town center of Nurmijärvi is the small cinema Kino Juha, which has been in use since 1958 and is the size of only one hall. In Klaukkala, there is a multipurpose building Monikko, where many kinds of events are organized, such as concerts or other live events.

The title bird of Nurmijärvi is the black woodpecker (Dryocopus Martinus), the title animal is the European badger (Meles meles) and the title plant is the male fern (Dryopteris filix-mas).

=== Food ===
In the 1980s, the cultural dishes of Nurmijärvi parish were called pastries with raisin soup, a roast beef cured slowly in mild heat, berry cream and sweetened potato casserole.

=== Dialect ===
The Finnish language spoken in the Nurmijärvi area is based on the Southern Tavastian dialect, which belongs to the Tavastian dialects. The dialect has influences from southwestern intermediate dialects and the dialects of Swedish-speaking Finns. Characteristic features of the Nurmijärvi dialect are the widening of diphthongs, the r-sound as a weak equivalent of t, and the tt (long /t/) representation of the ts combination. There is also a final throw. The Nurmijärvi dialect forms a subgroup together with Hyvinkää and Tuusula.

=== Sports ===
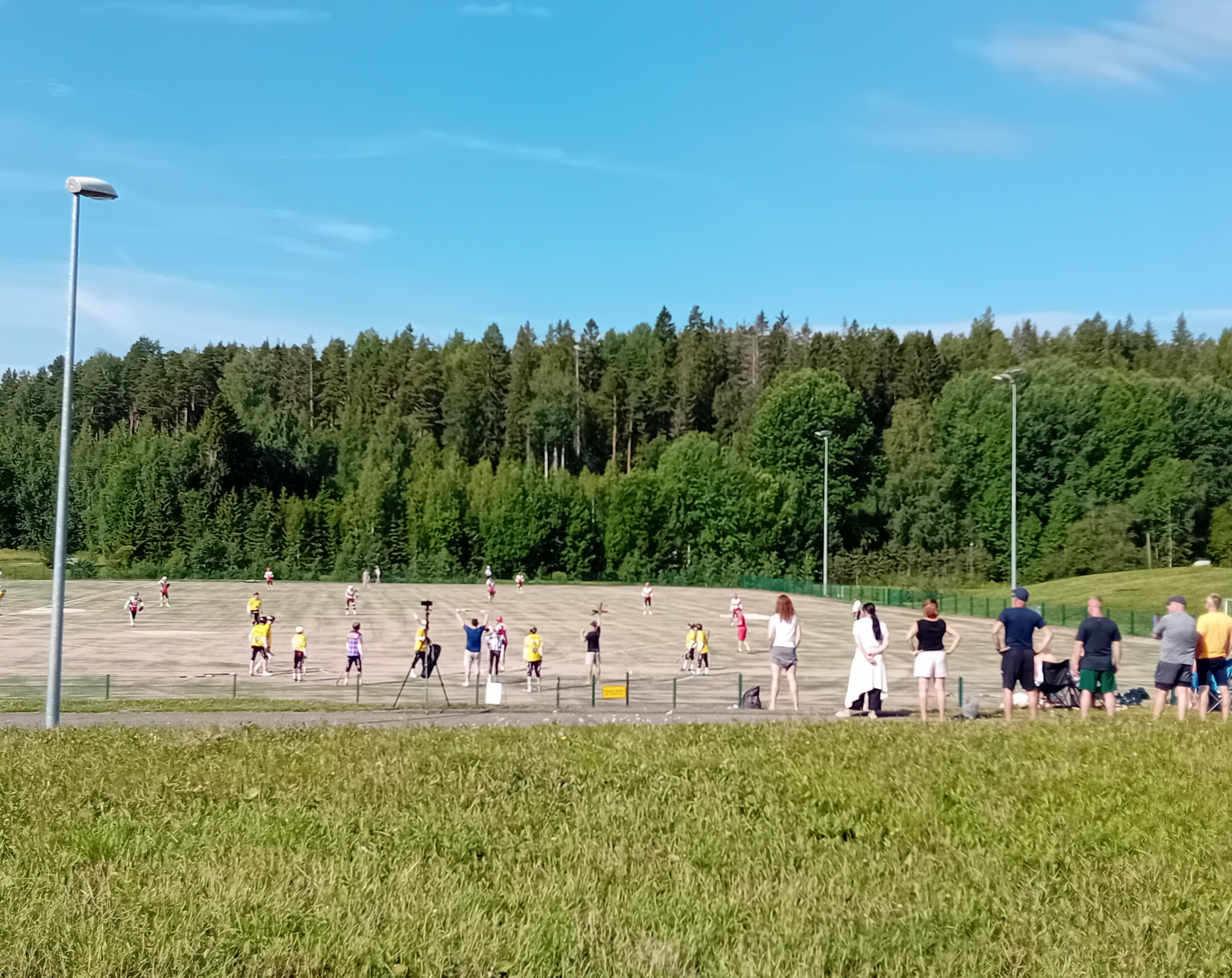
A pesäpallo match in Nurmijärvi

The biggest sports area in Nurmijärvi is the Klaukkala sports field (Klaukkalan urheilukenttä). Klaukkala also has an ice rink, and a tennis and squash hall. There is an indoor swimming hall in Rajamäki.

Nurmijärvi's sports clubs include the football club NJS, the ice hockey club Kurra Hockey, the figure skating club Nurmijärven Taitoluistelijat, the orienteering club Rajamäen Rykmentti, an athletics club Nurmijärven Yleisurheilu, the floorball club SB-Pro, and the pesäpallo club Nurmijärven Maila.

== Infrastructure ==
=== Health ===
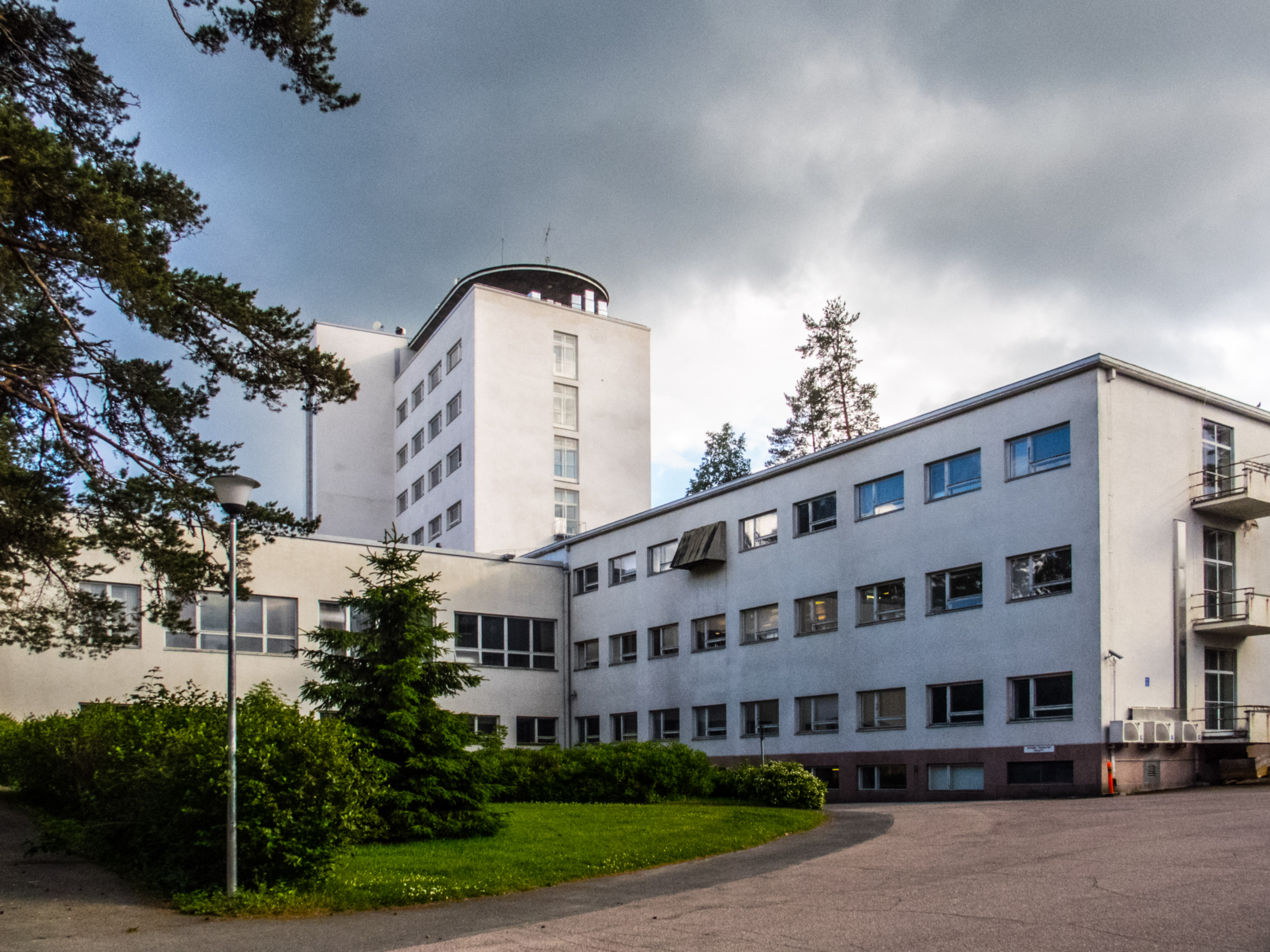
Kiljava Hospital

There are three health centers in Nurmijärvi that are part of the service production of the Central Uusimaa Joint Municipal Authority for Social and Health Service (Keski-Uudenmaan sotekuntayhtymä or Keusote): in the church village, Klaukkala and Rajamäki. In addition, there is also a hospital in the Kiljava village, which currently operates as a rehabilitation hospital.

=== Education ===
In terms of basic education, Nurmijärvi has 17 primary schools (one for Swedish-speaking people), two comprehensive schools and one special education school. In terms of secondary education, Nurmijärvi has three secondary schools: Nurmijärvi Joint School (Nurmijärven yhteiskoulu) in the church village, Rajamäki High School (Rajamäen lukio) in Rajamäki and Arkadia Joint Lyceum (Arkadian yhteislyseo) in Klaukkala. The latter high school is private, the others are run by the municipality of Nurmijärvi. In addition, there is one of the campuses of Keuda, a consortium of vocational schools that provides vocational training, along the Lopentie in the village of Perttula. The oldest still-operating school in the municipality is located in the village of Uotila since 1875.

== Transport ==
The most important traffic route through Nurmijärvi is Finnish national road 3 (Vt 3; E12) between cities of Helsinki and Tampere. The highway was built as a motorway in the 1990s, and the old highway next to it between Helsinki and Hämeenlinna was numbered as Regional Road 130. Highway 3 is joined by Finnish national road 45 (Kt 45) on the Hyvinkää side from Hyrylä in Tuusula and through the eastern part of Nurmijärvi, and Finnish national road 25 (Vt 25) between Hanko and Porvoo passes through the northern part of the municipality near the Röykkä village. Other important roads are the Regional road 132 to Loppi and Karkkila via Klaukkala, Perttula and Röykkä and the connecting road 1311 to Rajamäki via the Nurmijärvi church village. The Hanko–Hyvinkää railway, which currently has only freight train traffic, also passes through Rajamäki and Röykkä. In Nurmijärvi, especially from Klaukkala, there are frequent bus services via Kivistö and Keimola of Vantaa to the Central Bus Terminal of Kamppi Center in Helsinki.

With the growth of Klaukkala, traffic congestion between Regional road 132 and Highway 3 has worsened so much over the years that the construction of a bypass road on the northside of Klaukkala as a new continuation of the regional road began in 2019. Although it was tentatively scheduled to be completed only in fall 2021, it is likely to be completed in summer and for traffic road may open as early as the end of 2020.

== Notable people ==
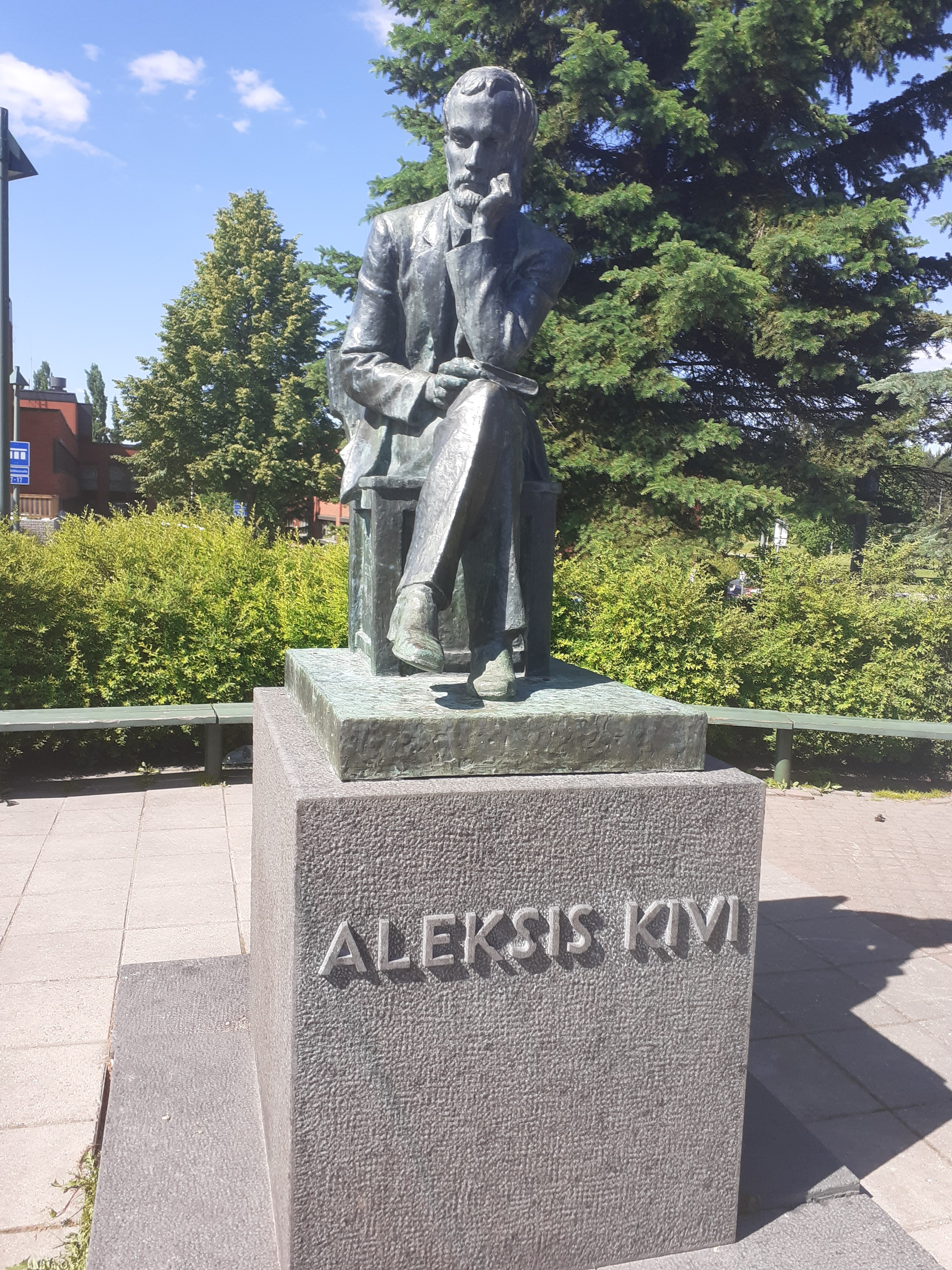
A statue of Aleksis Kivi

- Bernhard Crusell (1775–1838), a composer
- Ellen Jokikunnas (born 1976), a model and PR manager
- Antti J. Jokinen (born 1968), a music video and film director
- Antti Kalliomäki (born 1947), a politician and athlete
- Dome Karukoski (born 1976), a film director
- Jesse Krohn (born 1990), a racing driver
- Aleksis Kivi (1834–1872), an author and playwright
- Jussi Niinistö (born 1970), a politician and a former Minister of Defence
- Viivi Pumpanen (born 1988), Miss Finland 2010
- Teemu Rautiainen (born 1992), a professional ice hockey player
- Aki Sirkesalo (1962–2004), a singer and broadcaster
- Timo Tolkki (born 1966), a guitarist, singer and songwriter
- Matti Vanhanen (born 1955), a politician, former Prime Minister of Finland and current Speaker of the Parliament
- Tatu Vanhanen (1929–2015), a political scientist and sociologist; the father of Matti Vanhanen
- Taavi Vartia (born 1965), a film director and script writer
- Waldo (born 1967), Eurodance musician

== Friendship cities ==
- Lilla Edet, Sweden
- Rapla, Estonia

== See also ==
- Nurmijärvi robbers
