= Nurmijärvi (lake) =

Dried lake in Nurmijärvi, Finland

- Kirkkojärvi
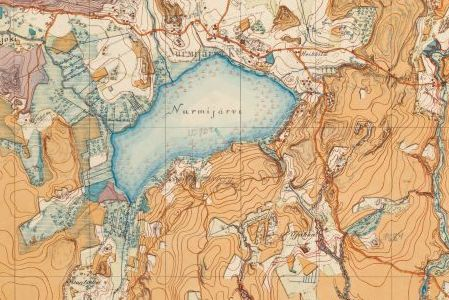

- Location within Finland
- Location: Nurmijärvi, Finland
- Coordinates: 60°27′00″N 24°47′40″E
- Basin countries: Finland

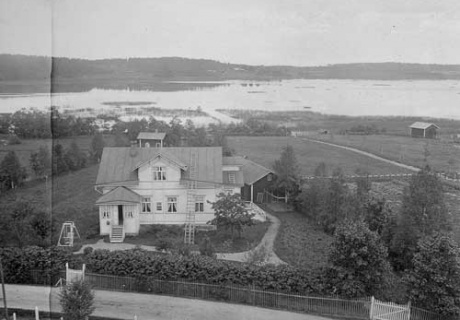
Picture of Nurmijärvi

Nurmijärvi was a bird lake in Nurmijärvi municipality, in Finland. Its surface was first measured in the 1920s and it completely dried up in the 1950s. It was also called Kirkkojärvi (lit. 'Churchlake').
