= Lilius =

Lilius is a surname. Notable people with the surname include:

- Lilius family
- Aloysius Lilius (c. 1510–1576) principal author of the Gregorian Calendar
  - Lilius (crater), named after him
- Franciszek Lilius (c. 1600–1657), Polish composer
- Henrik Lilius (1683–1745), Finnish poet
- Johan Lilius (1724–1803), Justice of the Hovrätt and founding member, with Henrik Gabriel Porthan, of the Aurora Society.
- Frans Hugo Lilius (1860–1936), Finnish senator, Minister of Justice
- Frans Oskar Lilius (1871–1928), Finnish senator.
- Albert Lilius (1873–1947), Finnish professor of psychology at Helsinki University, pioneer in developmental psychology.
- Aleko Lilius (1890–1977), Finnish adventurer and author.
- Carl-Gustaf Lilius (1928–1998), Finnish painter, sculptor and author
- Irmelin Sandman Lilius (1936–), Finnish Swedes author
- Henrik Lilius, (1939–) professor of art history at Helsinki University, professor of architectural history at Helsinki University of Technology, and former head of The National Board of Antiquities
- Mikael Lilius (born 1949), Finnish businessman
