= Lilius family =

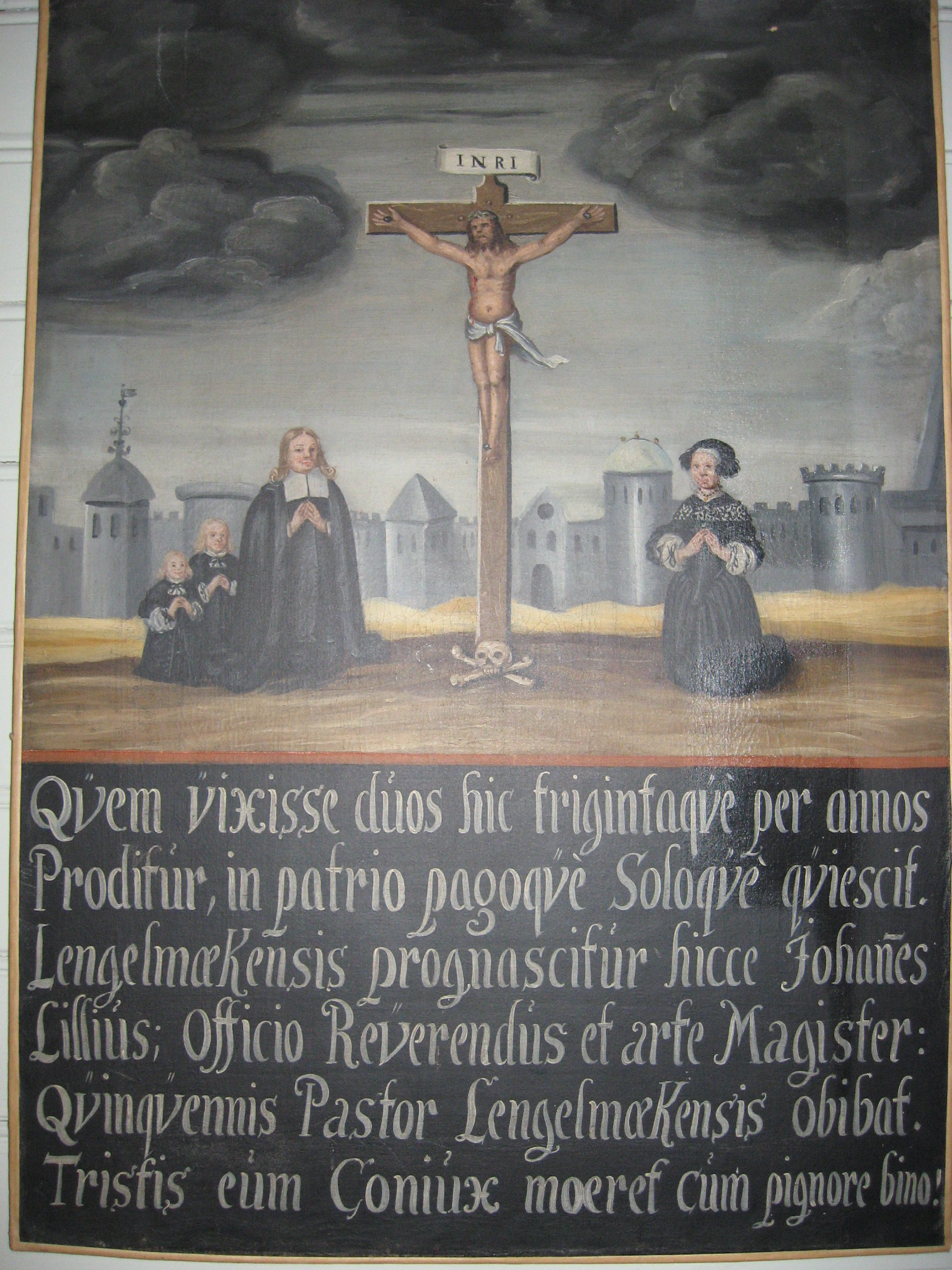

Lilius is a Finnish family that descend from the bailiff Hans Rainenius (b. 1540), who lived in Satakunta. His son Vicar Henrik Rainenius-Lilius (1590–1657) together with his three sons where the first to adopt the surname Lilius.

== Notable members ==
- Henrik Lilius (1683–1745), Finnish poet fi:Henrik Lilius
- Johan Lilius (1724–1803), Justice of the Hovrätt and founding member, with Henrik Gabriel Porthan, of the Aurora Society
- Frans Hugo Lilius (1860–1936), Finnish senator, Minister of Justice
- Frans Oskar Lilius (1871–1928), Finnish senator
- Albert Lilius (1873–1947), Finnish professor of psychology at Helsinki University, pioneer in developmental psychology
- Aleko Lilius (1890–1977), Finnish adventurer and author
- Carl-Gustaf Lilius (1928–1998), Finnish painter, sculptor and author, married to Irmelin Sandman Lilius
- Henrik Lilius, (1939-) professor of art history at Helsinki University, professor of architectural history at Helsinki University of Technology and former head of The National Board of Antiquities
- Mikael Lilius (1949-), former president and CEO of the Finnish energy company Fortum

== See also ==
- The National Biography of Finland
- Swedish-speaking Finns
