= Fennoman movement =

Late-1800s Finnish nationalist movement

The Fennoman movement or Fennomania was a Finnish nationalist movement in the 19th-century Grand Duchy of Finland, built on the fennophile currents of the 18th and early 19th centuries. Its aim was to raise the Finnish language and Finnish culture from the status of a peasant vernacular to that of a national language and a national culture, and ultimately to constitute Finland as a nation on a par with other European cultural nations. Its opponents, the Svecomans, defended the position of Swedish, and the confrontation between the two shaped the language strife that ran through the Grand Duchy's public life.

Paradoxically, much of the movement's leadership was drawn from Swedish-speaking families. Johan Vilhelm Snellman, who gave political fennomania its most influential formulation in the newspaper Saima from 1844, argued that Swedish-speaking intellectuals such as himself had a duty to adopt the Finnish language and a Finnish national identity, and that Finnish was destined to replace Swedish as the language of education and administration; his thinking was given official form in the language rescript approved by Emperor Alexander II in 1863. Many Fennomans accordingly Fennicized their surnames, among them Yrjö Sakari Yrjö-Koskinen, born Georg Zacharias Forsman.

The Finnish Party was founded in 1863 and became the movement's principal political organisation, dominated from the 1860s by the "Young Fennomans" (Finnish: jungfennomaanit) around Yrjö-Koskinen, whose insistence on strict adherence to their programme alienated both the older generation and, in the K.P.T. faction of the early 1880s, a socially radical student wing. In the 1890s the party divided into a conservative "Old Finnish" and a liberal "Young Finnish" wing, a rupture that under the Russian integration policy of 1899–1917 came increasingly to turn on loyalty to the emperor versus constitutional resistance. After independence in 1917 the intellectual legacy of fennomania was carried on in its most far-reaching form by the interwar movement of True Finnishness and the Academic Karelia Society, which in turn met a Swedish-language counter-mobilisation in the shape of East Swedishness.

The terms fennomania and svecomania are common in historical writing but have never been universally accepted, and were felt by some contemporaries and later scholars alike to carry pejorative connotations.

== Terminology ==
Jorma Vallinkoski (1915–1980) traced the word fennomania back to private correspondence as early as 1804; it was in public use in Sweden at least by 1810. In this original sense it denoted a personal or scholarly interest in the culture and history of Finland and in the Finnish language. The term acquired a more explicitly political charge after the middle of the 19th century, when it came to be associated with intensified Fennicization efforts in the Grand Duchy. In reaction against the fennomania of the late 19th century there also arose a mobilisation in defence of the Swedish language in Finland, whose supporters correspondingly became known as Svecomans.

Both fennomania and svecomania subsequently became common, but by no means universally accepted, terms in historical writing. A leading critic of the terms was the historian Max Engman (1945–2020), who objected to the suffix -mania because of its connotations of "disease or derangement". Similar reservations can be observed in the public debates of the late 19th century, where fennomania and its counterpart svecomania were at times understood as pejorative labels for excessive — "manic" — sectarianism in language politics. Yrjö Sakari Yrjö-Koskinen (1830–1903), a leading figure of the late-19th-century movement, for his part preferred the Finnish term suomikiihko — zeal or passion for Finnishness — as a description of his own position, and announced in 1863 that a Suomikiihkon puolue ("party of zeal for Finnishness") had come into being. A number of alternative terms have accordingly been proposed and used, both by contemporaries and by later historians, of which "Finnish-minded" and "Swedish-minded" (suomenmielinen or suomalaismielinen, and ruotsalaismielinen or ruotsinmielinen, in Finnish) are among the most common.

== Background: fennophilia ==
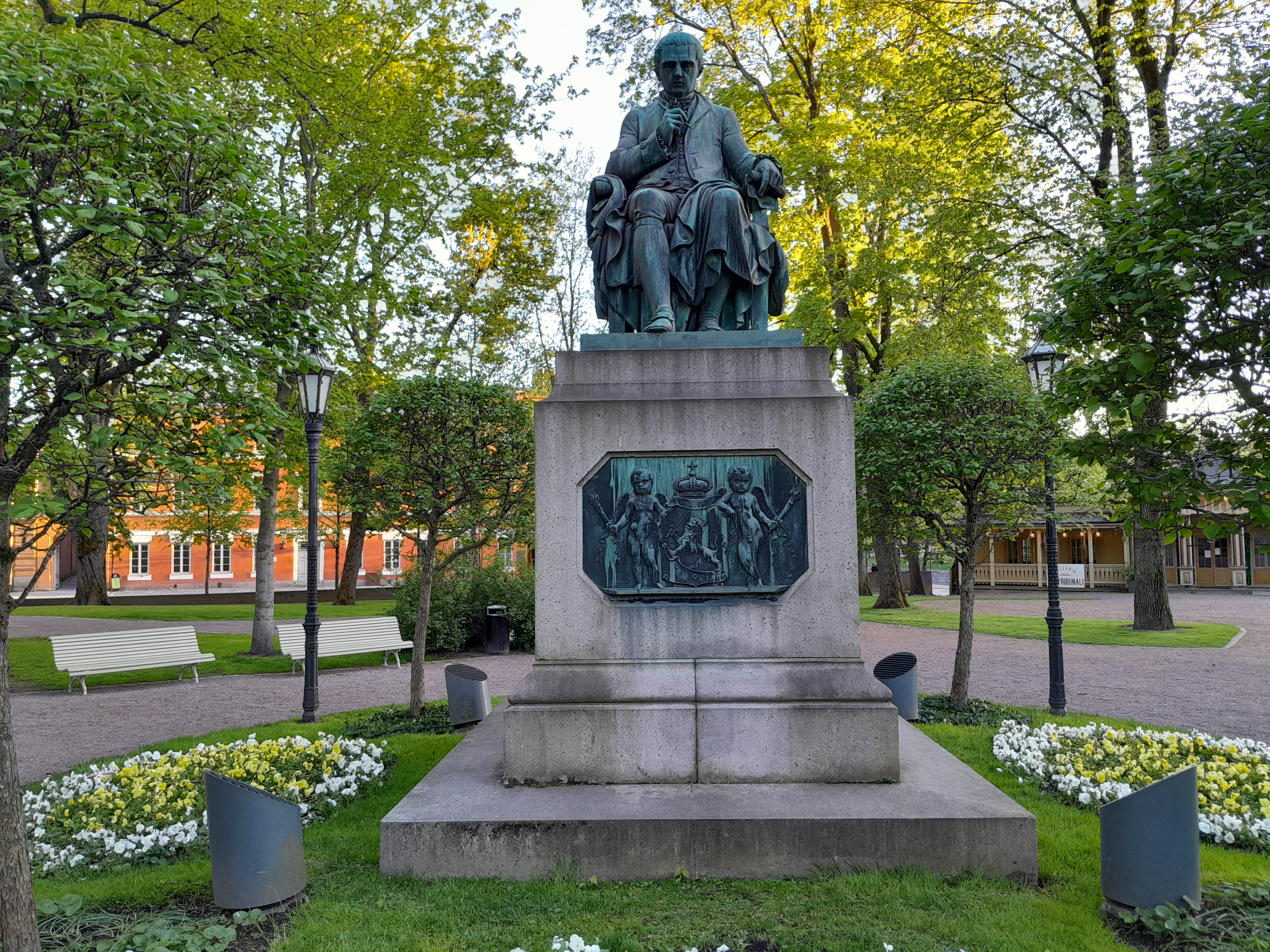
Statue of Henrik Gabriel Porthan in Turku

Historical writing often distinguishes between fennomania and fennophilia, the latter describing an older era or form of enthusiasm for Finnishness. Among the figures commonly grouped under the umbrella term fennophilia are the bishop and professor Daniel Juslenius (1676–1752), author of the first Finnish dictionary of its kind (1745), and Henrik Gabriel Porthan (1739–1804), "the father of Finnish history writing". Fennophilia is thus characterised chiefly as an intellectual interest in Finland, and in particular in the Finnish language and its speakers, during the 18th century. The term has also been used for early currents of enthusiasm for Finnishness after Sweden lost the Grand Duchy of Finland to the Russian Empire in 1809. On this view a certain continuity is traced from 18th-century fennophilia to phenomena such as Turku Romanticism, which carried on Porthan's intellectual legacy in the first decades after his death by, among other things, studying the customs of the Finnish-speaking peasantry and publishing its folk poetry. The transition to fennomania is, on the same reading, located in the middle of the 19th century, when the enthusiasm for Finnishness began to take on firmer or even radically political contours.

In terms of conceptual history, however, there are difficulties in drawing an unambiguous line between an older fennophilia and a younger fennomania. The first explicit use of the term fennophilia can hardly be dated to an exact year, whereas the attestations of fennomania from 1804 and 1810 noted above use the term neither in a radical nor in a pejorative sense, but in much the same meaning as was subsequently ascribed to fennophilia. Where fennophilia was used in the Grand Duchy's newspaper press in the later 19th century, by contrast, it was employed in opposition to fennomania, which was increasingly equated with a more radical enthusiasm for Finnishness. Such a distinction was also drawn by Johan Ludvig Runeberg (1804–1877), who in a letter of 1862 identified himself with "civilised fennophilia" rather than with "the crudeness of the fennoman".

The chronological divisions outlined above should, as Engman points out, be treated with some reservation. The earlier fennophilia lacked neither political content nor public influence. An illustrative example is the Aurora Society, which Porthan helped to found in Turku in 1770. This learned society's interest in the history and geography of Finland and in the Finnish language found a significant public voice through Tidningar Utgifne Af et Sällskap i Åbo, Finland's first newspaper (1771–1785). It would also be misleading to treat fennophilia and fennomania as two ideologically uniform camps. Juslenius, for instance, had already in 1715 identified Swedish rule as responsible for several of the misfortunes that had befallen the people of Finland, which in his view included Finnish-speakers and Swedish-speakers alike. The later Porthan is a considerably more contested historical thinker: he regarded Swedish influence as on balance a positive factor in the development of the Finnish-speaking population, while at the same time asserting their linguistic and cultural distinctiveness within the Swedish realm.

A further debate concerns whether the classical fennophilia–fennomania distinction is historiographically serviceable at all; Juha Manninen (1945–2023), for example, has preferred to describe both Juslenius and Porthan as early — though not separatist — Finnish nationalists. The same description holds for the early-19th-century intellectuals who have likewise been called fennophiles by other scholars. At the Diet of Porvoo in 1809, in the wake of the Finnish War, Emperor Alexander I of Russia (1777–1825) confirmed the Grand Duchy's new autonomous status within the Russian Empire by raising Finland "among the number of nations". Taking the emperor at his word, the fennophile generation that followed set about defining what was distinctive about Finland and its people, and this may be regarded as an attempt to legitimise the Grand Duchy's newly won national status. As with Porthan, the fennophiles of the early 19th century therefore also embraced a thoroughgoing loyalty to monarchical authority. Both Runeberg and Zacharias Topelius (1818–1898) stressed the emperor's protection as a fundamental precondition for the advancement of Finnishness, a line of thought that Snellman shared as well.

Engman has applied the historian Miroslav Hroch's theory of the three phases of nationalism to Finnish conditions. Phase A in Hroch's schema denotes a "learned interest in language, folk culture, antiquities and history" among intellectuals who nevertheless lack the mass-organisational support needed to translate their academic and cultural interests into patriotic agitation. In the history of enthusiasm for Finnishness this phase coincides with early fennophilia, and in particular with the founding of the Finnish Literature Society (Finnish: Suomalaisen Kirjallisuuden Seura, SKS) in 1831. The organisation behind the society's emergence was the Saturday Society (Finnish: Lauantaiseura), whose membership consisted mainly of Swedish-speaking intellectuals. Phase B of Hroch's schema stands in turn for the "formulation of political demands and patriotic agitation" for increased national consciousness beyond scholarly and cultural activity, which in Engman's application coincides with the publication of the newspaper Saima from 1844.

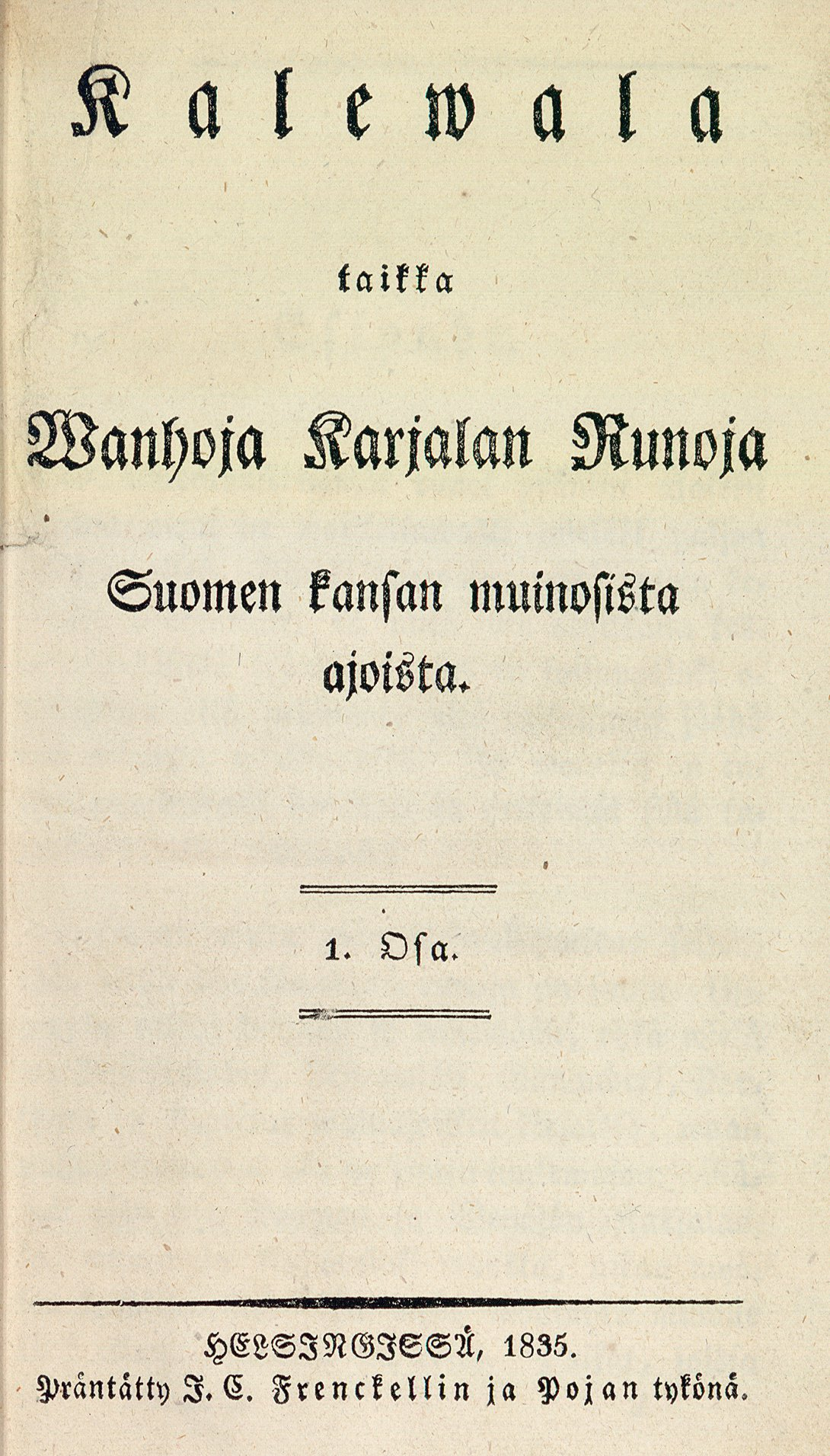
The title page of the first edition of the Kalevala (1835)

Among the purposes for which the Finnish Literature Society had been founded was the publication of the Kalevala, the epic that Elias Lönnrot compiled from Finnish oral poetry and which appeared in 1835. At the society's annual meeting the following year the professor of rhetoric J. G. Linsén declared that Finland, in possession of these epic poems, would learn "with uplifting self-esteem" rightly to understand its future spiritual development, and would be able to say to itself: "I too have a history." There was no doubt as to the work's enormous significance and impact — which persisted in part even though a large proportion of its enthusiasts could not read it in the original language, and had to wait for the Swedish translation of 1841.

== Snellman and political fennomania ==
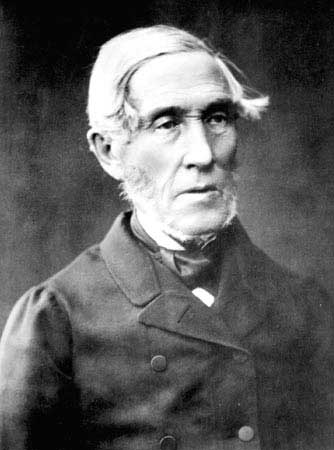
Johan Vilhelm Snellman (1806–1881), philosopher, journalist and senator, was the most influential formulator of a political fennomania.

The editor of Saima was the philosopher, writer and statesman Johan Vilhelm Snellman (1806–1881), one of the most radical members of the Saturday Society.

Snellman argued that the Finnish language was ready to take over the role of Swedish in the Grand Duchy's public life as the language of education and administration. This he held to be both necessary and natural: Finland could develop into a distinctive nationality only if its majority gained access to education and culture in its own language, from which it followed that Swedish was destined to be displaced from public life in favour of Finnish. Snellman accordingly maintained that Swedish-speaking intellectuals such as himself had a duty to adopt a Finnish national identity and the Finnish language as their own. In this he drew on a position previously advanced by Porthan, namely that Finnish was the "real mother tongue" of Finland's population. The "Fennicization" of the Grand Duchy's public life would thus in fact be a return to the linguistic situation that had prevailed before Swedish rule began to "Swedify" the eastern part of the realm. Snellman also put his ideas into practice through the drafting of the Language Rescript of 1863 which, with the approval of Emperor Alexander II in 1863, laid down that Finnish was to be raised to the status of an official administrative language of the Grand Duchy within a set period. Engman has described Snellman as the starting point of a "political fennomania", a tangible development of the fennophilia that had prevailed earlier.

Snellman's nationalist agitation was radical enough that it was at times treated with suspicion and censored as potentially subversive by the imperial authorities; he was appointed professor only in 1856, after the accession of Alexander II and the government's turn to a new reform policy, and became a member of the Senate and head of its finance department in 1863. He did not himself take part in Fennoman party politics, working above all for a change of language within the educated class rather than for rapid social change. Within the Grand Duchy his activity aroused both admiration and opposition. In line with phase C of Hroch's schema, nationalist mass organisations both for and against the Snellmanian programme began to emerge in the Grand Duchy from the 1860s onwards. The Finnish Party (Finnish: Suomalainen puolue) was founded in 1863 and gradually developed into a central organisation for a new generation of militant Finnish-minded activists, who presented themselves as the only legitimate political representatives of the Finnish-speaking mass of the people and who intensified the language strife.

== Fennoman politics after Snellman ==
=== The Finnish Party and the Young Fennomans ===
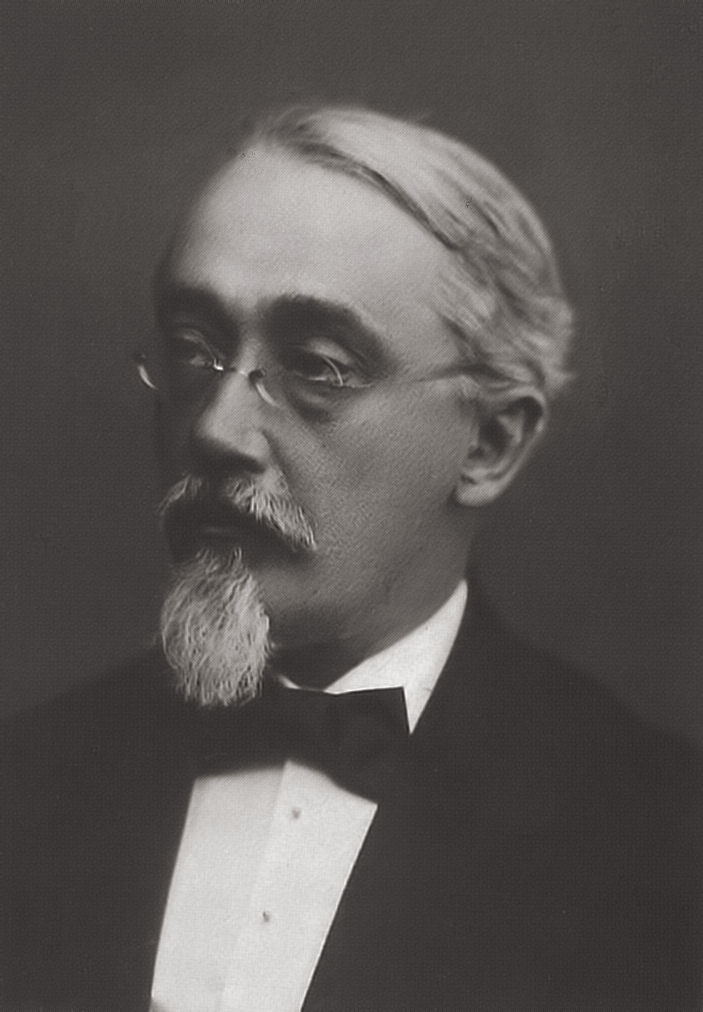
Yrjö Sakari Yrjö-Koskinen, born Georg Zacharias Forsman, led the Young Fennomans.

The more thoroughly politicised generation of Finnish-minded activists after Snellman soon became known as the "Young Fennomans" (not to be confused with the later, liberal Young Finns), a name given to them by the newspaper Helsingin Uutiset. They consisted chiefly of the core group around the historian and politician Yrjö Sakari Yrjö-Koskinen, who established a hegemonic position within the leading organisations of the Finnish movement from the 1860s onwards. Yrjö-Koskinen's grouping took Snellman's ideas a step further and argued for a wholly Finnish nation as the only possible road to an independent Finland on a par with other cultural nations. This meant agitation for active Fennicization — something Yrjö-Koskinen personally embodied. Born Georg Zacharias Forsman into an entirely Swedish-speaking family, and ennobled under the name Yrjö-Koskinen in 1884, he had learned Finnish as an adult, a process that by his own account "felt like a descent into hell".

The Young Fennomans pursued their aims in cultural life, politics and historical writing alike, and would tolerate no competing form of enthusiasm for Finnishness. Yrjö-Koskinen demanded strict adherence to the Young Fennoman programme, and thus marginalised a number of dissenters on his way to top positions in organisations such as the Finnish Literature Society and the Finnish Party.

Although the Young Fennomans considered themselves the torch-bearers of the Finnish cause, the older generation resented their peremptory advance. Yrjö-Koskinen invoked, for example, Zacharias Topelius's earlier advocacy of a Finland-centred historiography, while the Young Fennomans' dismissal of Sweden's significance for Finland's development led the formerly anti-Swedish Topelius to defend the Swedish heritage. Snellman, whom the Young Fennomans had made into their symbolic figurehead, was likewise angered by Yrjö-Koskinen's campaign against pluralism within the Finnish movement. The greatest division brought about by the Young Fennomans, however, played out within the Finnish Party, their own principal organisation.

=== The K.P.T. faction ===
In the late 1870s and early 1880s a counter-reaction against the Young Fennomans' perceived conservatism arose in the student world. A group led by Lauri Kivekäs held that Yrjö-Koskinen and his Young Fennoman ally Agathon Meurman were too intent on staffing the Grand Duchy's bureaucracy and dreamed of a Finnish state, while they had forgotten the Finnish people.

In 1879 Kivekäs's radical Fennoman grouping withdrew from the Finnish-national student organisation Suomalainen Nuija and in 1880 founded the society K.P.T. The abbreviation K.P.T. stood in the first instance for Koko programmi toimeen ("carry out the whole programme"), but its members also gave it further readings such as Kansan pyhä tahto ("the people's holy will") and Kaikki punaiset toverit ("all red comrades"). K.P.T. advocated total hegemony for the Finnish language and adopted a more aggressive stance towards the Swedish-speaking upper class than the Young Fennomans. At the same time the movement laid strong emphasis on social questions, and Kivekäs drew influences both from German socialists such as Ferdinand Lassalle and August Bebel and from the Jacobins of the French Revolution. The combination of linguistic and social radicalism was evident in the group's strong focus on the Finnish people, in contrast to the increasingly conservative, state- and bureaucracy-oriented fennomania of Yrjö-Koskinen and Meurman. Matti Klinge has compared K.P.T. to the Russian Narodniks on account of its similar populist proto-socialism.

Although K.P.T. arose, and chiefly operated, within the student world, the grouping played a larger role in the Grand Duchy's public life in the early 1880s. Prominent members included Arvid Järnefelt, Juhani Aho and Jonas Castrén. Over the course of the later 1880s the radicalism of large parts of the group subsided, and former adherents joined the more liberal nationalist current that was to crystallise as the Young Finns.

=== Old Finns and Young Finns ===
In the 1890s a faction emerged within the Finnish Party, the "Young Finns" (Finnish: nuorsuomalaiset), which formed a separate party in 1907. "Young Finns" was a self-chosen designation in contrast to the Koskinen grouping, who were instead labelled "Old Finns". Through their principal organ Päivälehti the Young Finns conducted an intense polemic against the Old Finns' Uusi Suometar, for which reason suomettarelaiset also became established as a synonym for the latter camp. The general cause of the split is often identified as tensions between liberal nationalist impulses and the conservative cast of the Old Finns, while the historian Ilkka Liikanen traces the early division principally to practical questions of political organisation. The liberal–conservative division hardened towards the end of the 19th century, above all with the issuing of the February Manifesto in 1899 and the start of the era of Russification.

== Russification and independence ==
=== Russification and the loyalty line ===
The February Manifesto, formally His Imperial Majesty's Gracious Manifesto (Statutes of Finland 3/1899), was one element in the Russian imperial power's policy of integrating the empire's borderlands. Through the manifesto the emperor and the Russian State Council reserved the right to bypass the Grand Duchy's principal representative body, the Diet, in decisions deemed to concern the empire as a whole. Constitutionalist opinion in the Grand Duchy read the manifesto as opening the way for the step-by-step dismantling of the distinctive autonomy Finland had enjoyed since 1809. Matti Klinge has by contrast emphasised that the manifesto did not touch legislation concerning Finland alone, nor the Finnish state institutions, and that its purpose was to settle the procedure for imperial legislation, the Finnish institutions retaining the right to consider such proposals and submit opinions on them.

The integration policy divided opinion among the Grand Duchy's educated strata. As leader of the Finnish Party, Yrjö-Koskinen advocated a continued loyalist line towards the imperial power. The integration policy could be tolerated as long as its principal target was the old constitutional laws — a legacy of the Swedish period — and as long as the representatives of the Finnish-speaking majority were permitted to retain their political posts. Yrjö-Koskinen argued further that in the worst case the Finnish nation could survive even without the Grand Duchy's state framework. Given their liberal foundations, the Young Finns could not tolerate attacks on the legalistic basis of the Grand Duchy, which made possible a truce with the grouping around the Swedish Party in "constitutional" resistance. The junior Fennomans denounced this realignment as politically reckless, pointing to the imperial power's brutal suppression of the Polish uprisings of the 1830s and 1860s.

The aims of the integration policy and the reasons behind it remain a debated subject in Finnish historical writing. Besides the security or geopolitical aspect, a Great-Russian Pan-Slavist dimension has also been identified as an influence on the imperial power's conduct. The period after 1899 and up to Finnish independence in 1917 has therefore often been regarded as a time of Russification, when the Russian language and Russian culture were given increased scope in the Grand Duchy in order to strengthen the imperial core's political control. Yrjö-Koskinen, however, regarded such measures against the Finnish language as the point at which his loyalist position would become untenable. Such reservations were in any case insufficient for the constitutionalists, whose propaganda emphasised the Russification aspect and branded the Old Fennomans as treacherous "compliants" (Swedish: undfallenhetsmän; Finnish: myöntyväisyysmiehet).

=== The decline of the Old Finns ===
The upheavals of the 1890s damaged both the Finnish Party's credibility and its internal cohesion, and as the imperial power's integration policy advanced, more and more Old Finns distanced themselves from Yrjö-Koskinen. Yrjö-Koskinen asked to be relieved of his seat in the Senate, which was granted, and thereafter confined himself to writing in Uusi Suometar, outwardly calm but embittered. He nonetheless remained leader of the Finnish Party until his death in November 1903, when he was succeeded by Johan Richard Danielson-Kalmari (1853–1933). The loyalty line's greatest setback began in the autumn of 1905, when a general strike spread across the Russian Empire and paralysed the imperial power. For Finland the strike brought considerable concessions through the November Manifesto, which in practice withdrew the Russification measures.

Some two years of ambitious political reform followed under the liberal senator Leo Mechelin (1839–1914). During this period the Old Finns were relegated to opposition, while the far-reaching parliamentary and suffrage reforms of 1906 obliged their constitutionalist counterparts to devise more concrete mass-political strategies. The Swedish Party was accordingly reorganised as the Swedish People's Party in 1906, while the Young Finnish Party was officially founded the following year, each gathering the now enfranchised public to Swedish-minded and Finnish-minded politics respectively. The same period also reversed the roles of the Grand Duchy's political leadership and opposition: Mechelin's constitutionalists entered into far-reaching cooperation with the Russian imperial core and were consequently denounced as collaborators by the Old Finns.

=== The second period of Russification and independence ===
The constitutionalists' attempts at cooperation rested on unstable ground and soon collapsed under the pressure of a recovered imperial power. During the ensuing "second period of Russification", or "period of oppression", from 1908 onwards, willingness to cooperate with the imperial core was lower in the Grand Duchy than ever before. Even the majority of the Finnish Party kept its distance from the imperial power, while Danielson-Kalmari sought to develop the party's position in a cautiously constitutionalist direction.

Russification finally receded with the Russian Revolution and Finnish independence in 1917. After Finland's subsequent civil war the Finnish and Young Finnish parties were eventually wound up and new parties formed. A number of former Young Finns made significant advances in Finland's reshaped political landscape; one example was Pehr Evind Svinhufvud, winner of the republic's presidential election of 1931 as the candidate of the National Coalition Party. Former Old Finns such as Juho Kusti Paasikivi — prime minister in 1918 and again in 1944–1946, and president in 1946–1956 — were active in the same party.

Among the most pressing political questions of the first decade of independence was the treatment of surviving participants on the losing side of the civil war, the socialist Reds — a question rendered especially charged by the Bolshevik seizure of power in Russia in late 1917. The fresh experience of the civil war and the precarious geopolitical situation of the bourgeois White victors produced strongly anti-socialist attitudes in the public life of interwar Finland, which often merged with a generally Russophobic line of argument. From this followed the popularisation of historical interpretations that cast suspicion on Finnish–Russian cooperation in the past, which also helped to seal a particularly notorious reputation for the "compliance line".

== Legacy: True Finnishness and East Swedishness ==
Independence did not mean that the old tensions between the proponents of Finnishness and of Swedishness were consigned to the past. On the contrary, such disputes returned with additional charge during the interwar period.

=== True Finnishness ===
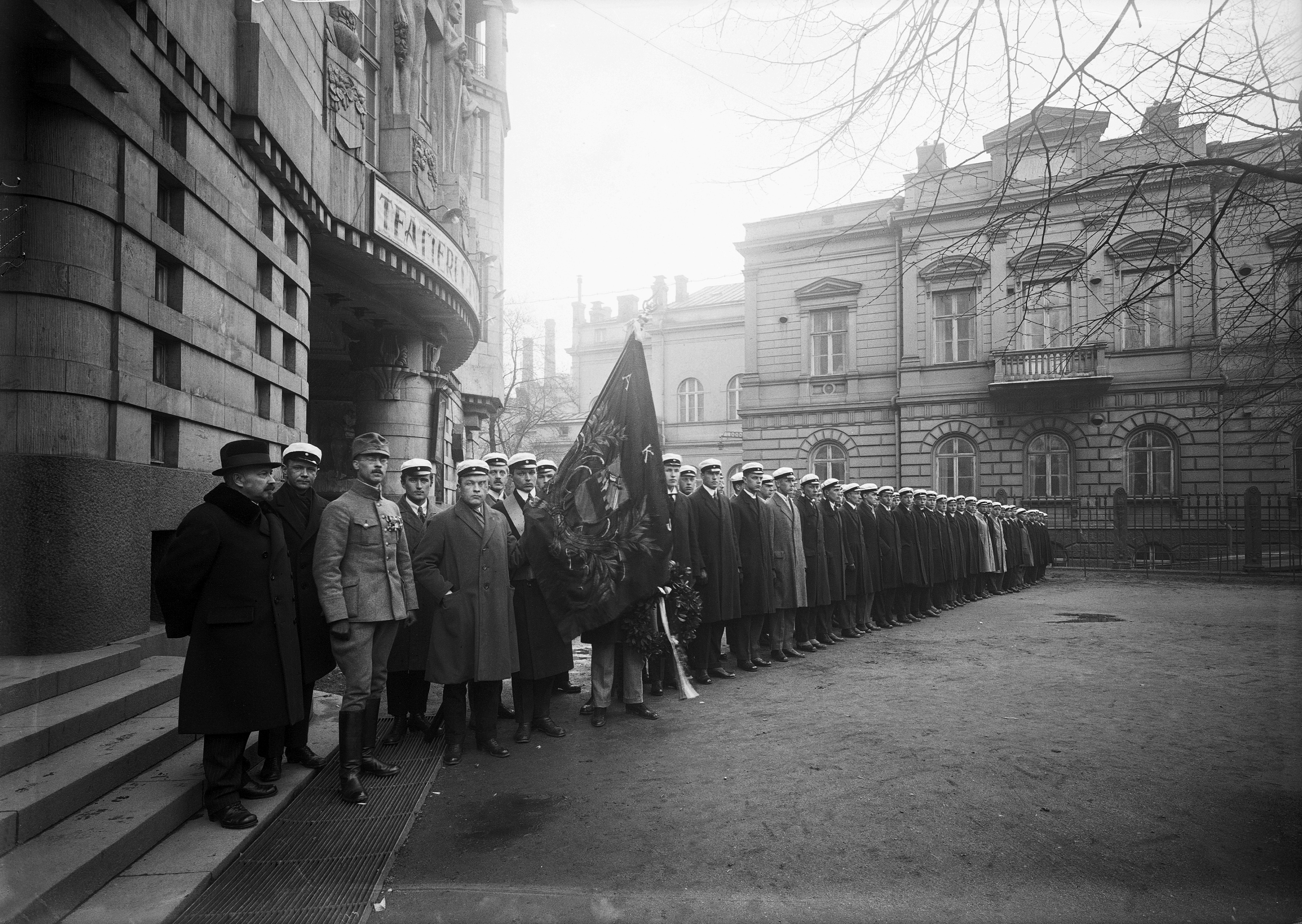
Members of the Academic Karelia Society outside the New Student House in Helsinki in 1922

In interwar Finland the intellectual legacy of the Finnish movement was carried on in its most far-reaching form by so-called True Finnishness (Finnish: aitosuomalaisuus). The sociologist Risto Alapuro has described how the striving for a strong national community (Gemeinschaft) on the political right after the polarising civil war drew its inspiration from a fennomania modified to suit prevailing conditions. Central to this movement was a sharpening of moral values along the lines of a peasant ideal, and the creation of national unity.

The militant grouping that called itself the True Finns (Finnish: aitosuomalaiset, unconnected with the present-day Finns Party) grew out of the civil war and the associated kinship wars in Estonia and East Karelia; its vision of the future was a monolingually Finnish and "White" Greater Finland. In the late winter of 1922 a radical student elite, at whose core were volunteers from those wars, founded the Academic Karelia Society (Finnish: Akateeminen Karjala-Seura, AKS), whose purpose was to assist the kinsmen who had fled to Finland and to keep the dream of a Greater Finland alive. The society was animated from the outset by an explicitly and radically anti-Russian stance. New members swore a solemn oath at the blue-and-white flag to sacrifice their work and their lives for "the Fatherland, Finland's national awakening, and Karelia, Ingria and a Great Finland"; they were also expected to Fennicize "foreign" surnames and to belong to the Civil Guard. Henrik Meinander describes AKS as an exclusively male and nationalist "storm troop" which, over its period of activity up to 1944, gathered some 3,100 members.

The foreign-policy idea of a Greater Finland was closely bound up with True Finnishness's principal domestic aim: a total Fennicization of public life, seen as a precondition for the consolidation of the nation ahead of the anticipated trial of strength with Bolshevik Russia. The struggle came to a large extent to concern language legislation at the University of Helsinki. After a protracted conflict, parliament adopted a new university act in 1923, built on a proposal by Professor E. N. Setälä, under which the language of instruction was tied to the proportional distribution of Finnish-speaking and Swedish-speaking students. In November 1928 the True Finnish student elite gathered an address signed by more than 3,000 students demanding a total Fennicization of the university. The language strife continued in various forms right up to the second half of the 1930s.

Corresponding militant and nationalist student elites emerged at the same time in several of the new states that had come into being in Eastern Europe after the First World War, and they gradually became more receptive to anti-democratic and fascistoid visions of society. The radical-right Lapua Movement (1929–1932) was one of the most militant offshoots of the enthusiasm for Finnishness; Alapuro characterises Finnish fascism as a broadly bourgeois reaction and a culmination of Finnish nationalism. Despite the Lapua Movement's nationalist character, it took a comparatively mild position on the language question, which it regarded as secondary to the struggle against communism and the completion of the "War of Liberation". True Finnishness's anti-Swedish rhetoric should also be qualified: the scholar Ainur Elmgren has argued that anti-Swedish expressions in interwar public life for the most part did not concern Sweden, but were rather a True Finnish way of ridiculing domestic political opponents in the defence and language questions.

=== East Swedishness ===
Ethnonationalist radicalisation was not, however, a purely Finnish-speaking phenomenon. As a counterpole to True Finnishness there developed among Swedish-speakers a radical East Swedishness (Swedish: östsvenskhet), according to which the Swedish-speaking population of Finland constituted a nationality of its own rather than a language group within the Finnish nation. As early as the 1910s, representatives of the Swedish-speaking student elite, such as Artur Eklund, had — invoking the racial thinking of the period — described themselves as Germanic and the country's Finnish-speaking population as a people more closely related to the Slavs. The movement acquired organs of its own, among them Östsvensk Tidskrift (1917–1918), and in the years around 1917–1919 advanced demands for Swedish-language self-government, ranging from proposals for Swedish provinces and "cantons" to a Swedish "national assembly".

Matti Klinge has characterised the True Finnish movement's racially tinged hatred of Russians as ideological borrowing from activist circles in Sweden and their East Swedish sympathisers in Finland; both camps had taken their impressions from the Central European nationalism of the 1910s, in which the nation was conceived as an organism. According to Meinander, the most nationalist circles of the two language groups perceived each other's sharp attacks as expressions of a broader opinion, which provoked defences mounted in the name of the entire language group. Through such conflicts the nationalists of both groups contributed to constructing Finland-Swedishness as an "imagined community". This in turn made compromise more difficult and drove forward monolingual solutions in cultural and associational life.

== Motto ==
The Fennoman motto traditionally attributed to Adolf Ivar Arwidsson is usually quoted in a standardised form, in Finnish and in Swedish:

Ruotsalaisia emme ole,
venäläisiksi emme tahdo tulla,
olkaamme siis suomalaisia.

Svenskar äro vi icke,
ryssar vilja vi icke bli,
låt oss alltså vara finnar.

"Swedes we are not,
Russians we do not want to be,
so let us then be Finns."

The attribution is not authentic, and there is no single original wording. The historian Liisa Castrén showed in 1951 that Arwidsson neither wrote the words nor was likely to have uttered them; Åbo Morgonblad, which he edited during its single year of publication in 1821 and to which the saying was later credited, contains no such phrase. Historians have instead traced it to Johan Vilhelm Snellman. In an essay on Porthan printed in his Swedish-language Litteraturblad in September 1861, Snellman observed that no one in Porthan's day could have regarded Finnish as a national language, and that it was above all the changed political circumstances after 1809 that brought the idea to life. Put briefly, he wrote, it ran: "Swedes we are no longer; Russians we cannot become; we must be Finns." He was thus interpreting Finland's position after the break with Sweden rather than summarising Arwidsson's programme, and did not himself attribute the words to Arwidsson.

Jani Marjanen has shown that Snellman was not the first in print. More than a year earlier, in 1860, Yrjö Koskinen — then still Georg Forsman — published in the periodical Mehiläinen a travel letter from Stockholm containing a closely similar formulation in Finnish and expressly invoking Arwidsson; it appeared the same autumn in Swedish translation in Åbo Underrättelser. The saying became established in the press towards the end of the 1860s, almost always coupled with Arwidsson's name, and came to be known as suomalaisuuden syntysanat ("the birth-words of Finnishness"). Its wording varied constantly, which suggests it also circulated orally; the variant omitting "no longer" gradually prevailed, turning a statement about a historical process into a programme for the present. Although the phrase occurred in both languages, it was far more current in Finnish, with 266 occurrences in the digitised Finnish-language press of 1860–1909 against 19 in the Swedish-language press. Kari Tarkiainen likewise regards the phrase as a formulation coined by Snellman to express the core of Arwidsson's political thought, and it was in this spirit that Arwidsson was assessed from the 1860s until the Second World War.

== Fennicization of surnames ==
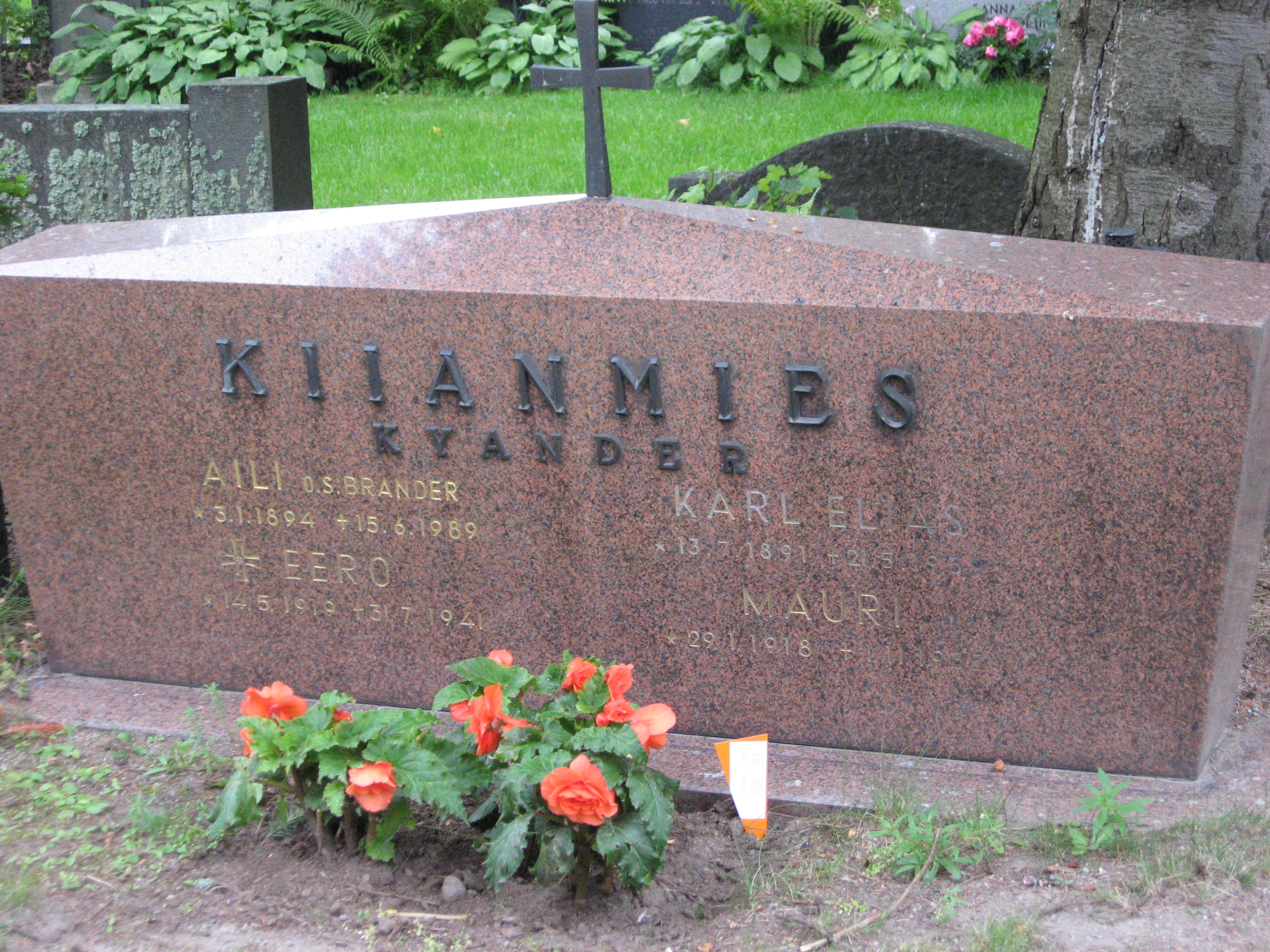
A set of graves in Tampere, showing the original surname "Kyander" as well as the Fennicized "Kiianmies"

The mother tongue of many of the first generation of Fennomans, like Snellman and Yrjö-Koskinen, was Swedish. Some of the originally Swedish-speaking Fennomans learned Finnish and made a point of using it inside and outside the home; several others came from Finnish-speaking or bilingual homes.

Most of the Fennomans also Fennicized their family names, particularly from the end of the 19th century. The Association of Finnish Culture and Identity (Finnish: Suomalaisuuden Liitto), founded after the introduction of the unicameral parliament in 1906, demanded a total Fennicization of public life in Finland and immediately launched a campaign to Fennicize "foreign" surnames; some 70,000 citizens adopted Finnish surnames in 1906 and 1907.

== Prominent Fennomans ==
The Fennoman movement's leading figures were drawn to a striking extent from Swedish-speaking families, and many of them adopted Finnish surnames. For the 18th- and early-19th-century fennophiles who preceded the movement, see Background above.

Politicians and statesmen

- Yrjö Sakari Yrjö-Koskinen, formerly Georg Zacharias Forsman
- Agathon Meurman
- Johan Richard Danielson-Kalmari
- Juho Kusti Paasikivi, formerly Johan Gustav Hellsten
- Kaarlo Juho Ståhlberg, formerly Carl Johan Ståhlberg
- Heikki Renvall
- Alexandra Gripenberg

Radical Fennomans of the K.P.T. circle

- Lauri Kivekäs, formerly Stenbäck
- Jonas Castrén
- Arvid Järnefelt
- Juhani Aho

Scholars, writers and artists

- Johan Vilhelm Snellman
- Fredrik Cygnaeus
- Julius Krohn
- Eemil Nestor Setälä
- Otto Donner
- Pietari Hannikainen
- Johannes Linnankoski
- Hjalmar Mellin
- Eero Järnefelt
- Toivo Kuula
- Yrjö Jahnsson

== See also ==
- History of Finland
- Finland's language strife
- Svecoman movement
- Kagal
- Romantic nationalism
- Turanism

== Bibliography ==
- Alapuro, Risto (2018) [1988]. State and Revolution in Finland. Historical Materialism Book Series 174. Chicago.
- Ahlskog, Jonas; Kaihovirta, Matias; Wickström, Mats (2018). "Nationen i klasskampen: Minoritetsnationalism inom den socialistiska arbetarrörelsen" (PDF). Historisk tidskrift (in Swedish). 3.
- Engman, Max (2016). Språkfrågan: Finlandssvenskhetens uppkomst 1812–1922 (PDF). Finlands svenska historia 3. Skrifter utgivna av Svenska litteratursällskapet i Finland 702:3 (in Swedish). Helsinki & Stockholm: Svenska litteratursällskapet i Finland & Bokförlaget Atlantis.
- Hänninen, Reetta (2023). Kapinaa ja kiusantekoa: Venäjän sortokoneiston vastustus Suomessa (in Finnish). Helsinki.
- Högnäs, Sten (1995). Kustens och skogarnas folk: Om synen på svenskt och finskt lynne (in Swedish). Stockholm: Bokförlaget Atlantis.
- Jussila, Osmo (1977). "Nationalism and revolution: Political dividing lines in the Grand Duchy of Finland during the last years of Russian rule". Scandinavian Journal of History. 2.
- Jussila, Osmo (1986). "De röda svekomanerna. Ryssarnas uppfattningar om svenskarna i Finland före 1917". In Max Engman & Henrik Stenius (ed.). Svenskt i Finland 1. Studier i språk och nationalitet efter 1860. Skrifter utgivna av Svenska litteratursällskapet i Finland 511 (in Swedish). Helsinki. pp. 111–119.
- Klinge, Matti (1978). Ylioppilaskunnan historia. Kolmas osa 1872–1917: K.P.T.:stä jääkäreihin (in Finnish). Helsinki: Helsingin yliopiston ylioppilaskunta ja Oy Gaudeamus Ab.
- Klinge, Matti (1983). Runebergs två fosterland (in Swedish). Helsinki: Söderströms.
- Klinge, Matti (2004) [1996]. Finlands historia III. Kejsartiden (in Swedish). Helsinki.
- Liikanen, Ilkka (1995). Fennomania ja kansa: joukkojärjestäytymisen läpimurto ja Suomalaisen puolueen synty (PDF). Historiallisia tutkimuksia 191 (in Finnish). Helsinki: Finnish Historical Society.
- Marjanen, Jani (2020). ""Svenskar äro vi icke mera": Om ett uttrycks historia". In Tandefelt, Henrika; Dahlberg, Julia; Roselius, Aapo; Silvennoinen, Oula (eds.). Köpa salt i Cádiz och andra berättelser: festskrift till professor Henrik Meinander den 19 maj 2020 (in Swedish). Helsinki: Siltala. pp. 163–184. ISBN 978-952-234-731-2.
- Meinander, Henrik (2016). Nationalstaten: Finlands svenskhet 1922–2015 (PDF). Finlands svenska historia 4. Skrifter utgivna av Svenska litteratursällskapet i Finland 702:4 (in Swedish). Helsinki & Stockholm: Svenska litteratursällskapet i Finland & Bokförlaget Atlantis.
- Tommila, Päiviö (1988). Sanomalehdistön vaiheet vuoteen 1905. Suomen lehdistön historia 1 (in Finnish). Kuopio.
- Vallinkoski, Jorma (1953). "Fennomania-käsitteen syntyvaiheita: Porthanin kuoleman jälkikaikuja". Historiallinen aikakauskirja (in Finnish). 3.
- Vares, Vesa (2000). Varpuset ja pääskyset: Nuorsuomalaisuus ja Nuorsuomalainen puolue 1870-luvulta vuoteen 1918 (in Finnish). Helsinki: Suomalaisen Kirjallisuuden Seura.
- Villstrand, Nils-Erik (2009). Riksdelen: Stormakt och rikssprängning 1560–1812 (PDF). Finlands svenska historia 2. Skrifter utgivna av Svenska litteratursällskapet i Finland 702:2 (in Swedish). Helsinki & Stockholm: Svenska litteratursällskapet i Finland & Bokförlaget Atlantis.
- Wassholm, Johanna (2020). "Det passiva motståndets praktiker" (PDF). Historiska och litteraturhistoriska studier (in Swedish). 95. Svenska litteratursällskapet i Finland.
