= Johan Lilius =

Johan Lilius (1724–1803) was a Finnish justice of the Hovrätt in Åbo (Turku), at a time when this court was part of the judicial system of Sweden, and a founding member of the Aurora Society.

Lilius was influential in the development and growth of Finnish literature and contributed among other things articles to Finland's first newspaper Åbo Tidningar.

== See also ==
- Henrik Gabriel Porthan
- Lilius family

== Sources ==
- Helsinki University, baccalaureatus matricula
