= Erik Munsterhjelm =

- Born: March 28, 1905; Lohja, Finland
- Died: March 26, 1992 (aged 86); Brantford, Canada
- Occupations: Writer, geologist
- Spouse: Anne‑Marie Emilia Anderzen (m. 1942)
- Parent(s): Alarik (Ali) Gustaf Waldemar Munsterhjelm; Alma Olivia Dahlberg
- Family: Munsterhjelm noble family

Erik Munsterhjelm, born on 28 March 1905 in Lohja and died on 26 March 1992 in Brantford, was a Finnish writer and geologist. He belonged to the noble family Munsterhjelm.

Munsterhjelm was the son of the artist Alarik (Ali) Munsterhjelm and Alma Olivia Dahlberg. Erik Munsterhjelm was married to Anne‑Marie Emilia Anderzen from 1942.

Munsterhjelm was admitted to the Cadet School in 1927, but left the following year and moved to North America, where he supported himself until 1940 as, among other things, a gold prospector and fur trapper. He worked as a mineral prospector for various mining companies in Canada between 1930 and 1939. He returned to Finland to take part in the Winter War, but did not see service until the Continuation War. From 1942 to 1944 he worked as a mineral prospector (discovering, among other things, the copper deposits at Luikonlahti) and was employed as a geologist by The International Nickel Co. of Canada Ltd. from 1948 to 1967. He also worked as a prospector for Malmikaivos–Ruskealan Marmori Oy between 1943 and 1945. Later in life he lived in Canada during the summers and in Mexico during the winters.

Munsterhjelm published several accounts of his experiences in North America, including Med Kanot och hundspann (1942) and Som vagabond till Kalifornien (1945). In English he published the autobiographical The Wind and the Caribou (1953), which was translated into several languages.

== Selected bibliography ==
- Med kanot och hundspann. På jaktfärder i Norra Kanadas vildmarker. Helsinki, 1942
- Guldfeber. Malmletning och pälsjagarliv i Kanada. Helsinki, 1943
- Pionjärens hemlighet. Porvoo, 1943
- Den underbara dalen. Äventyrsberättelse för ungdom. Loviisa, 1944
- Som vagabond till Kalifornien. Utvandrarliv och hund-år i Amerika. Helsinki, 1945
- Gamle Bill. Äventyr i Nordlandet. Loviisa, 1946
- Amulettens gåta. Äventyrsberättelse för ungdom. Helsinki, 1947
- Katra. Porvoo, 1947
- The Wind and the Caribou. 1953
