= Onni Puhakka =

Finnish farmer, cooperative organizer and politician (1870–1955)

Onni Olof Puhakka (18 September 1870 – 15 September 1955) was a Finnish farmer, cooperative organizer and politician, born in Kontiolahti. He was a member of the Parliament of Finland from 1910 to 1913, representing the Young Finnish Party.
