= Rimminen =

Rimminen is a Finnish surname. Notable people with the surname include:

- Marjut Rimminen (born 1944), Finnish-born animator and film director
- Mikko Rimminen (born 1975), Finnish novelist and poet
