= Jonas Castrén =

Finnish lawyer and politician (1850–1922)

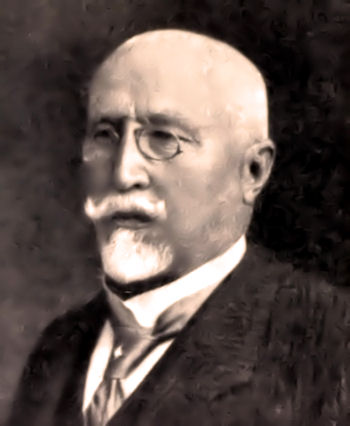
- Born: February 25, 1850; Pyhäjärvi, Grand Duchy of Finland
- Died: October 10, 1922 (aged 72); Hyvinge, Finland
- Occupations: Lawyer, politician
- Political party: Young Finnish Party

Jonas Castrén (25 February 1850, Pyhäjärvi – 10 October 1922, Hyvinkää) was a Finnish lawyer and politician. He was one of the leading figures of the Young Finnish Party and a prominent constitutionalist during the Russification era. He was a member of the Diet of Finland from 1885 to 1906 and of the Parliament of Finland from 1907 to 1917.

== Biography ==
Jonas Castrén was the son of the vicar Zachris Castrén and Betty Leontine Reuter. He graduated in 1869, received a Bachelor of Arts degree in 1876, and a Bachelor of Laws degree in 1893. He participated in student politics as a radical Fennoman. In 1885, he was elected to the Estate of the Peasantry of the Finnish Parliament, where he came into sharp opposition to the Old Finnish leaders led by Yrjö Koskinen and Agathon Meurman. Castrén became one of the leading figures in the Young Finnish Party. He was one of the founders of the newspaper Päivälehti in 1889. In 1894, he was ousted from the Parliament and subsequently became a lawyer. He ran his own law firm, focusing primarily on criminal cases but also on civil and political trials, which eventually made him a wealthy man. During the periods of repression in Finland, he came to the fore during the struggle against Russification and at the same time broke with his ultra-Fenomanian past and proclaimed a constitutionalist motto "Kaksi kieltä, yksi mieli" ("Two languages and one mind").

He participated in the Great Petition to Saint Petersburg in 1899 and was one of those exiled by Nikolay Bobrikov in 1903. He therefore went to Stockholm, but was able to return to his country in 1905. There he participated in the organization of the great strike of 1905 and was once again given a seat in the Estate of the Peasantry. From 1907 he belonged to the unicameral parliament. In 1908 he convened a meeting on the establishment of a Finnish section of the International Parliamentary Peace League, but later became involved in the Jäger movement and adopted a pro-German position. Between 1914 and 1921 Castrén lived mostly in Sweden. In Sweden he participated in the organization of the Jäger movement and tried to achieve a German landing in the Gulf of Bothnia.

Within the Young Finns party, Castrén was increasingly marginalized during the second period of repression. The party's actual leader, K. J. Ståhlberg, strove to build bridges to the Old Finns, and the party board even tried to prevent Castrén from being elected to the parliament, without success thanks to the great support he enjoyed in Viborg County.

At the outbreak of the Finnish Civil War in 1918, he sought military intervention in Sweden for the Vaasa Senate and was also allowed to meet with King Gustaf V of Sweden to win him over to the Finnish cause, but was judged to have acted too demandingly to achieve success.

When the question of the form of government of independent Finland was decided in 1918, Castrén was a monarchist, but was no longer at the center of events. He then supported the National Coalition Party, but never formally joined it because it contained too many of his old Old Finnish opponents, people he had broken with during the Russification years. He strongly opposed socialism, which he considered anarchist, and was conservative in economic and social matters.

Castrén was unmarried and bequeathed his estate to the Karelian Cultural Fund, which he had founded himself. The wreath sent by Gustaf Mannerheim to his funeral read: "To a fearless and determined freedom fighter for Finland".
