= Jalmari Meurman =

Finnish agronomist and politician (1870–1946)

Hjalmar (Jalmari) Fredrik Meurman (19 July 1870 – 3 February 1946) was a Finnish agronomist and politician, born in Kangasala. He was a member of the Parliament of Finland from 24 February to 31 March 1919, representing the National Coalition Party. He was the son of Agathon Meurman.
