= Finnish poetry =

Field of Finnish literature

Finnish poetry is the poetry from Finland. It is usually written in the Finnish language or Swedish language, but can also include poetry written in Northern Sámi or other Sámi languages. It has its roots in the early folk music of the area, and still has a thriving presence today.

The retrieval of these old folk songs in the 19th century reinvigorated the countries sense of poetic identity and influenced later poets. The best-known opus of Finnish poetry is the mythical epic Kalevala, compiled by Elias Lönnrot. Arguably the Kalevala established Finland in equal status with Sweden as a national language.

Poetry continues to be popular in Finland today and is marked by the individual directions its poets take not limited to traditional schools or ideologies. The contemporary form has taken on a conversational, matter-of-fact description often unmotivated by social, political, or moral agendas. The worlds of everyday life are prominent environments for discussing suffering, distortion of minds and absurd sequences of events.

== History ==
Due to Swedish occupation of Finland, from 1150 to 1809, there has not been much documented on the history of Finnish poetry. Only until the 19th century did efforts pioneered by Elias Lönnrot begin in collecting old folkloric and mythical material in the Northern parts of the country. In 1809 Russia annexed Finland and in doing so imposed military sanctions on Sweden. During this time Russian censorship severely limited the publication of Finnish literature and from 1850 to 1860 imperial decree forbad the publication of any work not dealing with politics or religion including folkloric poems, songs, and tales. Authorities claimed this repression of literature was said to be in the protection of the working classes, the only readers of Finnish poetry, against 'nonreligious and nonutilitarian' motives which would dissuade them from work. A morally protective view continued to be held by publishers aligned with the church up until 1964 when restrictions on printing and publication alleviated.

For the most part Russian culture did not interfere with the thematic representation of Finnish poetry as the Russians encouraged any sort of move which distanced them from their former Swedish rulers. Prior to this between 1766 and 1788 folk poetry saw a revival among upper classes who mostly spoke Swedish. Between 1864 and 1870 Aleksis Kivi, a writer and poet, was the first to publish his work in the Finnish language. Since then, national interest in Finnish poetry has only increased as Finnish Universities became increasingly interested in ancient texts in a conscious and collective movement towards national identity.

In the second half of the 19th century August Ahlqvist, known by his pseudonym Oksanen, also had a considerable influence on Finnish poetry providing strict rules about the forms of linguistic expression in an attempt to match if not rival the literary art of other European languages. These were attempts to abandon the 'beauties' of the old folk meter in favour of a more 'elegant and precise' form of meter well known to Europe. However, in subsequent years, during the 1920s and 30's, Ahlqvist's experimental form of poetry was attacked by many critics and writers because of its rhyme and fixed metric patterns despite Ahlqvist's experience writing poetry in the old folk meter. Alhqvist's reasoning for advocating the abandonment of the old folk meter came from a pre-emptive fear of Finnish writing sounding anachronistic. He also predicted the importance of stress in future Finnish poetry.

== Folk and oral poetry ==
Finnish old folk poetry or oral poetry from the Middle Ages were epic sequences or short songs. They were composed in old Finnish meter, a trochaic tetrameter of eight syllables and their lines are identifiable by two types, a dipodic trochaic line and the broken line. These poems were originally written for Finnish Nobility of the Middle Ages and they reflect universal myths such as the creation of the world from an egg, the Milky Way as being depicted by a humungous tree, and deeds of heroes. However, folksingers had widely not known the meaning of these words until their transcription in the 19th century.

Seclusion from the Roman Empire allowed ancient beliefs and folk poetry to develop undisturbed. Early 12th century poems centre around a violence and action reminiscent of the last days of Rome. Folk epics tell of the expeditions of Vikings, marauding, plundering and abducting foreign women. Courtly ballads include The Song of Inkeri and Lalmanti, as well as Elina's death. An interpretation of the Legend of Saint George titled The Song of the Virgin and the Dragon was an 'attempt to combine old forms with new subjects'.

Sampo is an early creation story about the adventures of the warrior Lemminkäinen, and the tragic hero Kullervo. These stories, belonging to the larger folk epic Kalevala, are mixed with historical as well as mystical themes which has caused speculation on fictionality of the tales' characters. Many of the lyrics are love songs emotive of Finland's rural landscapes pulling imagery from its forests, lakes and occasionally village life.

In the sixteenth, seventeenth and eighteenth centuries, clergymen hoped to stamp out the songs of old folk poetry due to its pagan origins despite efforts of Bishop Mikael Agricola, who introduced the Reformation into Finland in, in an effort to preserve the language of his people. In the preface to Jacobus Finno's hymn book of 1582 the Church's justification for its disdain towards old folk poetry seemed to be 'Because there were no sacred songs for the people to learn, they began to practise pagan rites and to sing shameful, lewd and foolish songs'.

Two centuries later attitudes towards folk poetry changed after scholar Henrick Gabriel Porthan in 1766 began research collecting old material. His advocation inspired serious scholarship among fellow teachers and students until in 1789, a friend Christfrid Ganander published Mythologia Fennica, 'an encyclopaedia of phenomena associated with folk beliefs and poetry'. Studying folk poetry has become a main resource in understanding and reconstructing Finland's past. By the 1820s expeditions to collect such material were already entering the borders of Russia. A leading figure in this part of history was Lönnrot, a collector who'd made contact with old folk singers taking notes of their poems. His idea was that the manner of these songs was fragmented in the sense that the Greek epics Illiad and Odyssey were believing that he could combine several epic sequences into one long poem. This process included the removal of unnecessary Christian imagery and the names of people and places in relation to the history of old folklore.

Collection of old folk poetry has continued since the 19th century in the spirit of National Romanticism. The collection of epic poetry was favoured above everything else as they were deemed part of an 'expansive oral narrative which one could still access'. The authenticity of these findings has continuously been debated as often national romantics had to creatively fill in the gaps left by the fragments they had found. However, today's scholars are less concerned with authenticity as defined by the folklore's origins and are rather concerned with bringing the pieces of Finland's poetic history together. The material retrieved from these expeditions have since been documented by modern scholars as 'shared experience dialogues' consisting of lyrics, proverbs and laments that refer to a broader 'discussion' between rune singers, collectors, and modern observers over the course of Finland's poetic history.

== 1960s ==
Post WWII Finland underwent an urbanisation which changed poets' relationships with culture and nature, specifically the forest. Like much of Europe and the western world, 1960s Finland saw an artistic period of challenging old taboo's where its poetry become heavily politicised. Though there also existed a school of poets who avoided politics and social idioms altogether. Their use of free rhythm, lack of rhyme and symbolic imagery showed a scepticism towards worldly politics in favour of honing lyrical expression.

After the war era of the 1930s, Finland's poetry mainly consisted of lines of prayer and mourning. However, as the turmoil settled in later decades its poetry became one of consideration, a reflection on past conflict as well as the international conflict beginning to rise with the Cold War where Finland found itself between powers from both East and West. This change in poetic attitude was in direct relation to the increase of Western consumer products alongside increases in income and mobility which gave well-to-do Finns the luxury of indulgent free time (City 514). The rapid urbanisation that also began in this period also brought forth buildings bearing no historical roots to folkloric history disrupting both a sense of cultural identity and social cohesion within these new cities. Nonetheless, the rise of East/ West politics and the discussion of international relations inspired younger more ambitious poets whose thinking predominantly came from Leftist Marxism.

Modernist poets, Paavo Haavikko and Pentti Saarikoski, reacted against the war generation drawing influence from T.S Eliot and other Finland-Swedish modernists. Their writing reflects historical parallels among other nations who had lost the war. The aesthetic of these poets was shaped using experimentation, introducing techniques such as collage and montage in order to what Veivo says, 'open the space of the text to foreign voices and materials and to connect with everyday life, politics and a wide range of social discourses'. This opened the poetic form to the creolization of language and allowing for elements, linguistic as well as social and political, to contaminate and merge with the poetry regardless of order. Some of the poetry from this time was also written to be published alongside popular articles of varying topics from economy, politics to community statistics on alcohol consumption.

The 'new poetry' of the 60s was radically different to the poetry of earlier decades. Abandoning the viewpoint that contemplation should be made from a distance and the old war themed trope of a 'no man's land', 60s Finnish poetry sought to align itself with the humanitarian movements happening in other countries. They embraced the bohemian lifestyle of the beatniks and advocated avant-garde forms of experimentation.

The relationship between the poet and their environment whether discorded or harmonious is visible throughout the 60s. With suburban housing complexes being both built on the edge of cities and deep within the forest, the relationship between people and their environment became framed and blocked by modern infrastructure. Parking lots, highways, flats and random objects of modernity littered the scenes of once quiet agrarian communities. Many poets felt displaced by this rapid change of scenery whilst others embraced it. Much of the discussion took place in Finland's capitol Helsinki where a number of poets based their poems.

In Matti Paavilainen's Kaupunki enemmän kuin kohtalo (City more than destiny, 1972), he writes: 'Everything you see is an answer to the question you didn't have to make', identifying the poets connection to the environment while noticing his discordance in terms of its development. Pentti Saarikoski's "Minä asun Helsingissä" ("I live in Helsinki", 1962) similarly states: "Helsinki my City remains in my mind, in good order / and when I am gone, it still moves like a tree". Finnish poets used Parallelisms such as these in a step-by-step processes of recognizing their own identity within a new modern state.

== Recent history ==
British poet and translator Herbert Lomas has written much about Finnish literature. In his review of Lomas' Contemporary Finnish Poetry, Binham highlights Lomas' views on 'the significance of poetry to Finn's, who "turn to it for solace, inspiration, stimulation to think about themselves, extension of experience and the shaping spirit"'. Contemporary poetry covers a variety of themes mainly concerned with disparity in modern society.

Although they depict similar worlds in their poetry, Contemporary poets have never used their ancestors as models. Rather they've only borrowed fragments such as the old metre in their works. Though some modernist uses of old folk metre came off as anachronistic, apart from Eino Leino who was one of the only poets to make use of it correctly, in versus consisting of a blend of both historical and the mythological. This success may be attributed to the fact the Leino had also perfected the form of other European metres much like his predecessors.

Sirkka Turkka's poetry, through the construction of her language, addresses the dualities of existence. Eeva Kilpi, is also an accomplished poet who is also praised for her autobiographical novels set after World War II. Due to the apparent neglect of women during the retrieving of old folk runes during the 19th century there has since been a rise in recognising women poets in Finland. Many of the lyrics of these women dealt with everyday 'griefs and joys' often depicting the poet as a solitary soul set in a rural landscape littered by lakes and trees (Brit) Today's contemporary poets deal with themes such as domestic and social life as well as the corruption of these environments within families further associating today's poets with their old folk predecessors.
