= Johan Erik Hedberg =

Finnish painter (1767–1823)

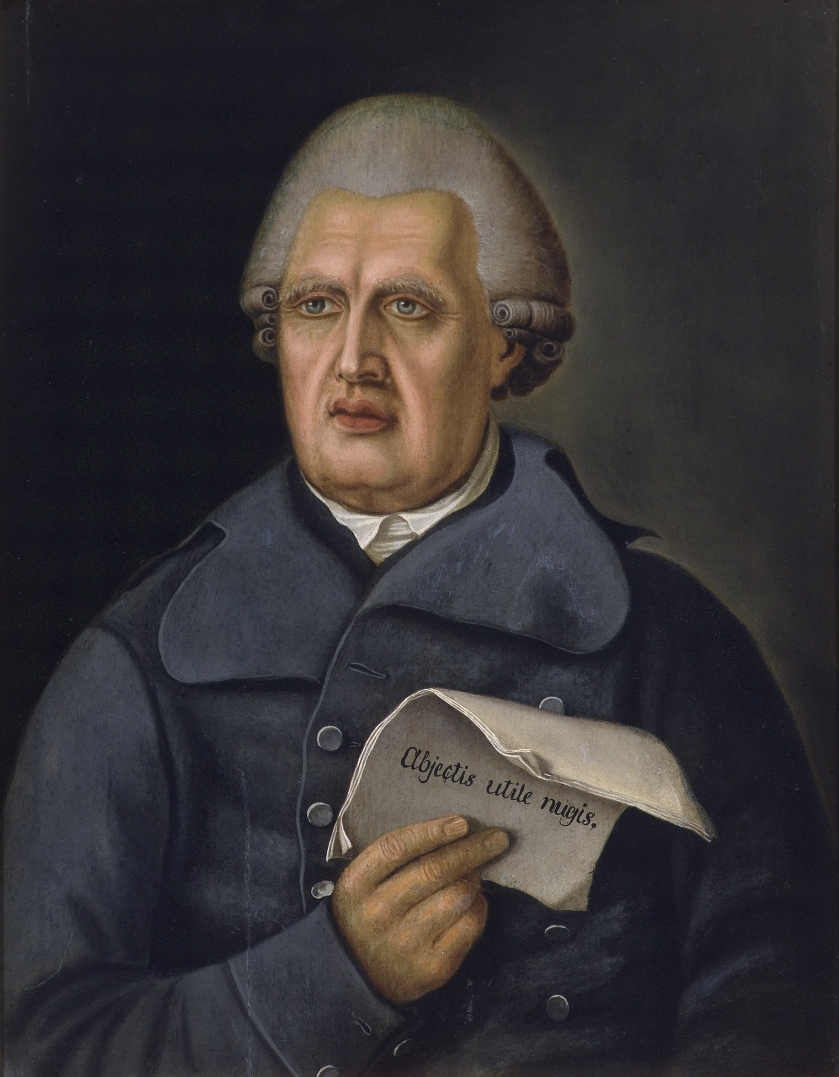
Henrik Gabriel Porthan (1799) by Johan Erik Hedberg.

Johan Erik Hedberg (9 March 1767 – 9 August 1823) was a Finnish painter.

Hedberg was born in Stockholm, and studied at the Royal Swedish Academy of Arts. He was married and had one son. Hedberg worked as a drawing teacher at the Royal Academy of Turku from 1799 until his death in 1823.
