= Frans Oskar Lilius =

Finnish politician

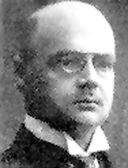
Frans O. Lilius (1871–1928)

Frans Oskar Lilius (15 April 1871 – 12 December 1928) was a Finnish politician. He was a member of the Senate of Finland, a member of the Finish Supreme Court and served three times as the Minister of Justice.

He was born in Messukylä and died in Helsinki.

== See also ==
- Minister of Justice (Finland)
- Supreme Court of Finland
- Young Finnish Party
- Lilius
