= Johan Vilhelm Snellman =

Finland-Swedish philosopher and statesman (1806–1881)

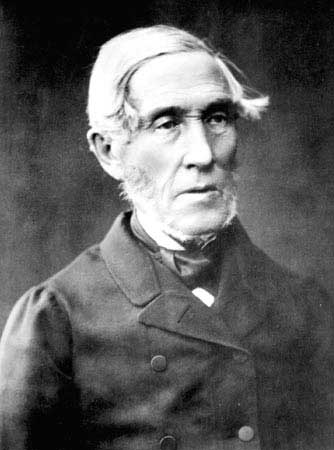
- J. V. Snellman in the 1870s.
- Born: 12 May 1806; Stockholm, Sweden
- Died: 4 July 1881 (aged 75); Kirkkonummi, Grand Duchy of Finland
- Education: Royal Academy of Turku
- Occupations: Philosopher, journalist, writer, politician

Johan Vilhelm Snellman (Swedish pronunciation: [ˈjuːhɑn ˈvilːhelm ˈsnelːmɑn]; 12 May 1806 – 4 July 1881) was a Finland-Swedish philosopher, journalist and statesman, and one of the leading figures of Fennoman nationalism in 19th-century Finland. A central exponent of Hegelian philosophy in the Nordic countries, he is regarded as one of the most important 'awakeners' of Finnish national identity, alongside Elias Lönnrot and J. L. Runeberg.

As editor of the newspapers Saima (1844–1846) and Litteraturblad (from 1847), Snellman introduced modern social criticism into Finnish public debate and argued that the educated classes should adopt Finnish as a language of culture and administration. He was appointed professor of philosophy at the University of Helsinki in 1856 and served as a senator and head of the first department of the finance committee from 1863 to 1868, during which time he carried through the monetary reform that pegged the Finnish markka to silver. Ennobled in 1866, he is commemorated annually on his birthday, 12 May, which is celebrated as the Day of Finnish Identity.

== Life and career ==
=== Early life and studies ===
Snellman was born in Stockholm, Sweden, the son of Christian Henrik Snellman, a ship's captain, and Maria Magdalena Röring. In 1813, four years after Sweden had ceded Finland to Russia in the Finnish War, the family moved to the Ostrobothnian coastal town of Kokkola (then known in Swedish as Gamlakarleby), where Snellman's mother died the following year. He attended school in Oulu and entered the Royal Academy of Turku in 1822, initially intending to study for the priesthood, alongside the slightly older J. L. Runeberg and Elias Lönnrot.

He soon turned to philosophy and took his master's degree in 1832. He settled in Helsinki in 1828 when the university was moved there after the Great Fire of Turku. In 1835 Snellman was appointed lecturer (docent) at the University of Helsinki, and became closely associated with Hegelian philosophy. In this respect the Finnish university was distinctive within the Nordic countries, where philosophy at the time was largely dominated by Schellingian idealism; Hegelian thought, by contrast, had been firmly established in Helsinki by Snellman's teacher Johan Jakob Tengström. His advocacy of academic self-government brought him into conflict with the university authorities, however, and in 1838 his lectureship was temporarily suspended.

=== Exile in Sweden and Germany ===
As a consequence, Snellman left Finland in 1839 and spent the years 1839–1842 in Sweden and Germany. In Stockholm he served as assistant editor of the weekly Freja and intervened in the literary debate around Carl Jonas Love Almqvist's controversial novella Det går an, publishing his own response Det går an. Fortsättning (1840). He then spent nearly a year in Tübingen, where he wrote Versuch einer speculativen Entwicklung der Idee der Persöhnlichkeit (1841). The work was an intervention in the religious-philosophical controversy that had split the Hegelian school following David Friedrich Strauss's biblical criticism, addressing the relation between "universal" and "particular" personality; in Tübingen Snellman met Strauss in person and read Ludwig Feuerbach for the first time.

Returning to Stockholm, he published his principal work of political philosophy, Läran om Staten (The Doctrine of the State), in 1842. In it Snellman departed from Hegel by complementing conceptual analysis with a historical, relativising examination of the state, and identified the level of education (Bildung) as the most important factor shaping the life of a nation.

=== Kuopio and Saima ===
By the time Snellman returned to Helsinki in 1842, the political situation did not allow the university to employ him. Instead, he took up the position of headmaster of a school in distant Kuopio and from 1844 published the starkly polemical newspapers Saima in Swedish and Maamiehen Ystävä in Finnish. Through these papers Snellman introduced modern public debate and social criticism into Finland and advocated that the educated classes should take up the language of the Finnish-speaking majority and develop Finnish into a language of academic and civic life. In doing so he explicitly drew on the contemporary national movements among the Czechs, Irish and Hungarians, applying their arguments and rhetoric to Finnish conditions.

Saima was suppressed by the government in 1846, after which Snellman continued his journalism in the periodical Litteraturblad. In 1845 he had married Johanna (Jeannette) Lovisa Wennberg (1828–1857), with whom he had several children before her death in 1857.

=== Professor and senator ===
In 1848–49 Snellman was passed over for the professorship of philosophy at the Imperial Alexander University in Helsinki, and after the death of Emperor Nicholas I in 1855 the political climate eased. In 1856 he was finally appointed professor of moral philosophy and the system of the sciences, a development welcomed by politically engaged Finns.

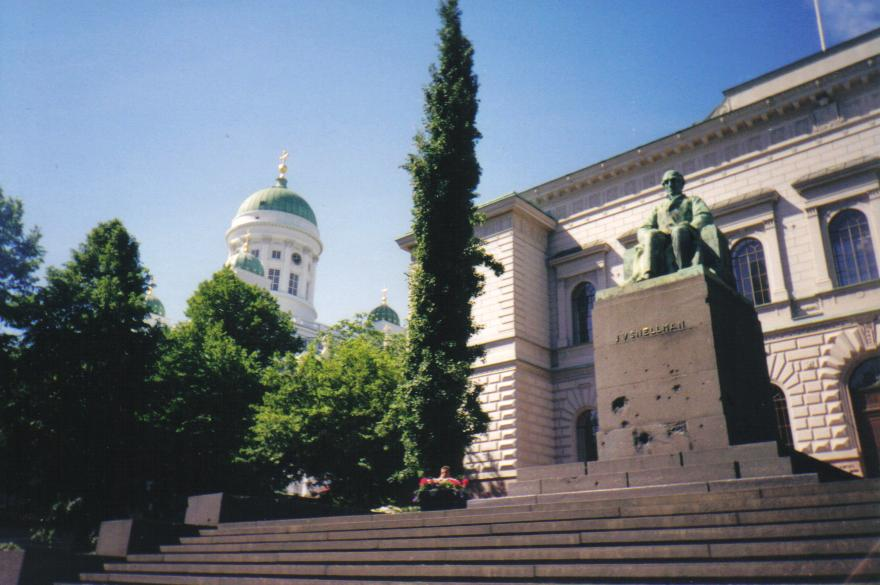
Statue of J. V. Snellman in front of the Bank of Finland, Helsinki.

In his journalism Snellman developed a realpolitik line in Finland's relationship with Russia, arguing that the country's special status could only be preserved through loyalty to the emperor while Finnish national identity and education were built up from within. This stance, which set him at odds with the rising liberal opposition, was most clearly expressed during the Polish January Uprising of 1863 in his article Krig eller fred för Finland? (War or Peace for Finland?).

In 1863 Snellman was appointed to the Senate of Finland as head of the first department of the finance committee. He worked actively for the rights of the Finnish language and contributed to the Language Decree by which Alexander II ordered that Finnish should within a fixed term become an official administrative language. A separate Finnish currency, the Finnish markka, had been introduced in 1860, originally tied to the ruble; in 1865 Snellman carried through the monetary reform that pegged it to silver instead. The reform amounted in effect to a revaluation, which proved a heavy burden during the Finnish famine of 1866–1868 but contributed in the longer term to the stabilisation of the Finnish economy.

Conflicts with the new Governor-General Nikolay Adlerberg led to Snellman being forced to request his dismissal in 1868.

=== Later years and legacy ===
Ennobled in 1866, Snellman represented the nobility at the Diets of 1867, 1872 and 1877. He served as chairman of the Finnish Literature Society from 1870 to 1874 and of the Finnish Society of Sciences and Letters in 1870–1871. He continued to take part in political debate and remained an influential figure within the Fennoman movement, but his uncompromising character also made him a polarising symbol in Finland's political life.

Snellman died at his summer residence in Kirkkonummi on 4 July 1881, shortly after Alexander II's assassination. At his funeral, Zacharias Topelius described him as "the granite, the most resolute, the most determined" of his generation. Snellman became an early cult figure within the Finnish national movement: the centenary of his birth in 1906 was marked by a mass campaign to replace Swedish family names with Finnish ones, and he became the first historical figure to appear on a banknote in independent Finland.

== Commemoration ==
Johan Vilhelm Snellman first appeared on a 1960 coin, commemorating the introduction of the markka denomination in 1860. He was later selected as the main motif for the €10 Johan Vilhelm Snellman commemorative coin, minted in 2006 to mark the 200th anniversary of his birth.

A park in Kuopio called the Snellman Park (Snellmaninpuisto) is named after him. In the centre of the park stands a bust of Snellman sculpted by Johannes Takanen, unveiled on 3 July 1886.

Snellman's birthday, 12 May, is one of Finland's flag days and is celebrated as the "Day of Finnish Identity" (also known as "Finnish Heritage Day").

== Works ==
Snellman's principal philosophical works include Försök till en framställning af Logiken (1837), the three-part Philosophisk Elementar-Curs (1837–1840), Versuch einer speculativen Entwicklung der Idee der Persöhnlichkeit (1841) and his political-philosophical magnum opus Läran om Staten (The Doctrine of the State, 1842). His collected works have been published in Swedish and Finnish editions.
