= Saima (newspaper) =

Swedish language weekly newspaper in Finland (1844–1846)

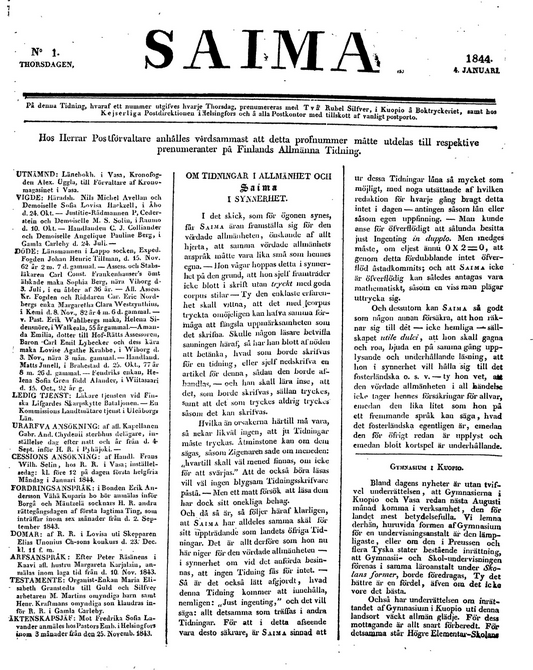
- First issue of Saima
- Type: Weekly newspaper
- Founder: Johan Vilhelm Snellman
- Founded: 4 January 1844
- Ceased publication: 31 December 1846
- Language: Swedish
- Headquarters: Kuopio
- Country: Finland

Saima was a Swedish language weekly newspaper which was published in Kuopio, Finland in the 1840s. It was one of the first Swedish language newspapers in Finland. The paper adopted the libertarian theory of the press which would lead to its closure in 1846 soon after its start in 1844.

== History and profile ==
Saima was founded by Johan Vilhelm Snellman, a Swedish-origin Finnish politician, in 1844. Its first issue appeared on 4 January 1844. Snellman was also the editor-in-chief of the paper which was one of the earliest examples of the active and critical publications. The paper was headquartered in Kuopio and came out weekly. It addressed the Swedish-speaking upper and middle classes. Soon after its start Saima became one of the leading publications in the country.

Snellman published articles on nationality, language and literature in the paper. He argued in an article in the second issue of Saima dated January 1844 that Finland did not have a national literature. The paper ceased publication in 1846 when it was banned by the Russian Governor General Aleksandr Mensjikov due to its liberal political and cultural stance which were considered to be a threat to the rule of Grand Duke of Finland, Nicholas I. The last issue of Saima appeared on 31 December 1846.
