= Matthias Calonius =

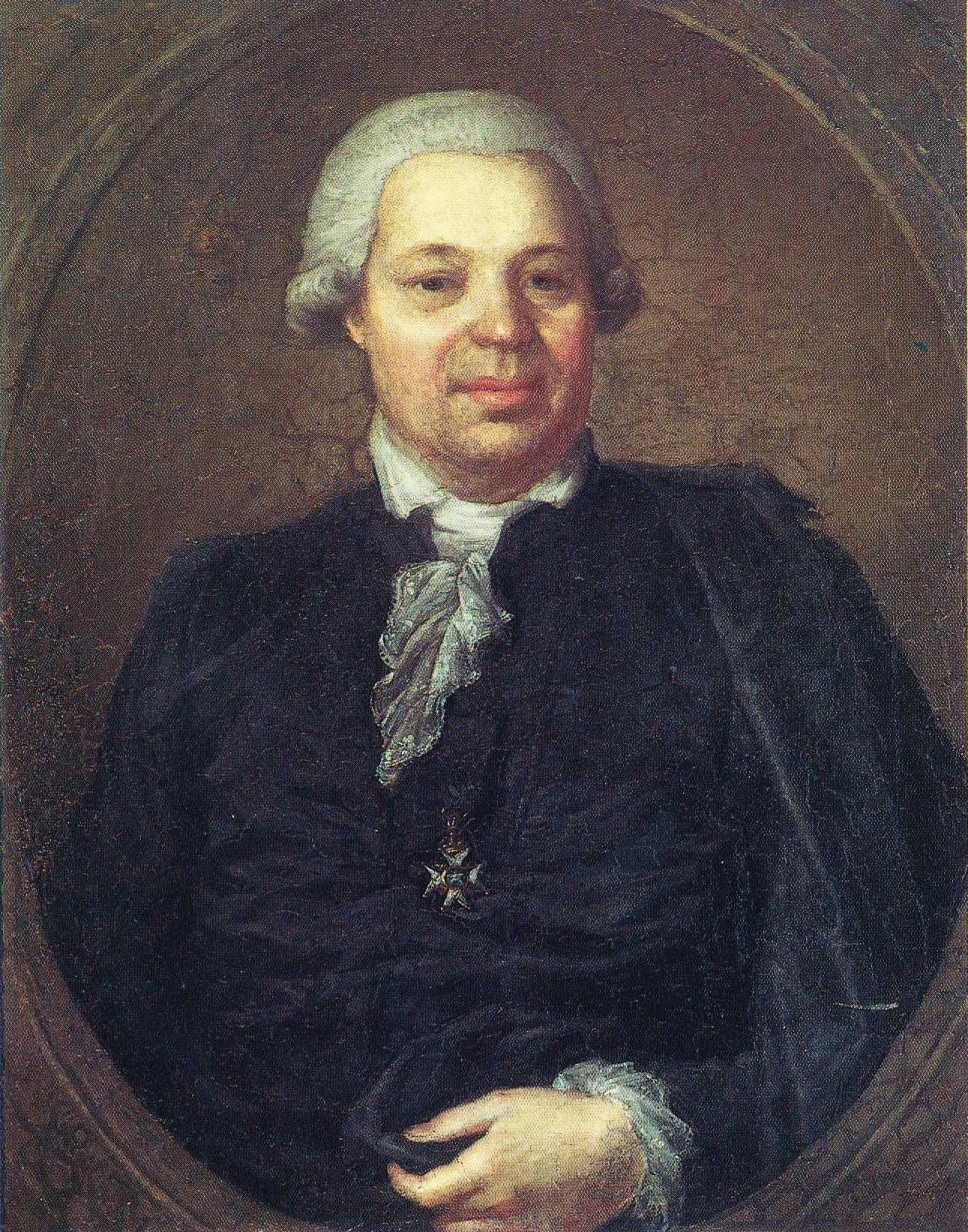

Matthias Calonius (January 7, 1738 – September 13, 1817) was Finland's most renowned jurist.

== Biography ==
Born in Saarijärvi in Central Finland as a pastor's son, Calonius was home-schooled until the age of 12, but was then sent to Porvoo Gymnasium, a school that had acquired a good reputation by then. He later studied at the Royal Academy of Turku. He went on to become a lecturer and then (in 1773) full professor at the Faculty of Law there, despite being too poor and lacking in family connections to ever obtain an academic title. He was also a member of the Supreme Court of Sweden in Stockholm and, after the Finnish War and Diet of Porvoo, procurator (chancellor of justice) with the Senate of the Grand Duchy of Finland.

Calonius's influence is mainly due to his lectures on civil law, handed down among students in the 19th century and first published in 1908 as Praelectiones in Jurisprudentiam Civilem. Characteristically for his period, he was an advocate of natural law as a transportive justification of contemporary law.

He was a member of the Aurora Society, the Royal Swedish Academy of War Sciences, the Royal Patriotic Society, and Pro Fide et Christianismo.

Calonius died in Turku in 1817.
