= Tidningar Utgifne Af et Sällskap i Åbo =

First newspaper published in Finland

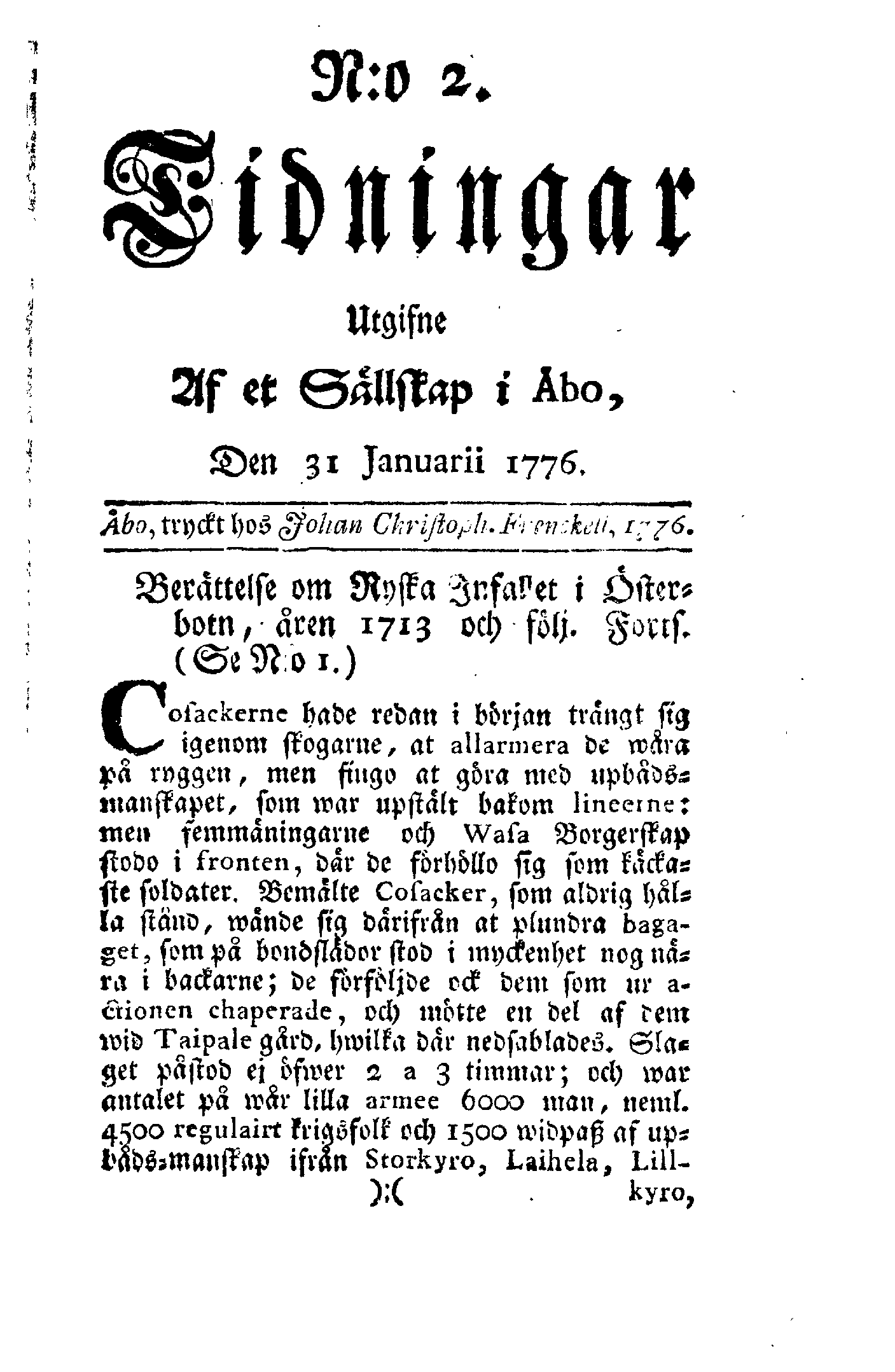
- Cover page dated 31 January 1776
- Founded: 15 January 1771
- Language: Swedish
- Ceased publication: 1785
- Headquarters: Turku, Finland

Tidningar Utgifne Af et Sällskap i Åbo was a newspaper that was first published in Finland in 1771, the first newspaper to be published in Finland. Finland was under Swedish rule at that time, and the newspaper was published in the Swedish language. It was in circulation until 1785.
