= Agathon Meurman =

Finnish politician and journalist

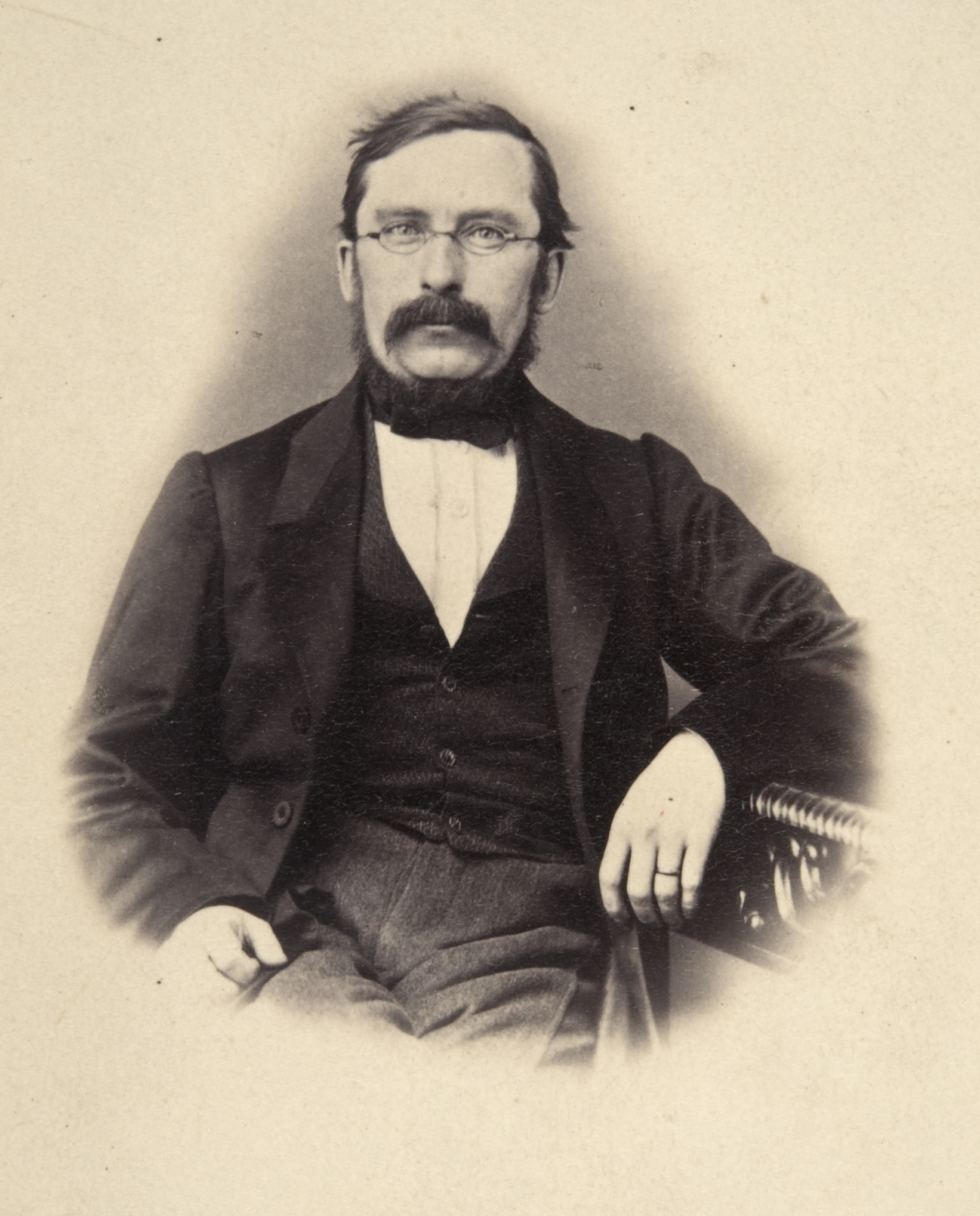
Meurman in 1865.

Agathon Meurman (9 October 1826, Kangasala – 17 January 1909, Helsinki) was a Finnish politician and journalist. He was one of the key figures of the Fennoman movement and from 1863 the leader of the Finnish Party together with Yrjö Sakari Yrjö-Koskinen.

In 1883–1890 Meurman published the first Finnish language encyclopaedia Sanakirja yleiseen sivistykseen kuuluvia tietoja varten. It was mostly based on the German Meyers Encyclopedia.

== Selected works ==
- Finnish–French Dictionary (1877)
- Sanakirja yleiseen sivistykseen kuuluvia tietoja varten (1883–1890)
- Finnish-Russian Dictionary (1885)
- Memoirs (1909)
- Om finska folkskolans organisation (1857)
- Om kronoutskylderna i Finland (1878)
- Jordlägenheternas i Finland allmänna besvär (1880)
- Isänmaan puolustuksesta (1882)
- Finland förr och nu (1890)
- Hungeråren på 1860-talet (1892)
- Ehtoollispakko ja eriuskolaislaki (1893)
- Huru finska språket blef officielt (1893)
- Kuinka suomenkieli pääsi viralliseksi (1893)
- Juha Pynninen ja kansakirjastot (1895)
- Venäläis-suomalainen sanakirja (1895)
- Johan Wilhelm Snellman (1901)
- J.W. Snellman (1901)
- Martti Luther (1901)
- Martin Luther(1902)
- Elämän-kysymyksiä yksinkertaisia varten (1903)
- Siivosta esiintymisestä (1904)
- Nykyisten kauheuksien juuret Itämeren maakunnissa (1906)
- Kreivi N.L. Zinzendorfin elämänvaiheet (1908)
- Maa kuuluu kaikille (1908)
- Säästäväisyydestä ja säästöpankeista (1908)
- Muistelmia (1909)
