= Albert Lilius =

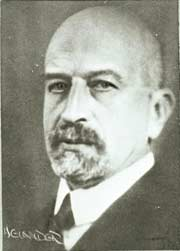
- Born: 7 December 1873; Hamina, Finland
- Died: 31 October 1947 (aged 73); Helsinki
- Scientific career
- Fields: Psychology
- Workplaces: University of Helsinki

Albert Henrik Lilius (7 December 1873, in Hamina – 31 October 1947, in Helsinki) was a child psychologist a pioneering researcher in Finland and professor at the University of Helsinki. He published a book about Nordic figures from the history of educational work along with several others.
