= Young Finnish Party =

- Leader: Pehr Evind Svinhufvud; Kaarlo Juho Ståhlberg; Jonas Castrén
- Founded: 1878
- Dissolved: 1918
- Split from: Finnish Party
- Succeeded by: National Coalition Party; National Progressive Party
- Ideology: Liberalism; Finnish nationalism

The Young Finnish Party or Constitutional-Fennoman Party (Finnish: Nuorsuomalainen Puolue or Perustuslaillis-Suomenmielinen Puolue) was a liberal and nationalist political party in the Grand Duchy of Finland. It began as an upper-class reformist movement during the 1870s and formed as a political party in 1894.

== Background ==
Industrialization and opening of the Finnish economy by Emperor Alexander II gave room for liberal economic thinking. The Young Finns opposed on constitutional basis Russification efforts commenced by Emperor Nicholas II during 1899–1905. During that period various political factions joined the movement and they were held together by a common opponent, the autocratic Russian Empire. The movement separated itself from the main Fennoman movement, the Finnish Party due to political competition between two political generations that had differing views on Finland's constitutional status in the Russian Empire.

In 1907, after a general strike that finished the first Russification period and brought parliamentary democracy with universal suffrage and a unicameral parliament to Finland, the Young Finnish Party took part in the first Finnish parliamentary election as a liberal-minded centrist party. However, already during the 19th century there had been disputes inside the party over its political line, and after the pressure by Russia eased the major differences between the separate groups became open and there was even discussion of establishing two completely separate factions or parties. The party was formally kept together, but was split in two major groups: the "sparrows" (varpuset) led by Kaarlo Juho Ståhlberg and the "swallows" (pääskyt) led by Jonas Castrén and Pehr Evind Svinhufvud. The "sparrows" were a liberal faction seeking social liberalism and social reforms. They were initially oriented in foreign policy toward the United Kingdom and France, but after the Finnish Civil War of 1918 their support for Germany substantially increased. The members of the "swallows" were mainly conservative, part fundamentally conservative and part economically liberal, who did not emphasize the need for social reforms. During World War I and especially after the Civil War, they leaned on Germany. Svinhufvud strongly favored the German Empire and supported a monarchist political system for Finland. Ståhlberg urged full democracy and the formation of a republic in Finland. During the hegemony of Germany in 1918, the monarchists won the political battle and a clear majority of the Young Finns voted for a German prince Friedrich Karl to become the King of Finland. Only Ståhlberg and few other Young Finns voted against monarchy during the crucial election.

== End of the party ==
After Germany's defeat in the Great War in late 1918, the Young Finnish Party finally split into two new parties. A minority of members joined Svinhufvud in forming the conservative, monarchist National Coalition Party (together with the majority of the Finnish Party), while the majority joined Ståhlberg in forming the liberal, republican National Progressive Party. After the defeat of the German Empire in World War I, the monarchist policy had collapsed and Ståhlberg, as the first President of Finland elected on 25 July 1919, became the leader of the Republic of Finland.

A small economically right-wing party with the same name, Young Finns, was established in the 1990s. The newer party gained two seats in the Parliament, but lost them in the next elections.

== See also ==
- Liberalism
- Contributions to liberal theory
- Liberalism worldwide
- List of liberal parties
- Liberal democracy
- Liberalism and centrism in Finland

== Literature ==
- Vesa Vares (2000): Varpuset ja pääskyt. Nuorsuomalaisuus ja Nuorsuomalainen puolue 1870-luvulta vuoteen 1918. ISBN 951-746-161-5
