= Mikko Rimminen =

Finnish novelist and poet (born 1975)

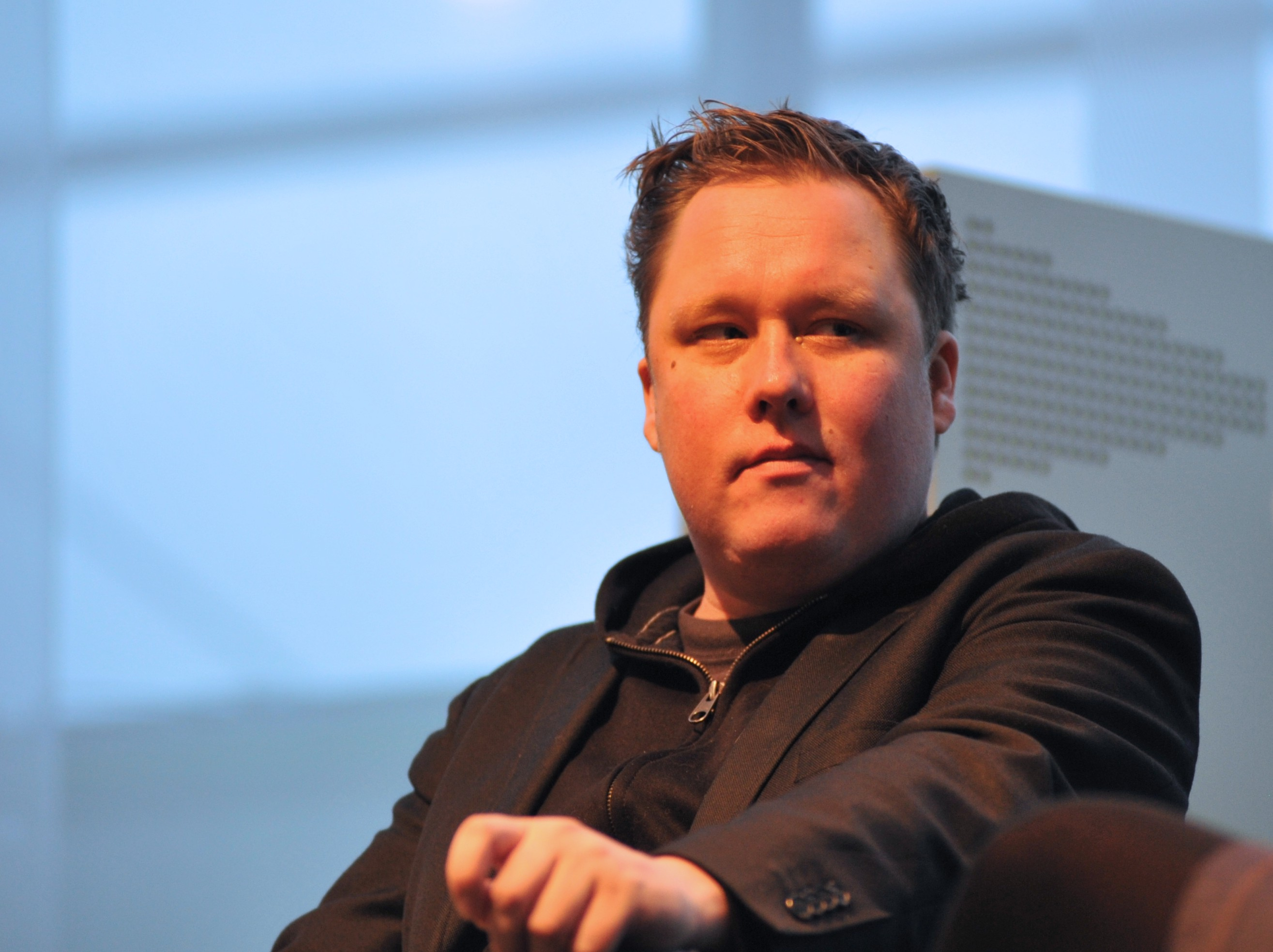
Mikko Rimminen

Mikko Rimminen (born 1975) is a Finnish novelist and poet. He won the Finlandia Prize for the novel Nenäpäivä or Red Nose Day.
