= Aurora Society =

Coordinates: 60.4514°N 22.2735°E

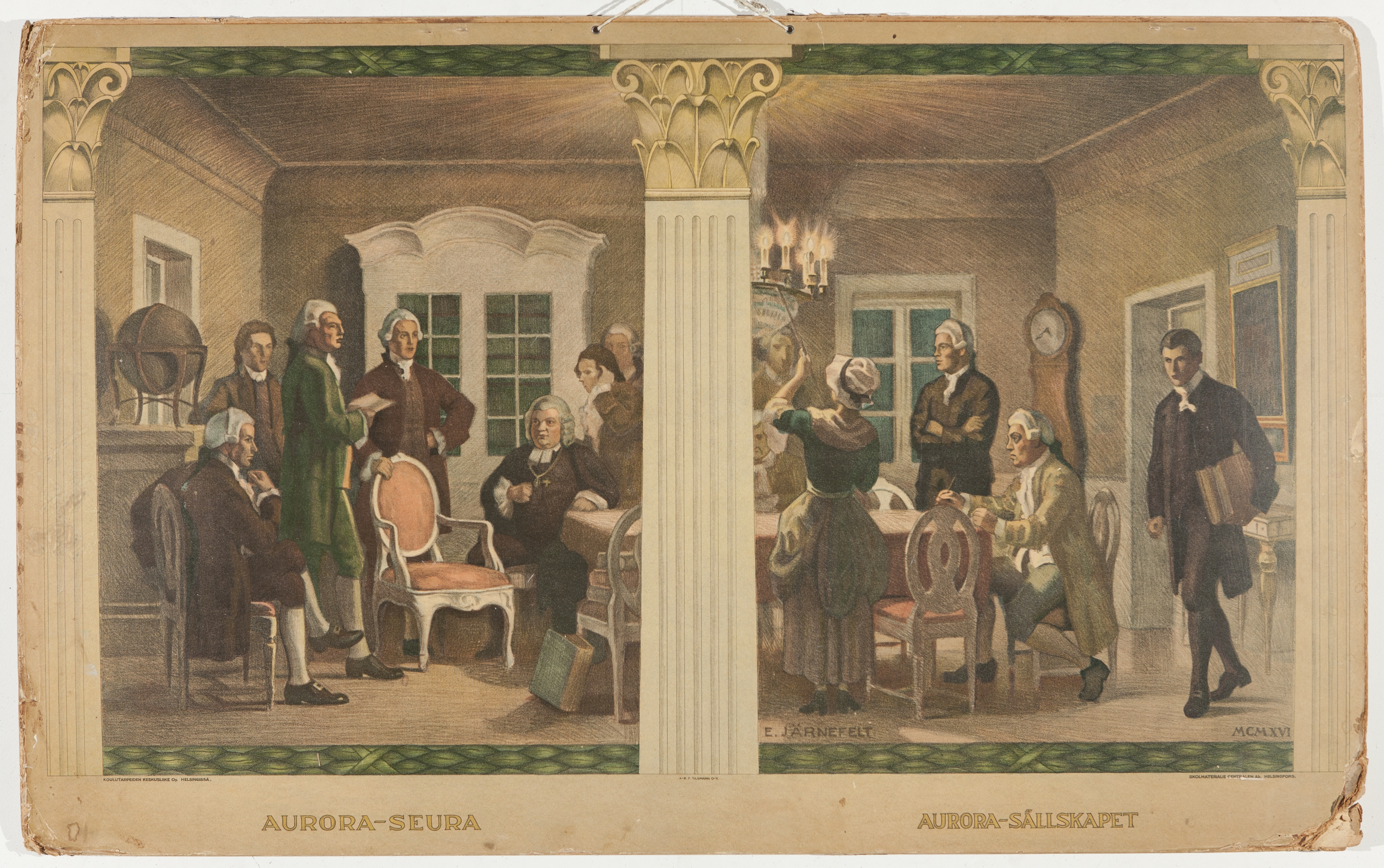
Aurora Society, educational poster by Eero Järnefelt, 1916

Aurora Society was a secret society and a national Finnish literary society at the Royal Academy of Turku from 1770 to 1779. The Society consisted of many prominent members of the Finnish cultural sphere and had as its focal points poetry, Finnish history, geography and the research of language and economy.

The Society published Finland's first newspaper, Åbo Tidningar (Tidningar Utgifne Af et Sällskap i Åbo), between the years 1771 to 1778, and 1782 to 1785.

Furthermore, the first public orchestra concerts in Finland were also organized by the Aurora Society.

The society was a typical product of the Enlightenment period: a secret society on one hand and a cultural and educational organization on the other.

== Members ==
- Henrik Gabriel Porthan
- Johan Lilius
- Abraham Niklas Edelcrantz
- Matthias Calonius
- Carl Fredrik Fredenheim
- Magnus Jacob Alopaeus

== See also ==
- Secret society
