= Irmelin Sandman Lilius =

Swedish-speaking Finnish writer (born 1936)

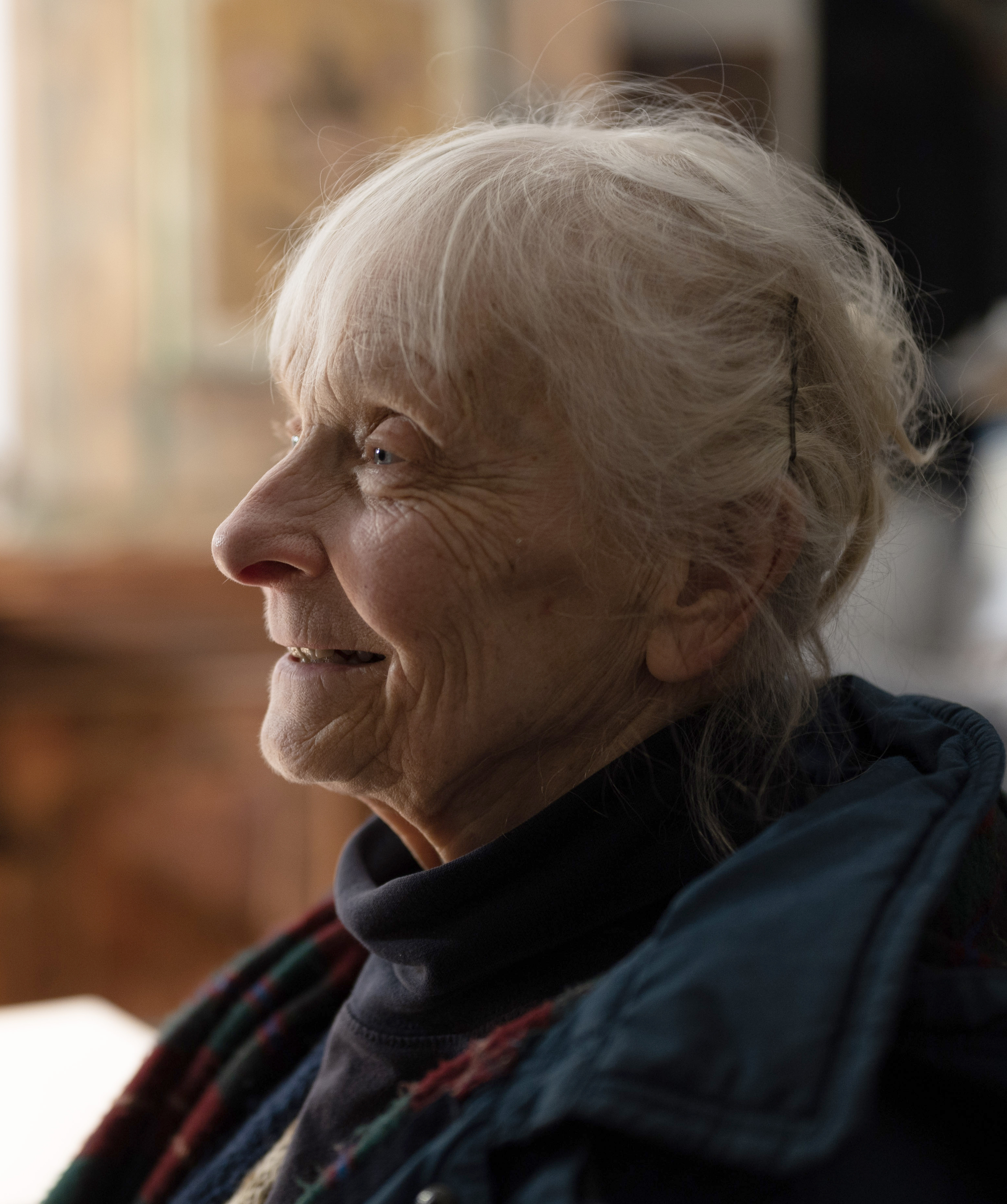

Rut Irmelin Sandman Lilius (born 14 June 1936) is a Swedish-speaking Finnish writer.

== Biography ==
Irmelin Sandman was born in Helsinki. Her first book, Trollsång, was published in 1955. She has written picture books and novels for children as well as books for adults and poetry, and she also works as a translator and reviewer. Among her best-known works is the large chronicle about the fictive town of Tulavall on the south coast of Finland, which she has described in different times and from the point of view of different people, in more than a dozen books. She has also written several self-biographical works (some together with her sister Heddi), as well as novels with a heroine based on her daughter.

In 1957, she married the painter and sculptor Carl-Gustaf Lilius, and they were married until his death in 1998. In 2003, the first volume of her biography of her husband was published, with the title Sjutusen år (English: "Seven Thousand Years"); the fourth and final volume was published in 2017.

Her books have been translated into 16 languages. Among the literary awards she has received are the Swedish awards Nils Holgersson Plaque (in 1972) and the Astrid Lindgren Prize (in 1976), and the Finnish award Topeliuspriset (in 1980).

Sandman Lilius was also on the IBBY Honour List for 1974 and 2002.
