= Henrik Gabriel Porthan =

Finnish professor and rector (1739–1804)

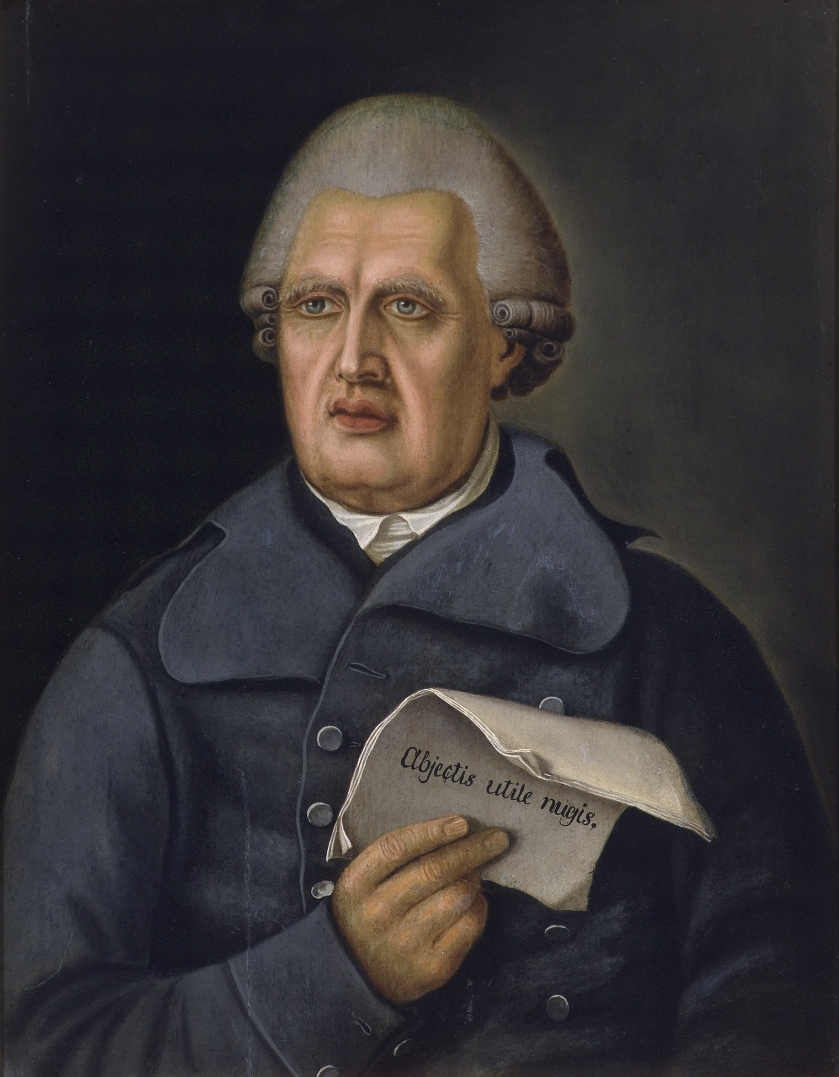
Porthan, portrait by Johan Erik Hedberg

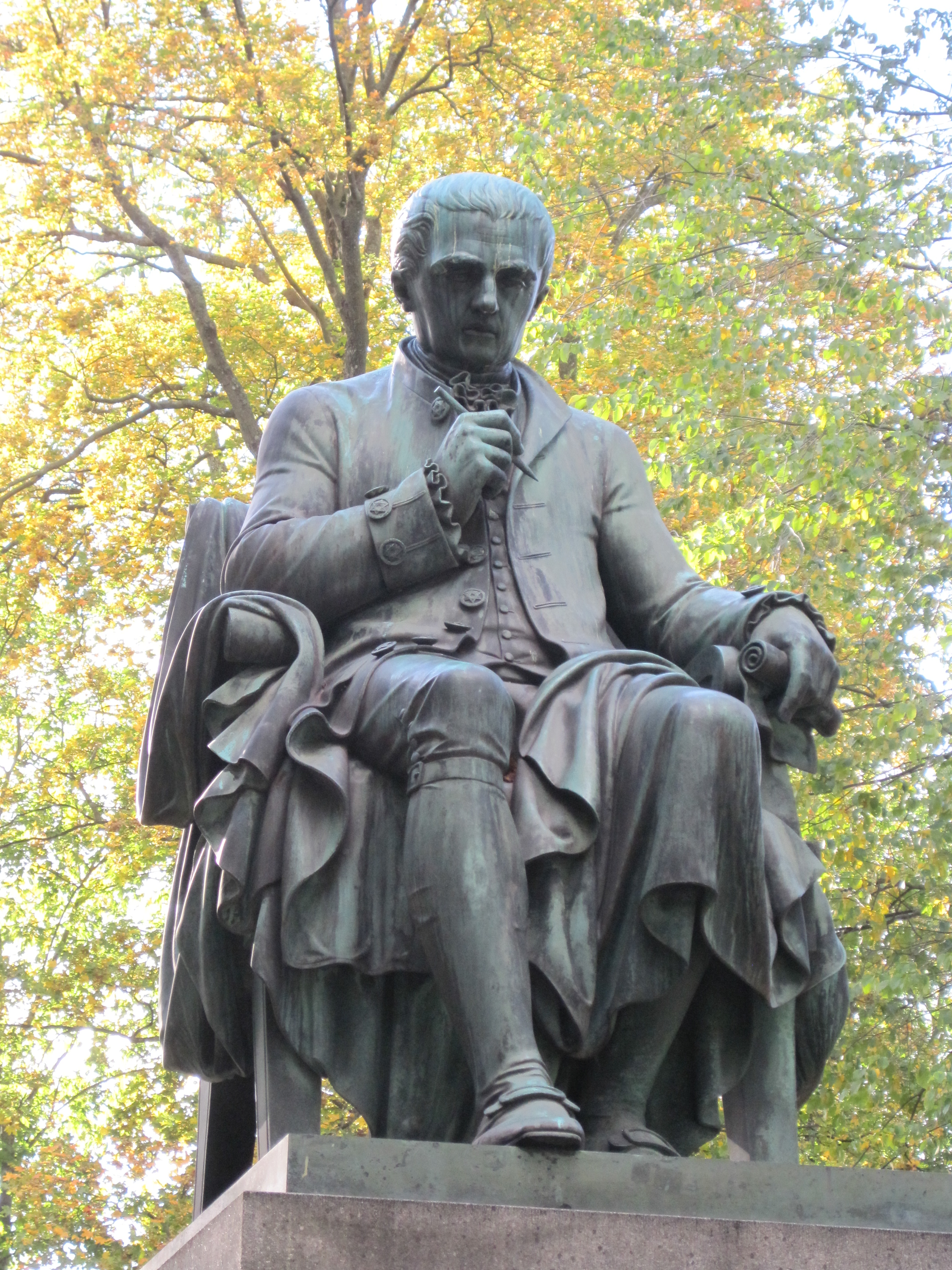
Statue of Henrik Gabriel Porthan at Turku by Carl Eneas Sjöstrand (1864)

Henrik Gabriel Porthan (8 November 1739 – 16 March 1804) was a professor and rector at the Royal Academy of Turku, Finland, which was then part of the Kingdom of Sweden. He was a scholar sometimes known as The Father of Finnish History. Porthan's legacy greatly influenced the rise of the Finnish national culture and romanticism of the early 19th century.

== Biography ==
He was born at Viitasaari in Tavastia, Finland. His parents were Sigfrid Porthan and Kristina Juslenius. His father was a vicar who became mentally ill in 1744. He was raised by his uncle Gustaf Juslenius (1702–1774) who was the vicar of Kronoby in Ostrobothnia County. In 1754, at the age of 15, Porthan entered the Royal Academy of Turku (now University of Helsinki). He was a student of professor Daniel Juslenius (1676–1752) who later served as the Bishop of Borgå.

Porthan was awarded his Master of Philosophy in 1760. In 1762, he became an associate professor. He was a professor 1777–1804 and served as rector 1786–1787 and 1798–1799.

He became a Fennophile and brought Finnish history-writing, study of mythology and folk poetry, and other humanistic sciences to an international level. His De Poësi Fennica (published in five parts 1776-78), a study on Finnish folk poetry, had great importance in awakening public interest in the Kalevala-poetry and Finnish mythology, and the study was also the basis of all later study of the poetry.

He was among the founders of the Aurora Society that advocated Finnish literary pursuits and was the editor of the first Finnish newspaper, Tidningar ugifne af et sällskap i Åbo, founded in 1771. He instructed Kristian Erik Lencqvist (1761–1808) whose 1782 dissertation De superstitione veterum Fennorum theoretica et practica was a seminal study of historic Finnish customs.

Porthan was also the instructor of poet Frans Mikael Franzén (1772–1847) and also inspired the following generation of Finnish authors, poets and researchers, many of whom were among the founders of the Finnish Literature Society in 1831.

Porthan died in Turku in 1804.

The Porthania building of the University of Helsinki is named after Porthan.

== Editions ==
The main edition of Porthan's works remains Opera selecta. Skrifter i urval, ed. by Sven Gabriel Elmgren and Josef August Schauman, 5 vols (Helsingfors: Finska Litteratur-Sällskapets tryckeri, 1859–73). Scans of the original publications are now available via http://www.doria.fi.
