= Eno Kalle =

Finnish poet and broadside ballader

- Born: Kalle Johansson; 1884; Klaukkala, Finland
- Died: 1941 (aged 56–57); Perttula, Finland
- Other name: Eno-Kalle Runolinna
- Occupation: poet

Kalle (Karl) Johansson, better known as Eno Kalle or Eno-Kalle Runolinna (1884–1941) was a Finnish poet who lived mainly in the village of Lepsämä in Nurmijärvi, Finland. Eno Kalle wrote songs and broadside ballads which were also published in printed booklets. He also toured himself to present his ballads. A total of 14 ballads were born, covering topics such as love, war, liquor and prohibition, travel and the shipwreck of the SS Kuru in 1929. Even the Simola croft's massacre of Klaukkala in 1899 also ended up being the subject of ballad.
