= Kuhakoski =

Rapids in the country of Finland

Coordinates: 60°25.9614′N 024°42.7601′E

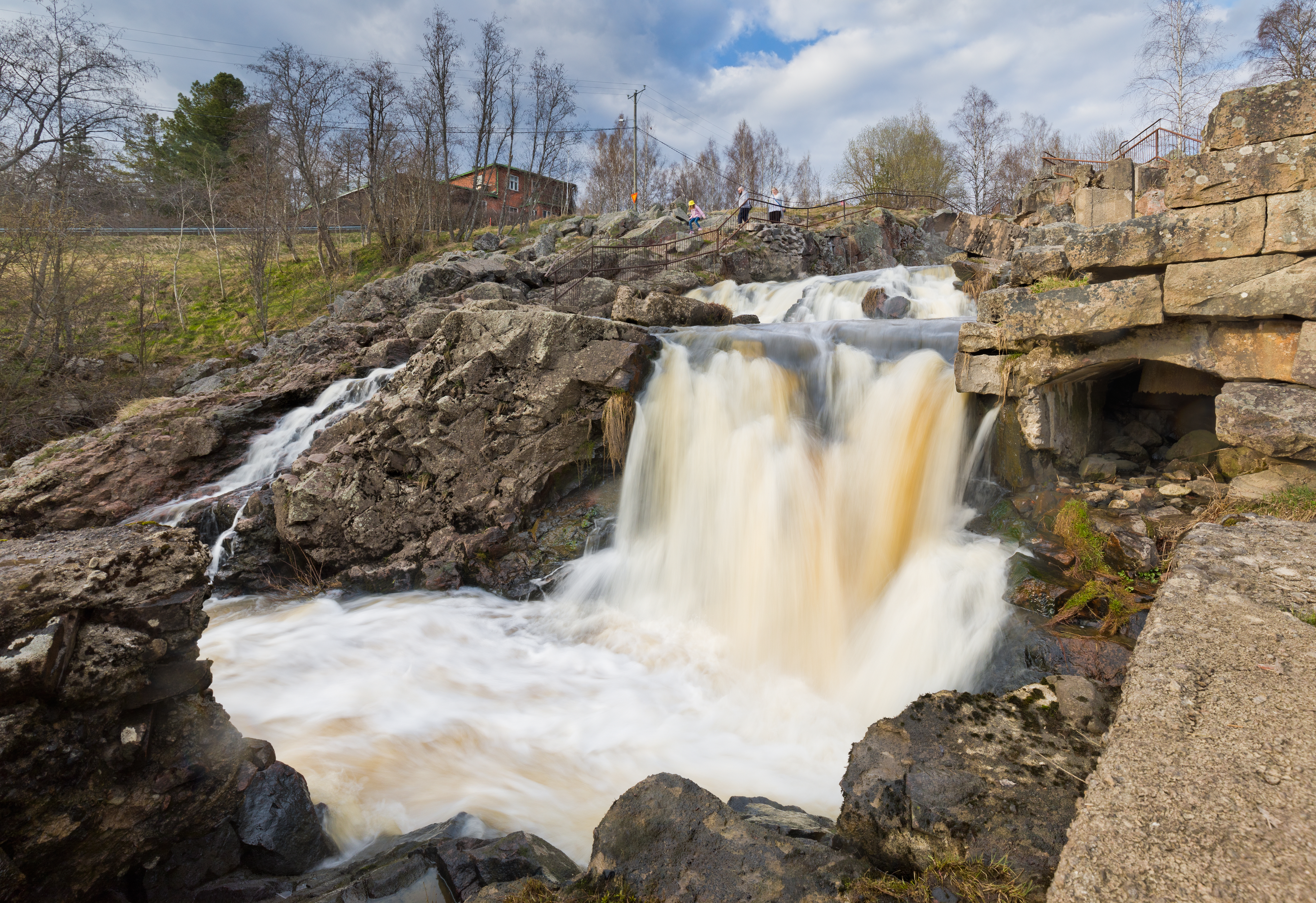
A waterfall at Kuhakoski

Kuhakoski (Finnish pronunciation: [ˈkuhɑˌkoski]; literally meaning "zander rapids") is a rapids near the village of Perttula in Nurmijärvi, Finland. It is located in the immediate vicinity of the Numlahti Manor and the Regional Road 132, 34 kilometres (21 mi) north of Helsinki. At the same time, Kuhakoski is the largest waterfall in the entire Uusimaa region, as it has a height of 16 meters. It is part of the Vantaa River watershed, which descends stepwise to Lake Valkjärvi with a length of 150 meters.

The rapids themselves start from a river excavated into the rock, to which the water of the Luhtajoki River flows soon after crossing the Loppi Road and then the old stone arch bridge. After the rocky outcrop, the water falls down in three large stumps, then bubbling through the woods into a rural landscape filled with fields. The field before the Loppi Road undercut by the rapids is the former drained Lake Kuhajärvi.

Kuhakoski's waterfalls has played an important part in the history of Nurmijärvi, as the rapids were once the most important mill rapids in the area. Since the beginning of the 16th century, four separate mills (the mills of the villages of Perttula, Uotila, Valkjärvi and Numlahti) and later also sawmilling have been operated in the rapids. In 1910, a small power plant was built in Kuhakoski by the Perttula and Uotila houses. The operation of the power plant continued until 1952. Even today, the foundations and ruins of the mills can be seen in the waterfall, reminiscent of the industrial history of the rapids. Other identifiable landmarks include the semi-two-storey brick building above the Valkjärventie road above the rapids, which was a former machine and car repair shop in Perttula from 1937 to 1972.

In the northern part of the rapids, and especially in its eastern part, there is dry meadow, and on the rock along the rapids, bluebells and maiden pinks grow, among other things.
