= Euronics =

International electrical retail group

Euronics International Ltd.
- Type: Private Ltd.
- Industry: Retail
- Founded: 1990; 36 years ago
- Headquarters: Amsterdam, Netherlands
- Number of locations: 11,000 outlets (2016)
- Area served: Worldwide
- Products: White goods, brown/black goods, telecommunications, information technology
- Revenue: ▲€18.8 Billion (2011); €19.1 Billion (2010)
- Number of employees: 50,000 staff (2016)
- Website: www.euronics.com

Euronics International Ltd. is an international association of over 11,000 independent electrical retailers in 37 countries. It functions as a leading international electrical retail group on behalf of its members, and is based in Amsterdam. It operates as a European Economic Interest Grouping entity (an EEIG) meaning that all stores are independent sellers.

== History ==
Euronics International was founded in 1990 by five national groups from Germany, Italy, Spain, Belgium and the Netherlands. The groups realized at the time that they had to react to the structural changes brought about by globalization to remain competitive. At the same time they would preserve the advantages of specialising in the trade of mainly electronics by maintaining qualified employees, specialist knowledge and personal customer service.

The five groups formed an EEIG in order to have the flexibility of having separate businesses, as well as each business having local knowledge of their area, but the buying power and branding involved with having a single entity.

== National organisations ==
The list of national organizations belonging to Euronics International Ltd. currently are:

Country	Company name	Brands(s)	Branches
Austria	Euronics Austria reg. Genossenschaft m.b.H.	Euronics XXL, Red Zac, Partner of Euronics	234
Bahrain	Sharaf DG (sublicensed from UAE)		see United Arab Emirates below
Belgium	Euronics Belgium cvba	Selexion, Selexion Clix, Euronics, Top Camera	386
Cyprus	Seios SYN.P.E.(sublicensed from Greece)	Euronics	2
Czech Republic	Euronics ČR	Euronics	166
Denmark	El-Salg	El-Salg	212
Egypt	Sharaf DG (sublicensed from UAE)		see United Arab Emirates below
Estonia	Euronics Baltic Ltd.	Euronics	16
Finland	Kauppiasosuuskunta Tekniset	Euronics, Tekniset	63
France	Euronics France	Euronics, Euronics City, Gitem, Boulanger	444
Germany	Euronics Deutschland e.G.	Euronics, Euronics XXL, Media@home	1768
Greece	Seios SYN.P.E.	Euronics	159
Hungary	Vöröskő Kft.	Euronics	118
Ireland	Electrobuy Ltd.	Euronics	47
Italy	Euronics Italia S.p.A.	Euronics, Euronics XXL, Euronics Point, Euronics City	595
Kazakhstan	Arena S LLP Gulser Computers LLP		see United Arab Emirates below
Kyrgyzstan	Arena S LLP		see United Arab Emirates below
Latvia	Euronics Baltic Ltd. (sublicensed from Estonia)	Euronics	7
Lithuania	TC prekyba, JSC (sublicensed from Estonia)	Euronics, Topo Centras	34
Luxembourg	(Sublicensed from Belgium)	Selexion, Selexion Clix	5
Malta		Euronics (Opening Soon In St George's Mall)	Soon 1
Moldova	(Sublicensed from Ukraine)	Foxmart	4
Netherlands	United Holding B.V.	Euronics, Electro World, CombiFoto, ElektroVakman, Audio-Video Specialist, Witgoed specialist	417
Norway	Elon Norge	Elon	66
Oman	Sharaf DG (sublicensed from UAE)		see United Arab Emirates below
Poland	Mediaexpert Sp. z o.o.	Media Expert	355
Portugal	Associação dos Agentes Autorizados	Euronics	116
Russia	Expert Retail	Euronics, Expert	397
San Marino	(Sublicensed from Italy)	Euronics	1
Slovakia	Euronics SK	Euronics	57
Spain	Sinersis	Tien 21, Confort Electrodomesticos	348
Spain	Sinersis	Tien21, Milar, Confort Electrodomesticos, Ivarte	1583
Spain	Consorcio Euronics Espana, A.I.E.	Euronics	1244
Sweden	Elon Elkedjan Logistic AB	ELON, Elkedjan	430
Sweden	Euronics Sverige	Euronics	88
Switzerland	EURONICS Schweiz AG	Euronics, IF Interfunk, Media@home	219
Tunisia	(Sublicensed from France)	Euronics	1
Turkey	Teknosa	Teknosa	292
Ukraine	Foxtrot Home Appliances	Foxtrot	224
United Arab Emirates	Sharaf DG (sublicensed from UAE)	There are currently 33 Sharaf DG stores in total	
United Arab Emirates	Akcell Electronics Trading LLC (sublicensed from UAE)	There are currently 1 branch Akcell Electronics Trading LLC in total	
United Kingdom	Combined Independents (Holdings) Ltd.	Euronics	600+

== Euronics in Italy ==
Euronics Italia SpA represents Euronics International's second largest shareholder by turnover, second only to Germany. It is one of the largest groups in the distribution of household appliances and consumer electronics. Euronics Italia was formed in September 1999 from the GET brand, established in 1972, when the demand for household appliances, color televisions and hi-fi systems became increasingly significant.

=== The members of Euronics Italia ===
Euronics Italia SpA is a group made up of 11 members distributed throughout Italy, including a total of 420 stores as of March 2018.

- Bruno SpA
- Butali SpA
- Castoldi Srl (which was admitted to the group in November 2018 by the Court of Monza to compensate creditors after an agreement was found with the company Binova, a subsidiary of the Nova consumer electronics group, this led to Euronics Italia taking over ten stores)
- Dimo SpA
- Galimberti SpA (which requested to join Euronics Italia as part of bankruptcy measures decided with the bankruptcy court of Milan in February 2018, providing for the closure of 11 stores, the maintenance of 11 stores as part of Euronics Italia and the sale of 6)
- The Via Lattea SpA
- Nova SpA
- Rimep SpA
- SIEM SpA
- Tufano SpA
- Binova

=== Diversification of brands ===
Euronics is represented in Italy by four brands:

Brand	Quantity	Description
Euronics	237	Large retail outlets, mainly located in shopping centers.
Euronics City	39	The first in Europe to experiment with this format, they are medium sized outlets mainly located in urban centers.
Euronics Point	126	Smaller stores, located in medium to small lots, often in urban areas in each province.

=== Turnover in Italy ===
Year	Revenue (in billions of €)
2014	1.5
2015	1.8
2016	1.8
2017	1.7
2018	1.65

== Euronics in the Baltics ==
Euronics entered the Estonian market in 2003 and is now represented by 19 stores. There are 6 Euronics stores in Latvia and 4 in Lithuania. There are a total of 29 Euronics brand stores operating in the Baltics.

The chain of Euronics stores also includes PlussMiinus stores, of which there is one in Estonia.

== Euronics in Norway ==
Euronics Norge AS is originally a Norwegian company headquartered in Fredrikstad. On January 1, 2016, Euronics Norge AS formally became a subsidiary of Swedish Elon Group AB.

The company operates consumer electronics and home appliances sales through 50 stores in Norway as of October 2018.

In January 2019, Euronics Norge changed its name to Elon.

== Euronics in Finland ==
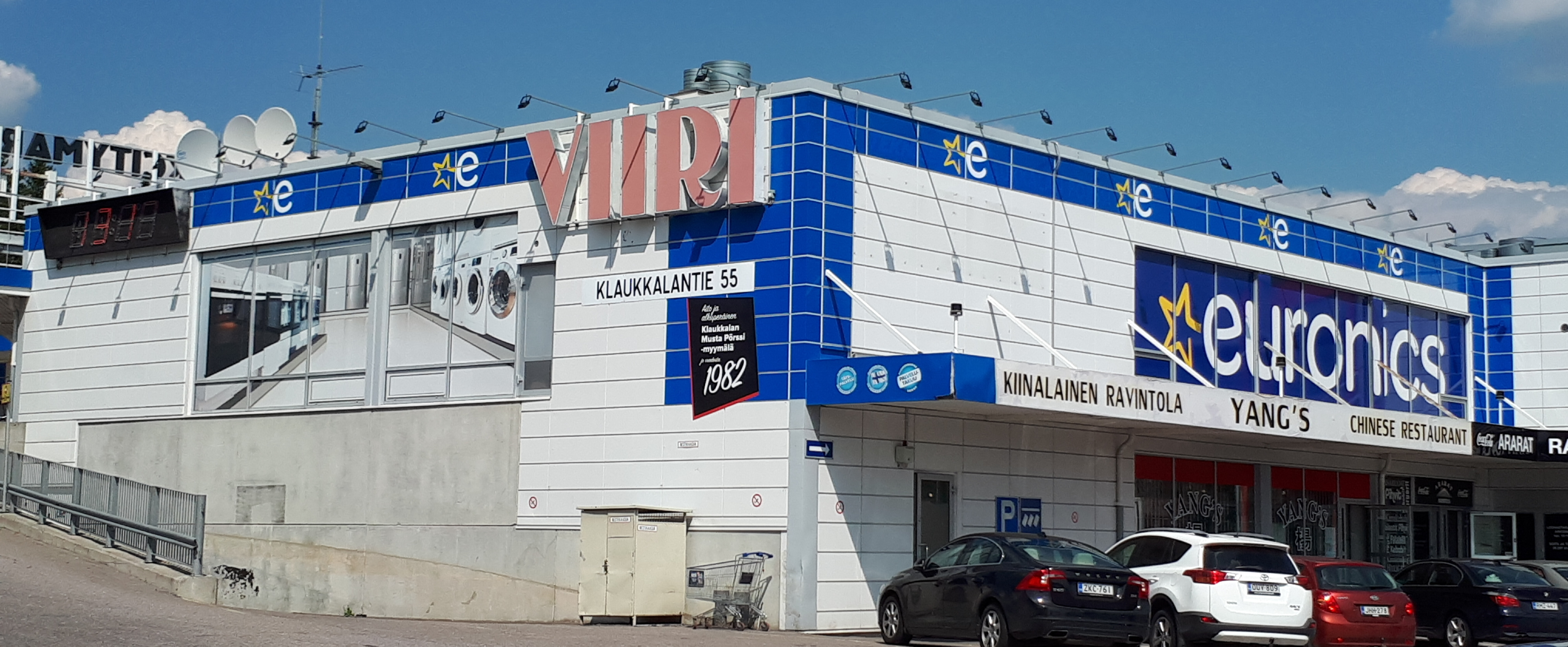
Euronics store at the Viiri shopping center in Klaukkala, Finland

Euronics in Finland is managed by the Merchant Cooperative Tekniset (Kauppiasosuuskunta Tekniset). There are almost 60 Euronics and Technical stores in Finland.

== Evolution of the logo ==

Logo used from 1999 until April 2018
Logo used from the 23rd of April 2018
