= Perttula =

Rural village in Nurmijärvi, Finland

Coordinates: 60°27′0″N 24°42′0″E

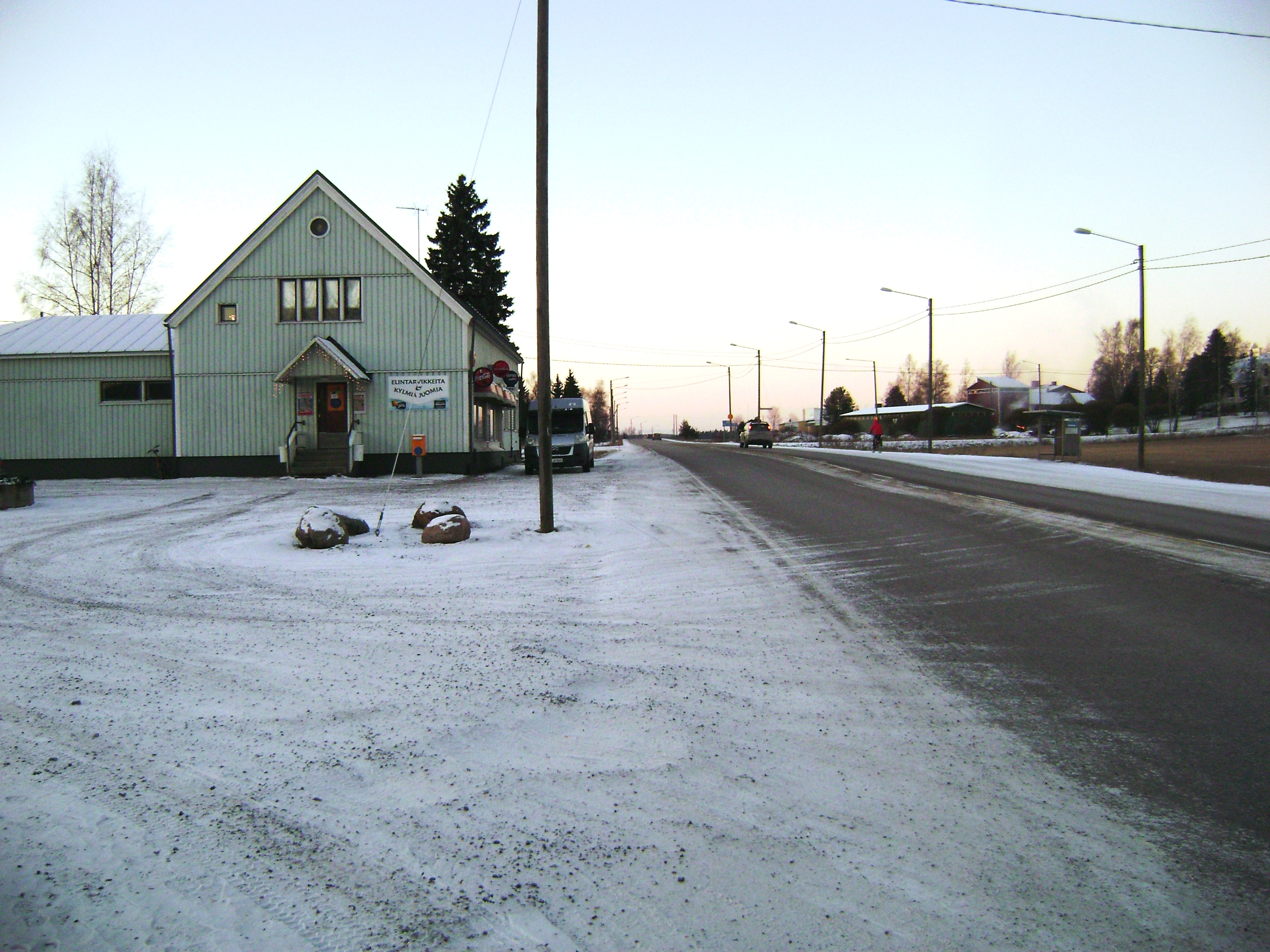
The center of Perttula.

Perttula (Finnish: [ˈpertːulɑ]; Swedish: Bertby, Finland Swedish: [ˈbæʈbyː]) is a rural village along the Lopentie road in Nurmijärvi, Finland. Living is focused to agriculture. It's rounded neighboring villages like Uotila, Numlahti, Valkjärvi and Nummenpää. Nurmijärvi's largest village Klaukkala is located 8 kilometres (5.0 mi) southeast of Perttula.

Like a lake who gave the municipality its name, there was another lake near the Perttula village called Kuhajärvi, which was also drained in the early 20th century.

Swedish-Finnish composer Bernhard Crusell lived in part of his childhood in Perttula.

The Nurmijärvi Association of Peace (Nurmijärven Rauhanyhdistys) run by Conservative Laestadians is located in Perttula along the Loppi Road.

== See also ==
- Kuhakoski
- Nurmijärvi (village)
- Perttula executions
