= Klaukkala Orthodox Church =

- St. Nectarios Church
- Finnish: Klaukkalan ortodoksinen kirkko Pyhän Nektarios Eginalaisen kirkko Swedish: Klövskog ortodoxa kyrka Sankt Nektarios kyrka
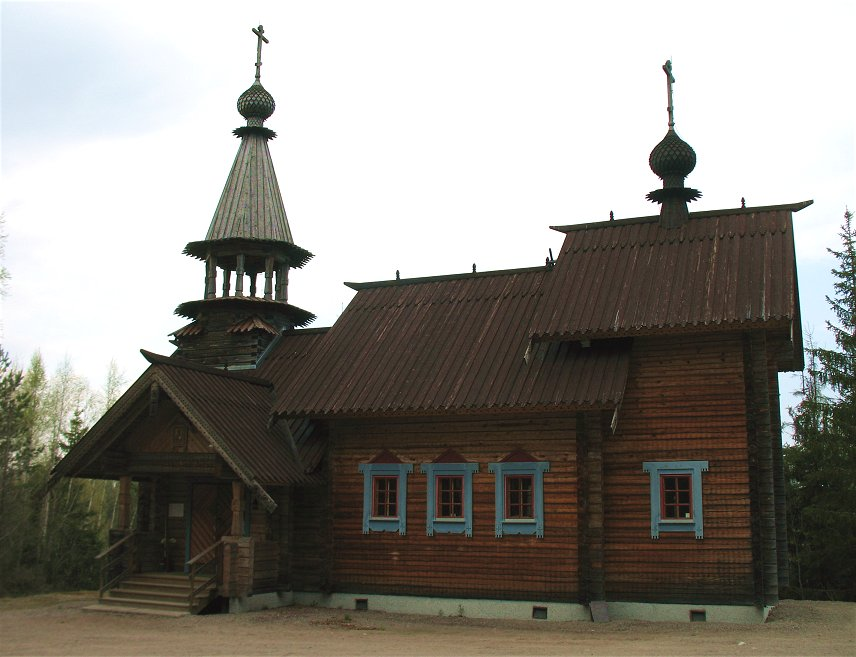
- Klaukkala Orthodox Church
- 60°22′25.6″N 24°44′37.0″E
- Location: Klaukkala, Nurmijärvi, Uusimaa
- Address: Kuonomäentie 80
- Country: Finland
- Website: www.hos.fi

History
- Dedication: Nectarios of Aegina
- Consecrated: 3 September 1995; 30 years ago (as eukteria); 9 November 1997; 28 years ago (as church)

Architecture
- Architect: Ritva Westermark
- Completed: 1995

Administration
- Diocese: Eparchy of Helsinki
- Parish: Helsinki Orthodox Parish

The Klaukkala Orthodox Church (Finnish: Klaukkalan ortodoksinen kirkko; Swedish: Klövskog ortodoxa kyrka), also known as St. Nectarios Church (Finnish: Pyhän Nektarios Eginalaisen kirkko; Swedish: Sankt Nektarios kyrka), is the 20th-century wooden Orthodox church located in Klaukkala, an urban area in the Nurmijärvi municipality in Uusimaa, Finland. The church was named after the Greek saint Nectarios of Aegina. The church also keeps the relic of Nectarios.

Kermesse is celebrated in the church annually on 9 November.

== History ==
Klaukkala's Orthodox circle of friends, who called themselves the "Nektarios group", collected money for their own church since 1986. In 1993, a church premises was acquired in Klaukkala along the Kuonomäentie road. A log building designed by architect Ritva Westermark was built in the estate, with a lot of savings and communal work. The traveler's cross, domes, bell tower and porch pillars were made by Johannes Andrejev. The icons of the iconostasis and the altar icon were painted by Aleksander Wikström.

When the building was completed in 1995, it originally served as an eukteria, but it was officially consecrated as a church by Archbishop Leo on 9 November 1997. The church became part of the Helsinki Orthodox Parish.

== See also ==
- Klaukkala Church
- Orthodox Church of Finland
