= Klaukkala Church =

Church in Uusimaa, Finland

Coordinates: 60.382778°N 24.750833°E

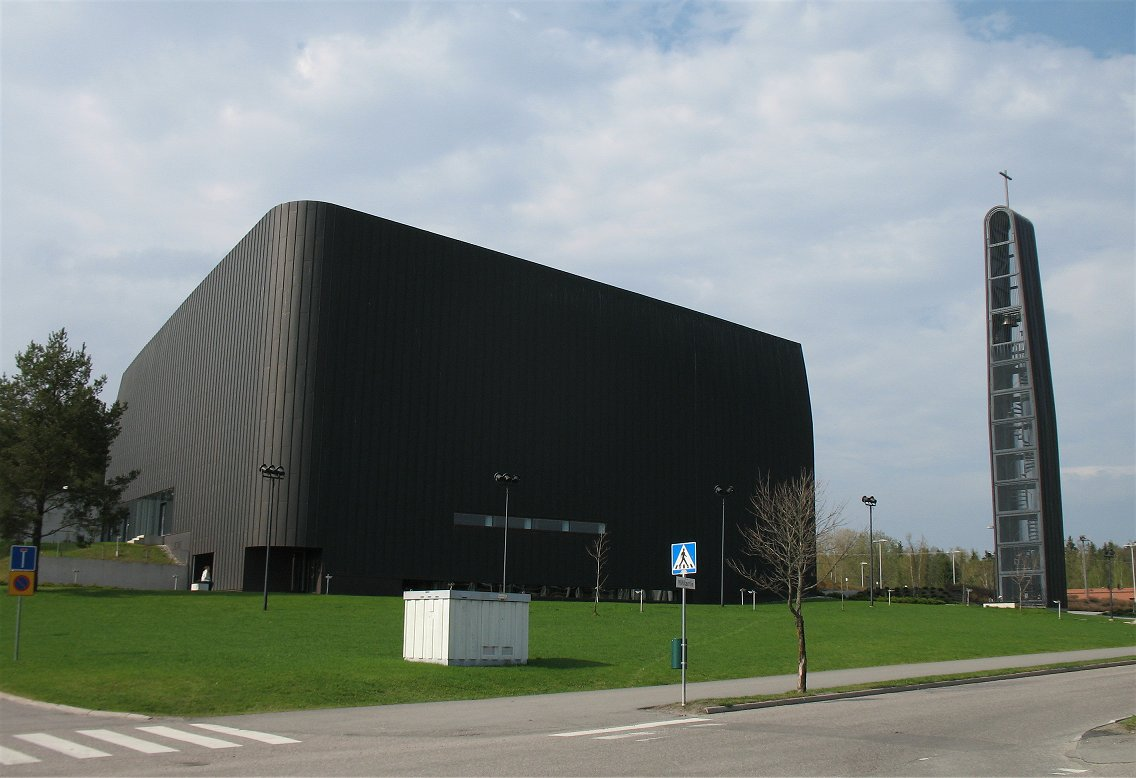
Klaukkala church in May 2010

Klaukkala Church (Finnish: Klaukkalan kirkko, Swedish: Klövskogs kyrka) is a copper-plated modern church in Klaukkala of the Nurmijärvi municipality, built in 2004. The church was designed by Anssi Lassila; interior furniture and lamps were designed by interior architect Antti Paatero and liturgical textiles by Hanna Korvela. Mikko Heikka, a bishop of the Evangelic Lutheran Church, dedicated it on November 28, 2004. Construction claimed one death when a worker fell from the roof.

Klaukkala Church was awarded the "Concrete of the Year" honorable mention in 2004.

== See also ==
- Klaukkala Orthodox Church
- Nurmijärvi church
