= Mäntysalo =

- Neighbourhood
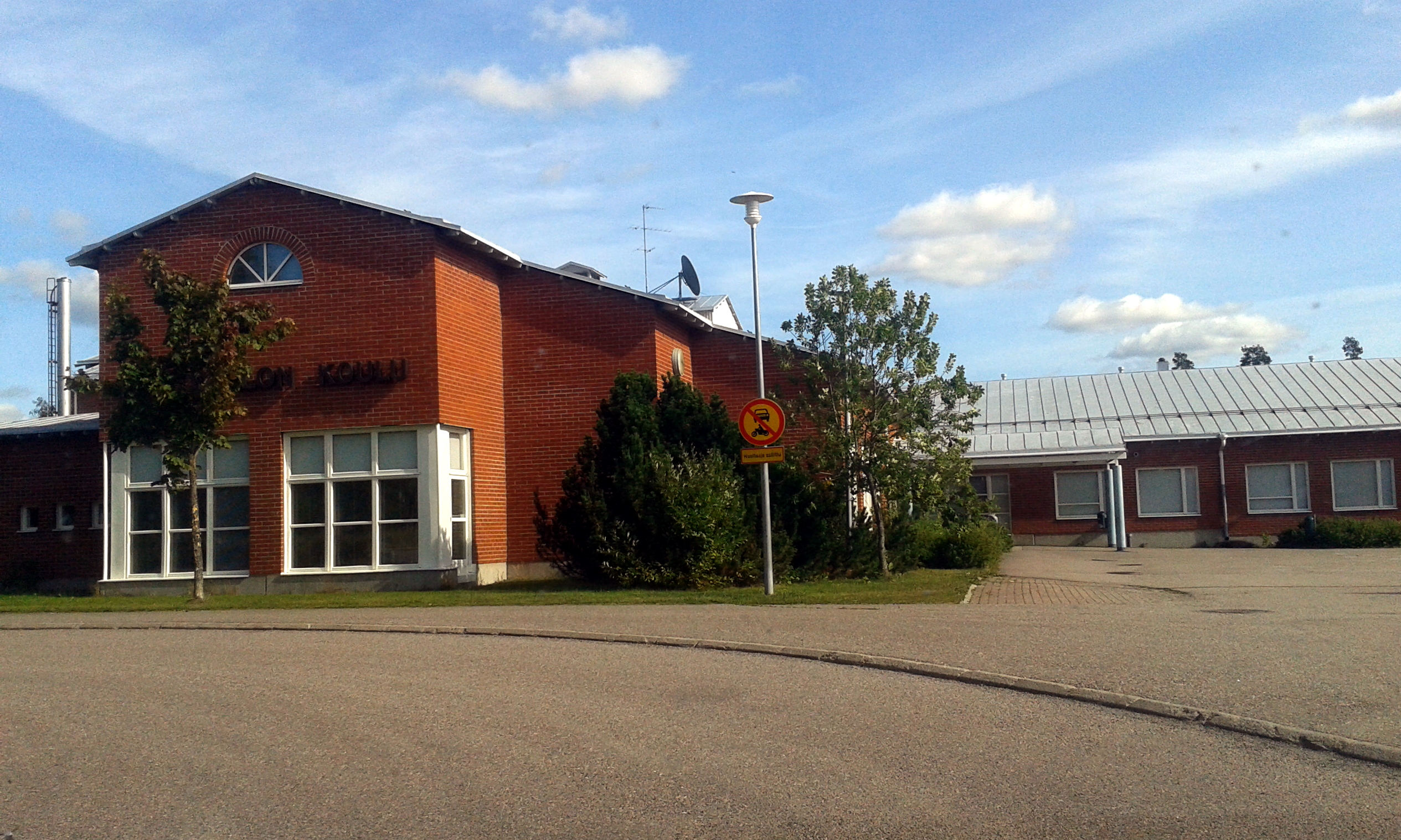
- Mäntysalo school.

- Location in Finland
- Coordinates: 60°23.90′N 24°45.40′E
- Country: Finland
- Region: Uusimaa
- Sub-Region: Helsinki sub-region
- Municipality: Nurmijärvi
- Village: Klaukkala
- Postal code: 01820

Mäntysalo (Finnish pronunciation: [ˈmæntyˌsɑlo], literally translated "pine woodland") is a residential area of about one thousand inhabitants in the northern part of Klaukkala in Nurmijärvi municipality. It is one of the largest growth areas in Klaukkala.

Haikala and Ripatti, the other residential areas of Klaukkala, are located around Mäntysalo. The most important road connection to the center of Klaukkala is Kirkkotie, which divides the areas of Haikala and Mäntysalo. The future Klaukkala bypass, Klaukkalan kehätie, which is under construction, will pass north of Mäntysalo.

== History ==
Henrik Viktor Engvist (1912-1987), the son of a merchant from Jakobstad, was responsible for the birth of the Mäntysalo area. Engvist and his family moved from Helsinki to the northern part of Klaukkala, known as the then small village, and in 1960 purchased the Karppo estate, where they built a modest, 18-square-meter log cabin. In order to secure his livelihood, Engvist came up with the idea of sketching out other potentials for residents in the area.

He went to offer a draft plan for the municipal administration, but because the answer was negative, relentless Engvist went on to present a draft to the Uusimaa Provincial Government. The province architect was fascinated by the draft and, while hoping that Engvist would refine the draft a little, he also asked him to develop names for the area and the streets to come. The place was named Mäntysalo, despite the fact that the forest consisted of spruce trees (Finnish: kuuset) rather than pine trees, but Engvist's wife Lempi considered the name "Kuusisalo" less beautiful.

== Society and services ==
Established in 1996, Mäntysalo has an elementary school with grades 4-9 (formerly grades 3-9). There are two kindergartens/preschools, Mäntysalon päiväkoti and Havumäen päiväkoti. The residents' association Mäntysalon Seura operates in Mäntysalo.

There is also an Alepa grocery store, which is officially Haikala area's Alepa, but it is also close to the Mäntysalo's area.
