= Viiri (shopping centre) =

Viiri shopping centre
- Kauppakeskus Viiri
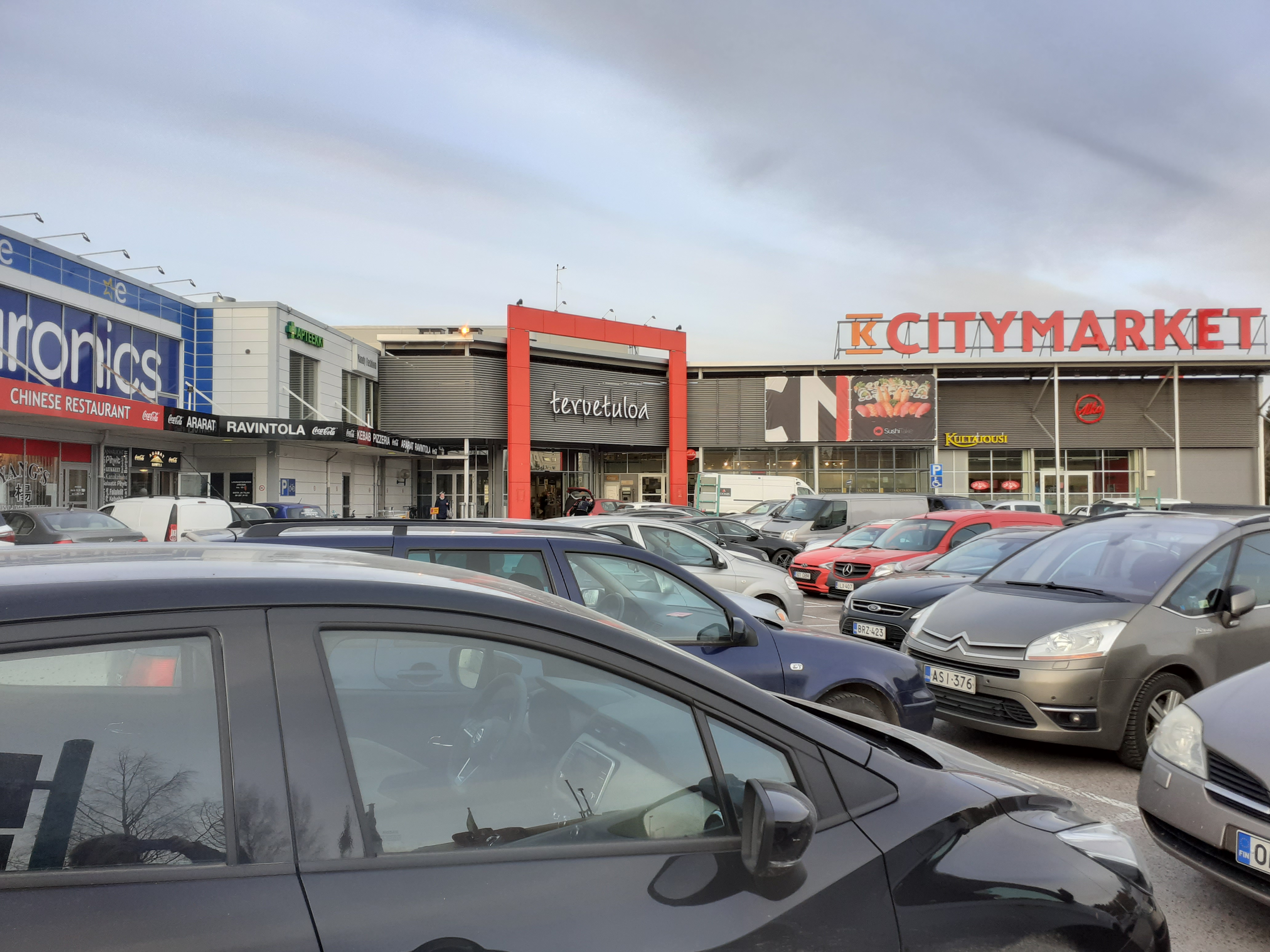
- Location: Klaukkala, Nurmijärvi Finland
- Coordinates: 60°22′41.2″N 024°45′31.0″E
- Address: Klaukkalantie 55
- Num. of stores: 18
- Floors: 3 (including parking floor)
- Website: www.kauppakeskusviiri.fi

Kauppakeskus Viiri is a shopping mall in the southeast part of Klaukkala, Finland. It is the largest shopping centre in the Nurmijärvi municipality.

The mall is divided into Big Viiri (Isoviiri) and Little Viiri (Pikkuviiri). In the spring, the Viiri Fair (Viirin Messut) is held annually in the shopping center. The fair has companies from the shopping center, as well as other stakeholders and sports clubs.

An extension, including a Prisma hypermarket, and a new market were planned for the mall. These were to be realized with the construction of the Viirinlaakso area, but HOK-Elanto withdrew from the project and moved Klaukkala's old S-market to a nearby retail space.

== Stores ==
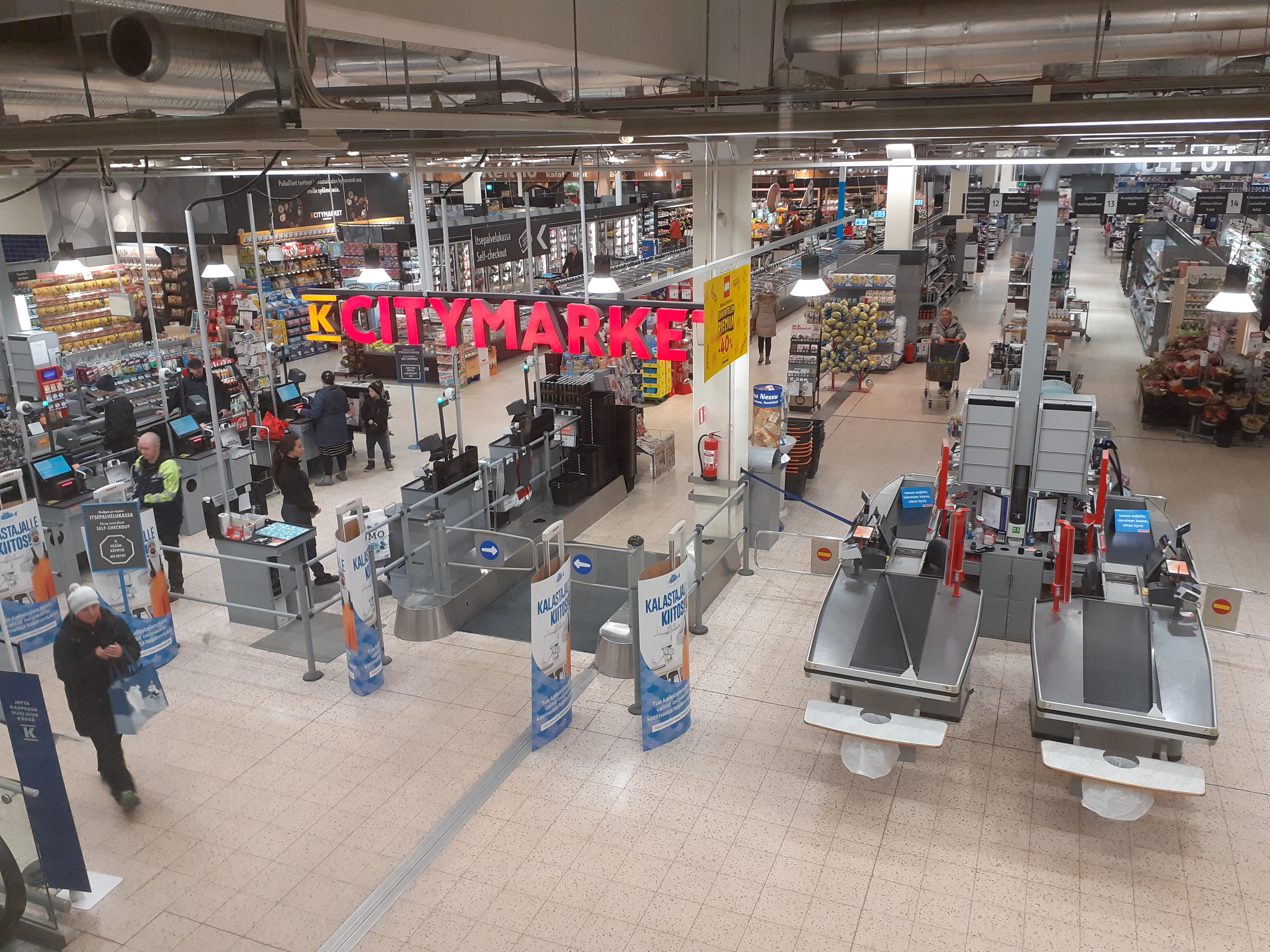
K-Citymarket hypermarket in the shopping centre.

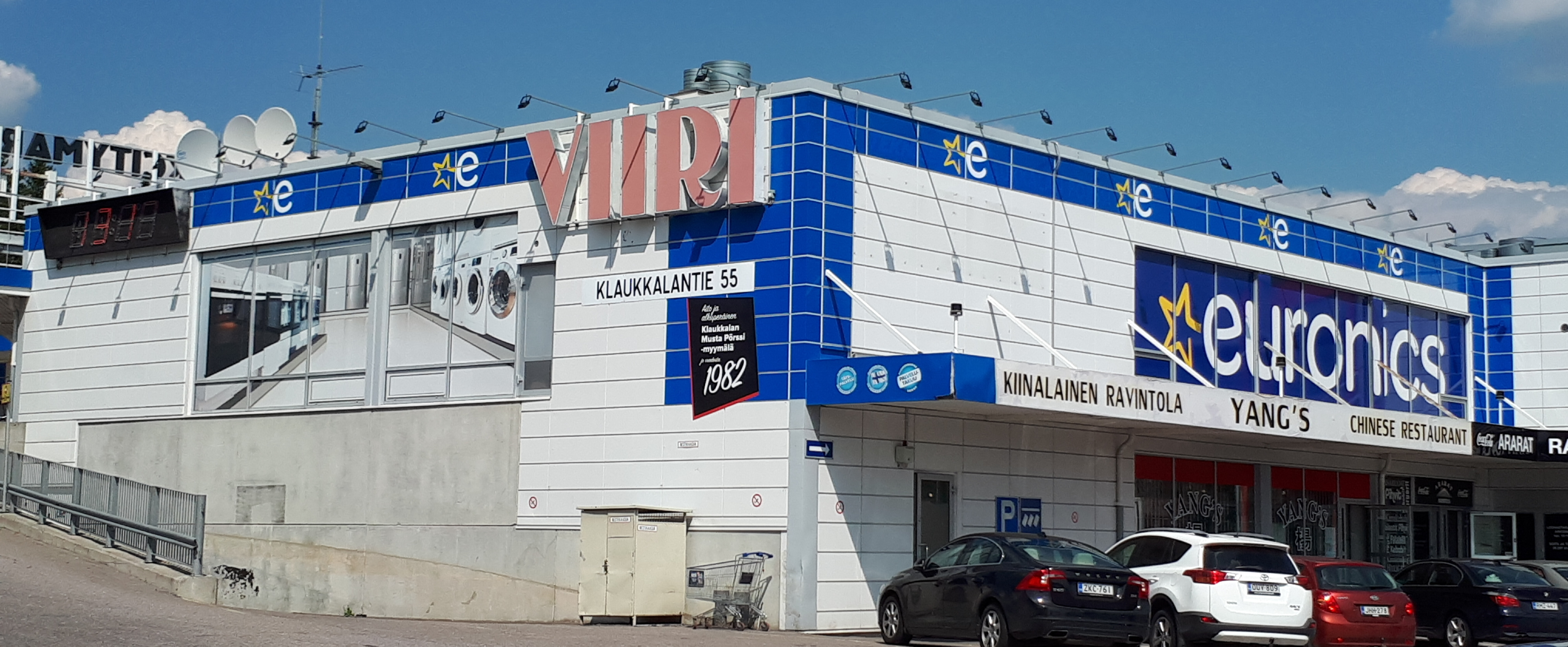
Euronics store in the shopping centre.

=== Big Viiri ===
- K-Citymarket
- Alko
- Euronics/Klaukkalan Pörssi
- Kultajousi
- Klaukkalan Apteekki
- Mandy Fashion
- Huoltopulssi
- Hieronta Lehto
- Kiinteistömaailma
- Keto-Orvokki
- Nahkari
- Valokuvaamo Vanhatalo
- Viirinhius
- Pussukka
- Fit24 Express

==== Restaurants and cafés ====
- Cafe Viiri, a coffeehouse
- Ararat, pizzeria and restaurant
- Yang's, restaurant

=== Little Viiri ===
- Team Sportia, a sports equipment store
- Klaukkalan ja Uudenmaan ajo-opisto, a driving school
