= Harjula =

- Neighbourhood
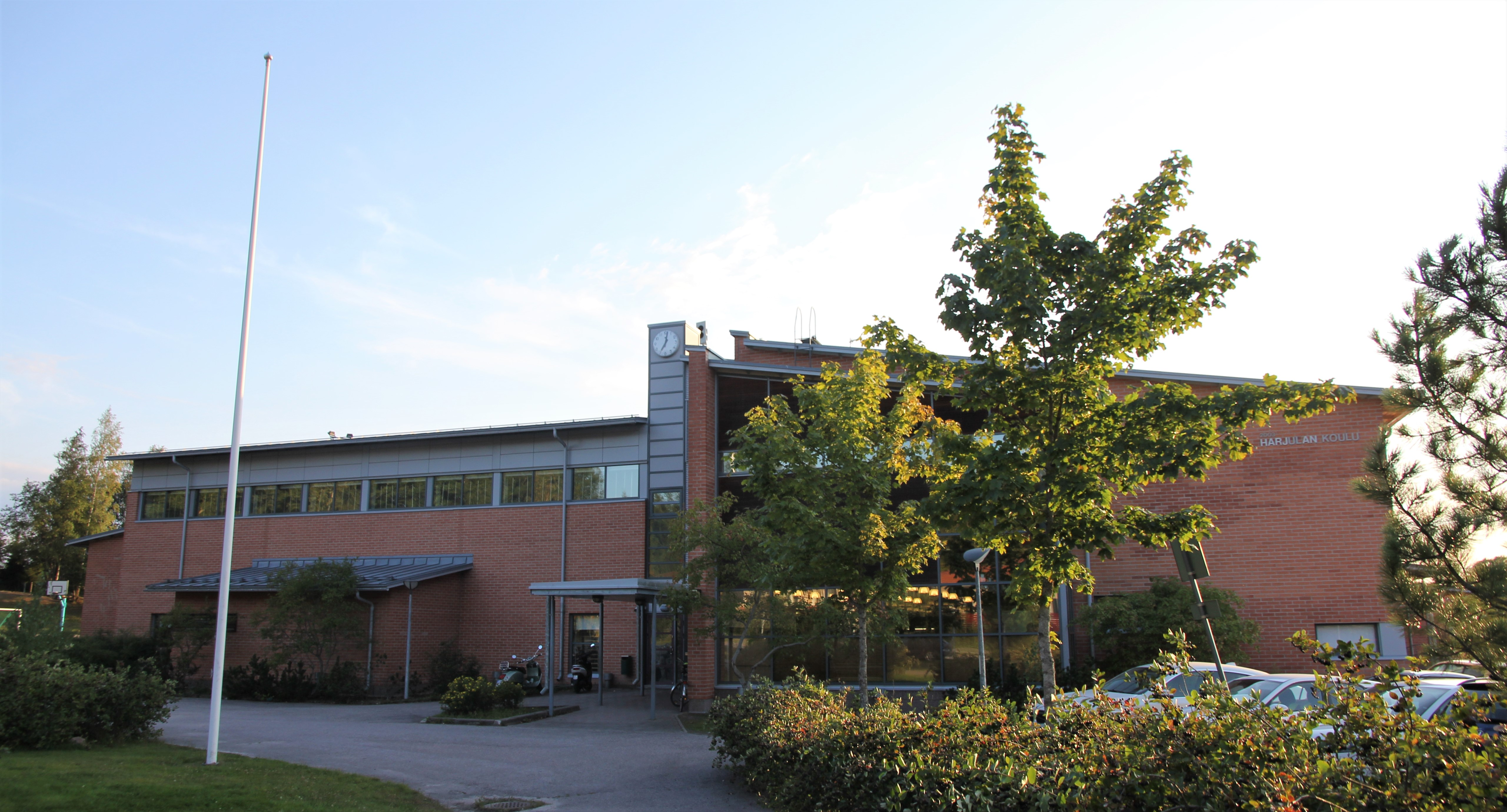
- Harjula school.

- Location in Finland
- Coordinates: 60°21.87′N 24°44.40′E
- Country: Finland
- Region: Uusimaa
- Sub-Region: Helsinki sub-region
- Municipality: Nurmijärvi
- Village: Klaukkala
- Postal code: 01840

Harjula is a residential area of about 2,000 inhabitants in the southern part of Klaukkala in Nurmijärvi municipality, by the River Lepsämä and the road leading to Lahnus. There are spacious detached houses, terraced houses, small blocks of flats and some private services in the area. Harjula has an elementary school for about 250 students with grades 1–6, and kindergarten alongside of school. In the immediate vicinity of Harjula, in the direction of Klaukkala central, is the residential area called Syrjälä. Founded in 1976, the residents' association Harjula-Seura operates in Harjula.

In the southern part of the Harjula area, near the Espoo border, an area of 44-acre is being planned by Circulation Oy for a bioterminal and utility material handling and transfer station. The construction project has sparked resistance among local residents, who have expressed concern about the effects of increasing heavy traffic, dust and potential harm to nature and the burden on the River Lepsämä. At the same time, residents are also concerned about the decline in property values.
