= Numlahti Manor =

Manor in Nurmijärvi, Finland

Coordinates: 60°25.75′N 24°43.3′E

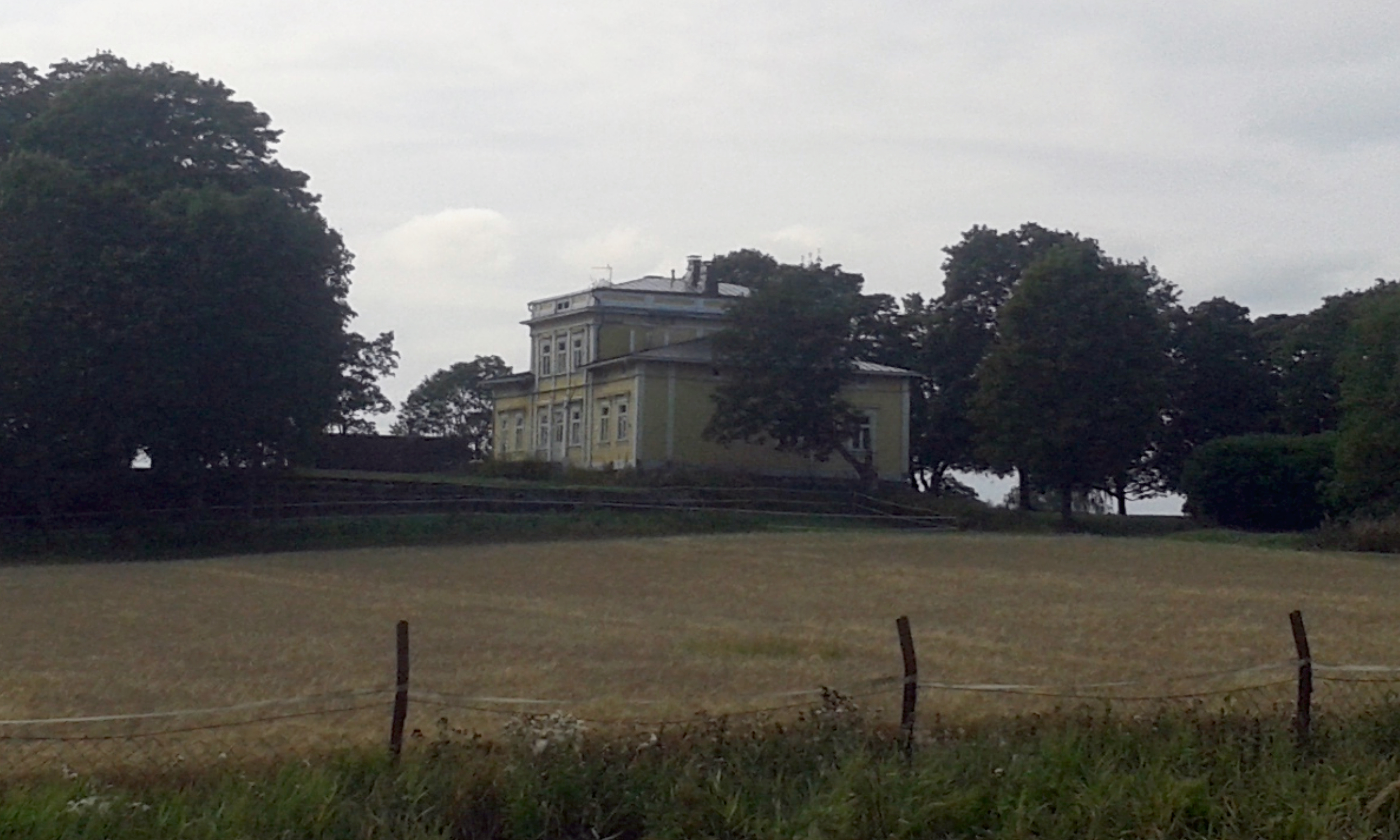
The current main house from 1876 in the Numlahti Manor.

Numlahti Manor (Finnish: Numlahden kartano, Swedish: Numlax gård) is a manor house and mansion located in Nurmijärvi, close to the villages of Valkjärvi and Numlahti along the Lopentie road. The Numlahti Manor is the oldest manor of Nurmijärvi.

== History ==
The manor dates back to 1594, when the rittmeister Klaus Hästesko acquired five houses in the village of Paijala (now Numlahti) and soon acquired the remaining four of the village houses. The former owners of the houses became ranch growers of the manor. The manor was managed by Hästesko's wife Bengta Creutz and her daughter Anna Skoo inherited the manor after her father died.

At the end of the 17th century the manor was owned by Elisabet Crusebjörn (1638–1709). He had leased it to Esaias Austrell, who was ruthlessly and roughly treating the manor workers. Then on March 2, 1697, the tenant farmer Juho Markunpoika, and his nephew, Juho Abrahaminpoika, killed Austell and his wife Kristina Dahl with an ax. After the murders, the victims were buried under the floor of the manor's vestibule and traces of the act were cleaned. Tenants broke into the manor rooms and collected from the chests a large loot, which included 200 thalers of money, silver goblets and spoons, rings, and a variety of clothing and food. The murderers first fled from Nurmijärvi to Vyborg and thence to Tallinn, where they were arrested in April. Both were sentenced to death and loss of property in June 1697.

From 1922 to 1930, the manor was owned by Hjalmar V. Pohjanheimo, a film producer and businessman. Every summer, his old silent films by Lyyra Film were shown to a crowd of servants and villagers. However, the film reels were eventually destroyed.

Carl Jonas Borup became the owner of the manor in 1934, and ever since, to the present day, the manor has been owned by the Borup family.

== Buildings ==
The manor's two-floor main building partly dating back to 1876. The courtyard also features a probably 18th-century long mansard-roofed wing. The outbuildings made of brick from the manor date back to the early 20th century.

The manor had a mill and a sawmill on the shore of nearby Kuhakoski. Later, the manor also had its own small power plant, a brick factory and a dairy.

== Sources ==
- Ojanne, Jaakko (2016). Kuhajärven rantamilla. Klingendahl Paino Oy. ISBN 978-952-5435-35-1.
