= Rapids =

River section with increased velocity and turbulence

Rapids of Kern River, California, USA.

Rapids are sections of a river where the river bed has a relatively steep gradient, causing an increase in water velocity and turbulence. Flow, gradient, constriction, and obstacles are four factors that are needed for a rapid to be created.

== Physical factors ==
Rapids are hydrological features between a run (a smoothly flowing part of a stream) and a cascade. Rapids are characterized by the river becoming shallower with some rocks exposed above the flow surface. As flowing water splashes over and around the rocks, air bubbles become mixed in with it and portions of the surface acquire a white color, forming what is called "whitewater". Rapids occur where the bed material is highly resistant to the erosive power of the stream in comparison with the bed downstream of the rapids. Very young streams flowing across solid rock may be rapids for much of their length. Rapids cause water aeration of the stream or river, resulting in better water quality.

For a rapid to form, a necessary condition is the presence of a gradient, which refers to the river or stream's downward slope. When a river has a larger gradient, the water flows downhill faster. Gradients are typically measured in feet per mile or metres per kilometre. This impacts the river's flow or discharge, which is measured as a volume of water per unit of time. The faster the water flows, the more likely a rapid will form.

Rapids typically form due to differential erosion in the sloping strata forming the streambed in the presence of a gradient, the softer rocks erode away faster whereas the harder rocks persist resulting in an uneven streambed.

The safety of a section of river is measured by classes or levels, generally running from I to VI on the basis of how navigable the rapids are. A Class 5 rapid may be categorized as Class 5.1-5.9. While Class I rapids are easy to navigate and require little maneuvering, Class VI rapids pose threat to life with little or no chance for rescue, often classified as 'U' for Unraftable. River rafting sports are carried out where many rapids are present in the course.

Constriction refers to when rivers flow through narrower channels, thus increasing the velocity of the water. This may also lead to the creation of obstructions due to sediment transportation and erosion. Obstacles may occur by human activity, natural landslides and earthquakes, or accumulation of sediment or debris. The more prominent these four factors are present in a river, the more likely that river is to be a rapid river.

== Gallery ==
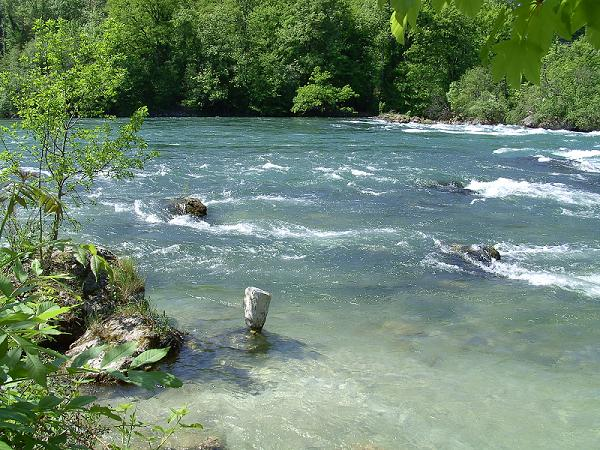
Rapids featuring whitewater, close to the Rhine Falls

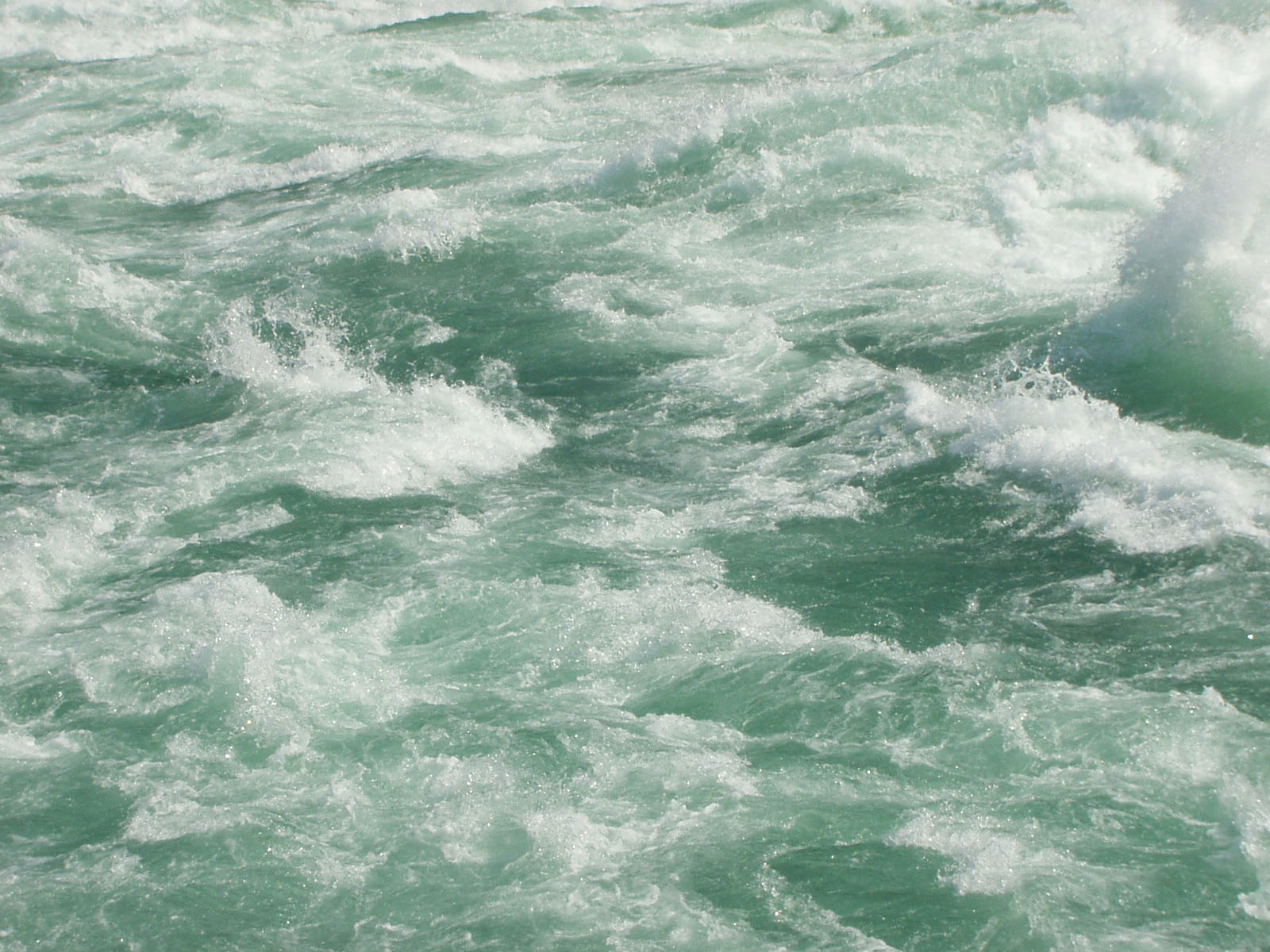
Violent water below Niagara Falls

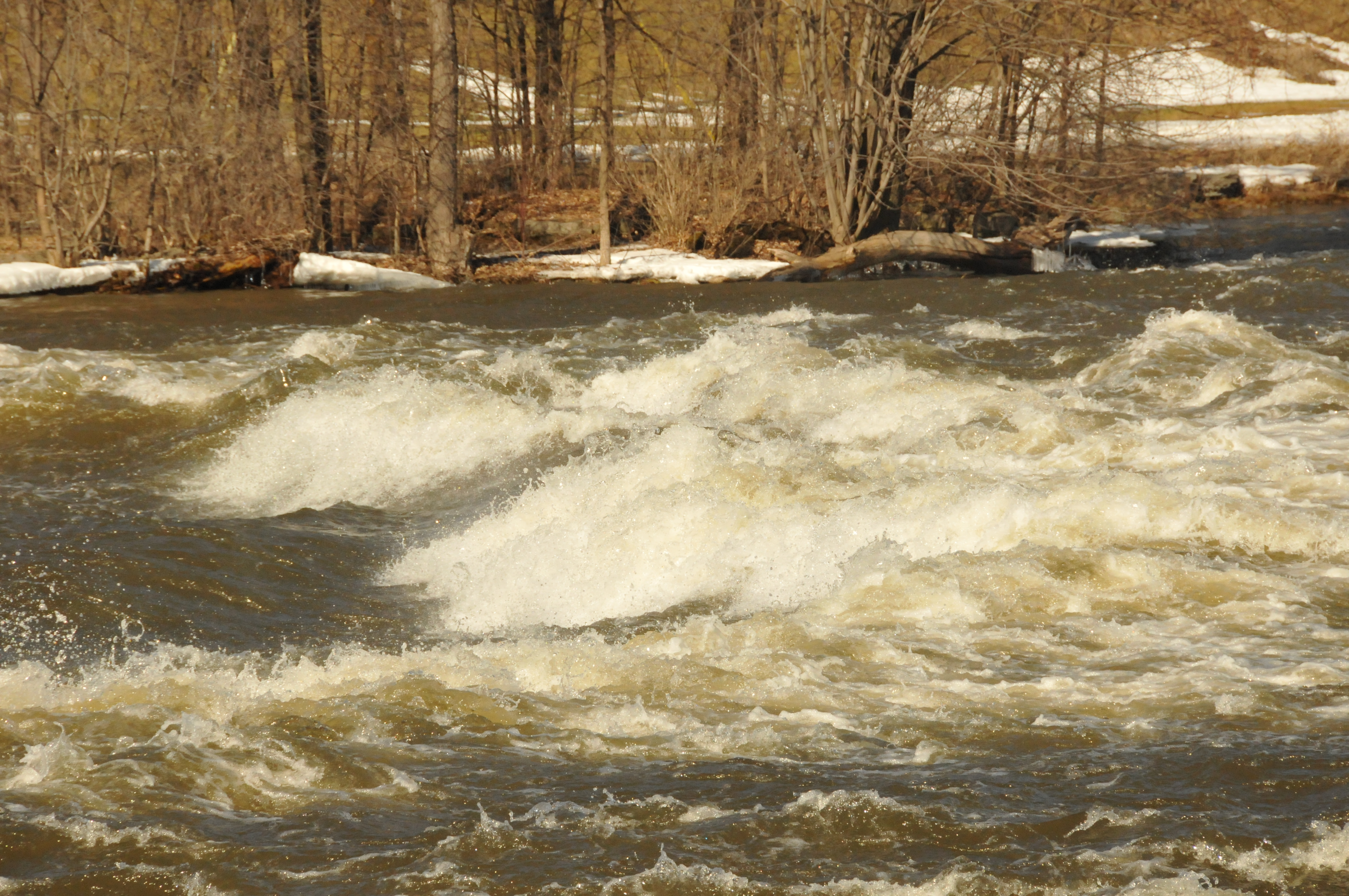
Rapids on the Mississippi River (Ontario) in Pakenham, Ontario, Canada.

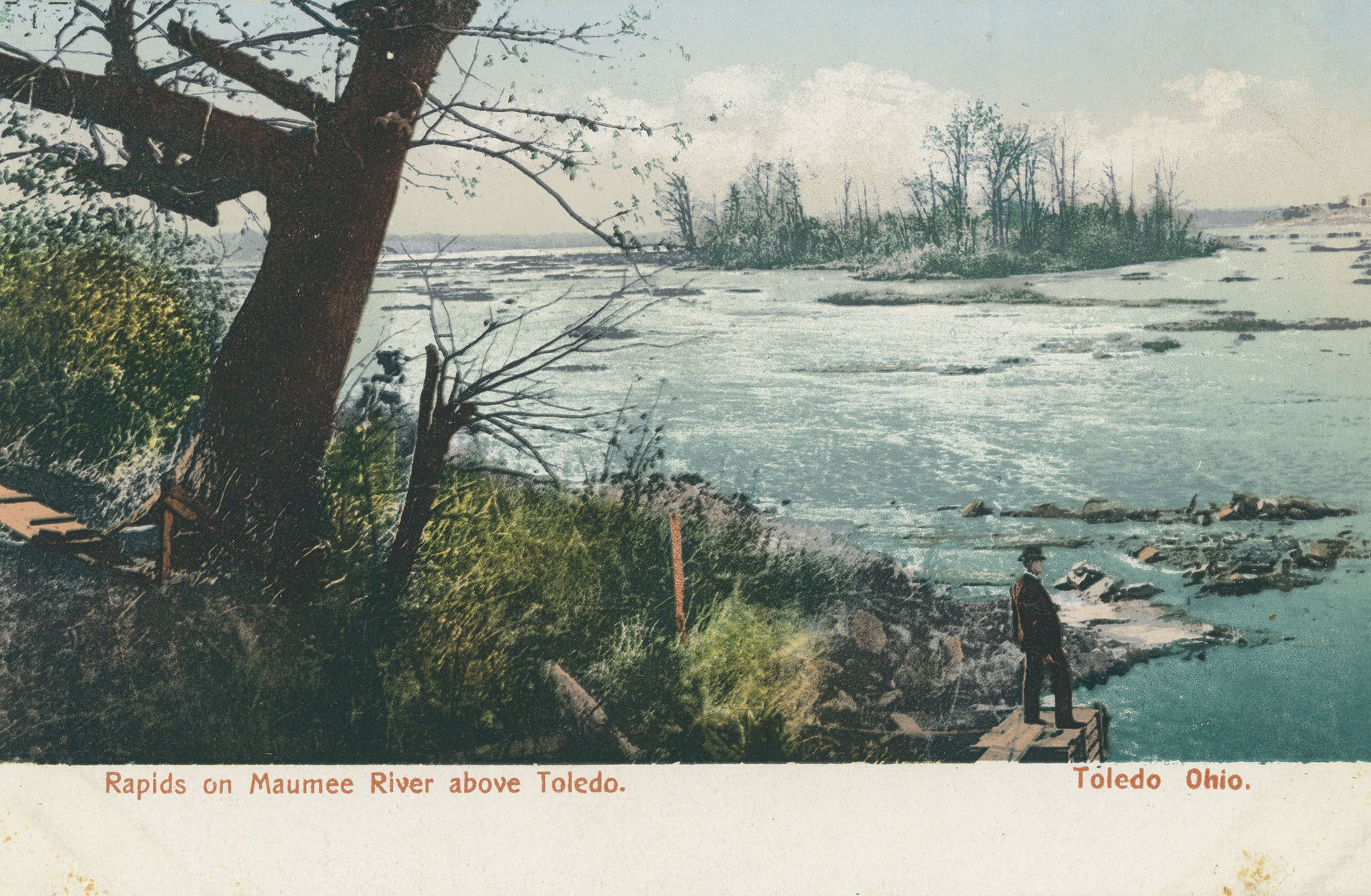
Historical image of the river rapids on the Maumee River in Ohio

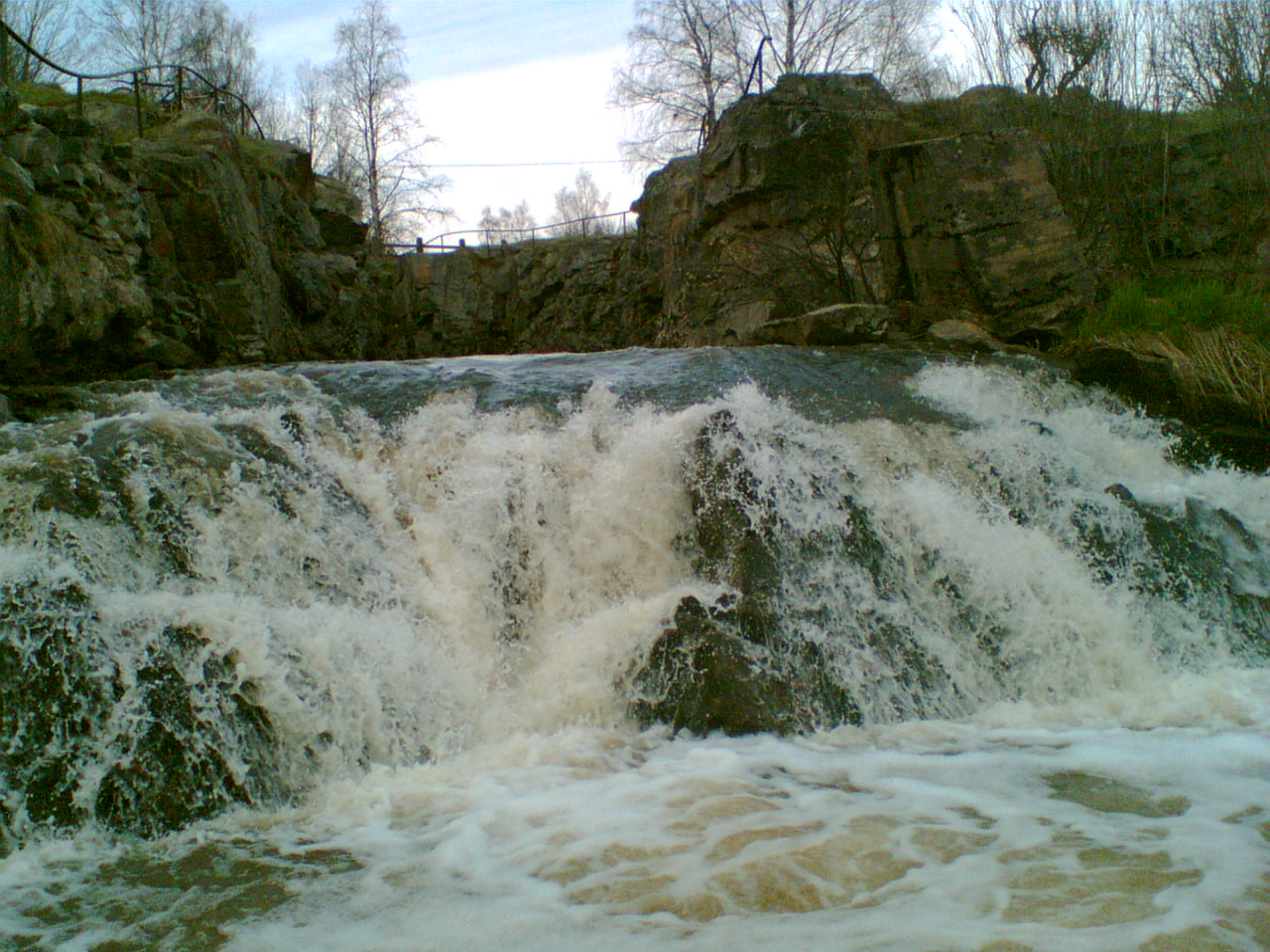
The Kuhakoski rapids in Uusimaa, Finland

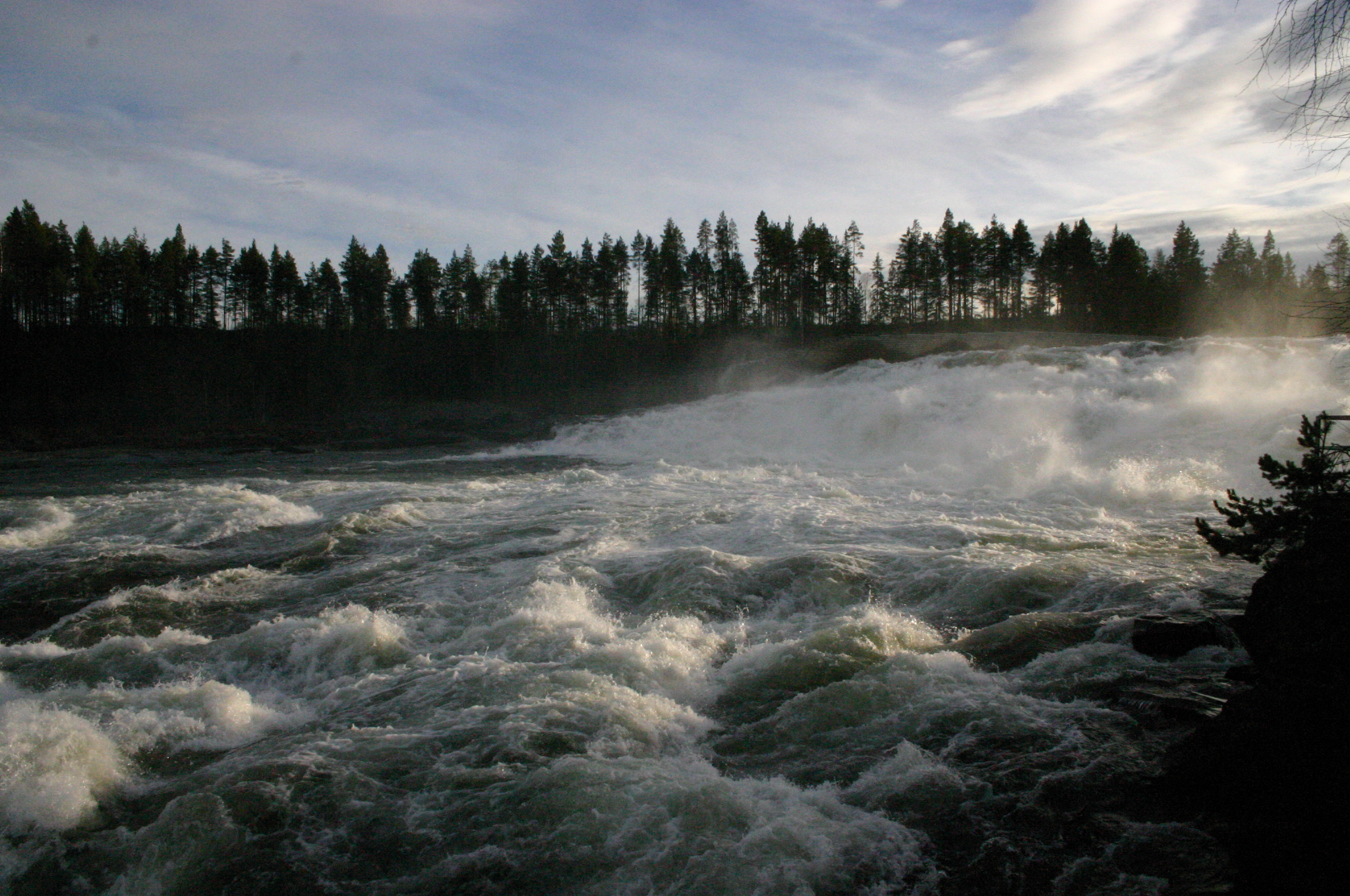
Storforsen, rapids along the Ume River, Norrbotten, Sweden

== See also ==
- Fluid dynamics
- International scale of river difficulty – for classification of rapids
- Rheophile – organisms that live in fast-flowing water
- Riffle – A fast-moving portion of a stream without the vigor of a rapid
- River rapids ride
