= Karl Emil Malmelin =

Finnish murderer (1872–1944)

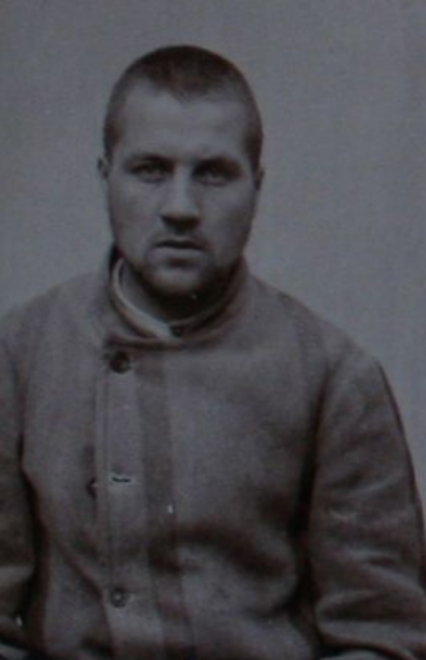
- Born: 16 January 1872; Lahnus, Espoo, Grand Duchy of Finland
- Died: 26 February 1944 (aged 72); Riipilä, Vantaa, Finland
- Occupation: Farmworker
- Penalty: Life imprisonment

Details
- Date: 10 May 1899
- Locations: Klaukkala, Nurmijärvi, Finland
- Killed: 7
- Weapon: Axe

Karl Emil Malmelin (16 January 1872 – 26 February 1944) was a Finnish farmworker and mass murderer.

Malmelin was born 1872 in Espoo as the illegitimate child of Helena Gustava Malmelin, a maid at a Lahnus croft. As an adult, Malmelin became a farmworker at the Simola croft in Klaukkala, a village in the southern part of the Nurmijärvi municipality. The tenant there was Johan Ezekiel Aspelin. Malmelin began dating Edla, the crofter's daughter, but when she would not become his wife, he killed everyone on the croft with an axe on 10 May 1899. Three of the victims were women and two were children. Malmelin was arrested a couple of weeks later.

Malmelin was sentenced to life imprisonment by the Turku Court of Appeal. The case was the subject of a broadside ballad, and Nurmijärvi parish became popularly known as Murhajärvi (which literally means "murder lake"). Malmelin served 13 years of his sentence before being pardoned by Nicholas II in 1912. The later events of Malmelin's life remain unknown. He died to a long-term illness in 1944, aged 72, in Riipilä, Vantaa.

Malmelin remains one of the worst axe murderers in Finnish history, along with Toivo Koljonen.

== Sources ==
- Keskisarja, Teemu (2015). Kirves: Toivo Harald Koljosen rikos ja rangaistus. Siltala. ISBN 978-952-234-324-6.

== See also ==
- List of massacres in Finland
- Axe murder
