= Lepsämä =

Village in Nurmijärvi

Coordinates: 60°23′N 24°38′E

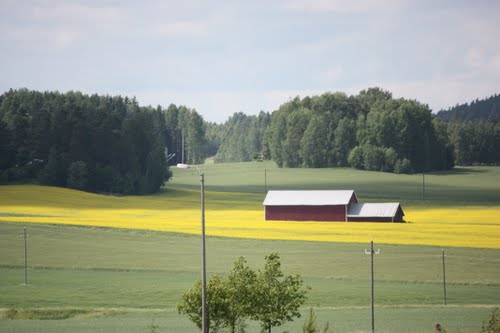
A rural landscape in Lepsämä

Lepsämä is a village in the municipality of Nurmijärvi, Finland. There is a comprehensive school in Lepsämä, which was partially destroyed by arson fire in October 2019. With the exception of the village kiosk, there are no grocery stores or other daily services in Lepsämä, but the nearest ones are available less than five kilometers from Klaukkala, the largest village in the Nurmijärvi municipality; in the past, however, the village had a shop, a bank and a post office. The residential area called Lintumetsä, which is always growing next to village, is actually part of Klaukkala, although it is misleadingly located near Lepsämä.

The former prime minister of Finland Matti Vanhanen and a Eurodance musician Waldo lives in Lepsämä. Also the conductor Santtu-Matias Rouvali. Lepsämä has grown in population in recent few years and in 2005 it was the most rapidly growing village in Finland (in relation to population size).

In the 1820s, the regions of Uusimaa and southern Häme were tormented by infamous bandits, so called the "Nurmijärvi robbers", who robbed houses and travellers, tortured their residents and even killed people. The leaders of the robbers came from Lepsämä. Also Aleksis Kivi's great-uncle Matti Stenvall was a member of the gang.

== See also ==
- Lepsämä site, finnish
