= Numlahti =

Village in Nurmijärvi, Finland

Coordinates: 60°26.30′N 24°44.215′E

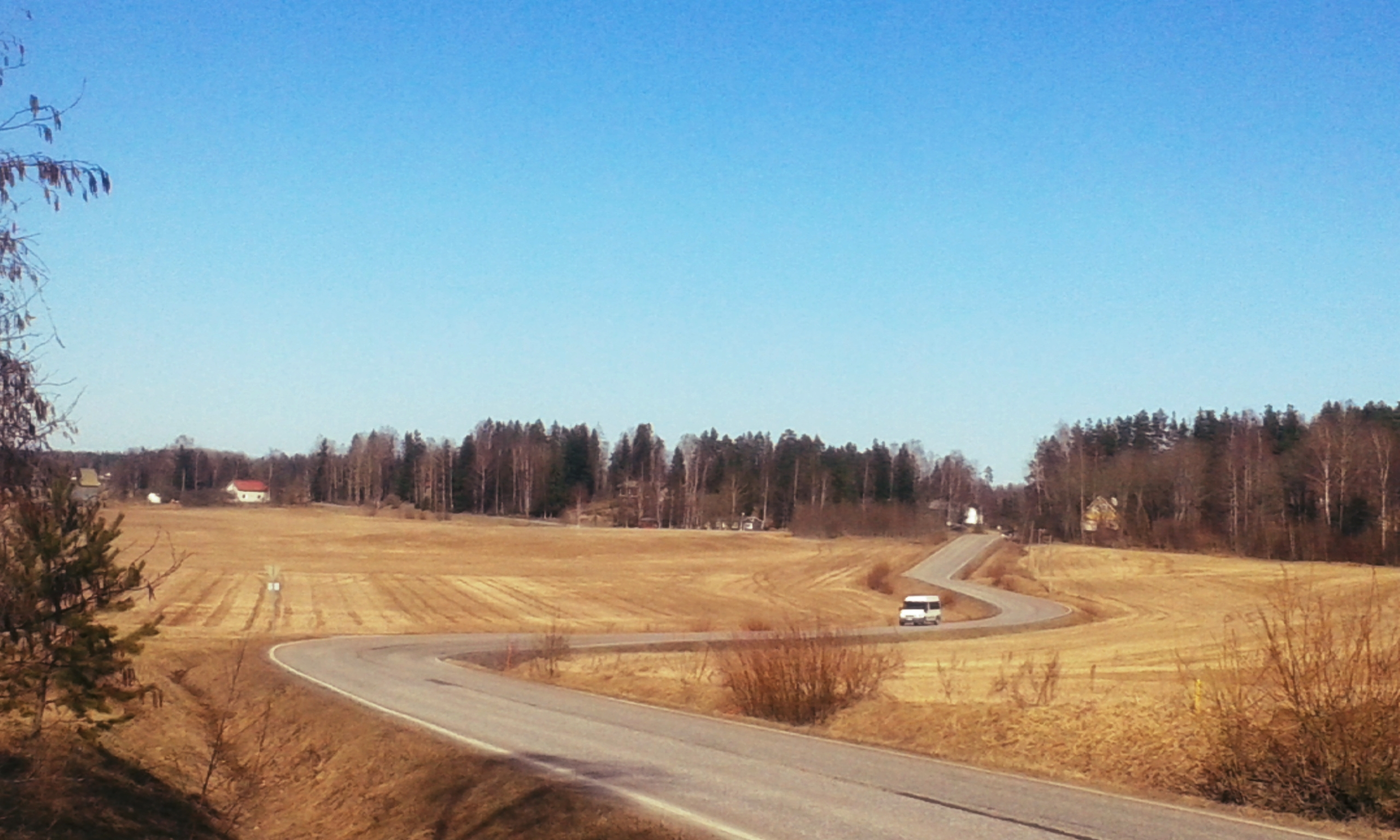
A rural landscape in Numlahti.

Numlahti (Swedish: Numlax) is a rural village in the municipality of Nurmijärvi, close to the village of Perttula and five kilometers from Klaukkala. The Numlahti Manor, which dates back to 1594 and is the oldest manor of the municipality, is located in Numlahti along the Lopentie road. The lands of the manor were separated after the World War II for immigrants who came from Karelia to be redeemed, thus forming a so-called "karelian village". Between Perttula, Uotila and Numlahti was once lake called Kuhajärvi, which was dried in a field partly in the 1830s and 1850s, and then completely in the 1920s and 1940s. Numlahti has no school of its own, but the pupils go to other schools in the municipality.

== Sources ==
- Ojanne, Jaakko (2016). Kuhajärven rantamilla. Klingendahl Paino Oy. ISBN 978-952-5435-35-1.
