= Klaukkala =

Klaukkala Klövskog
- Urban area
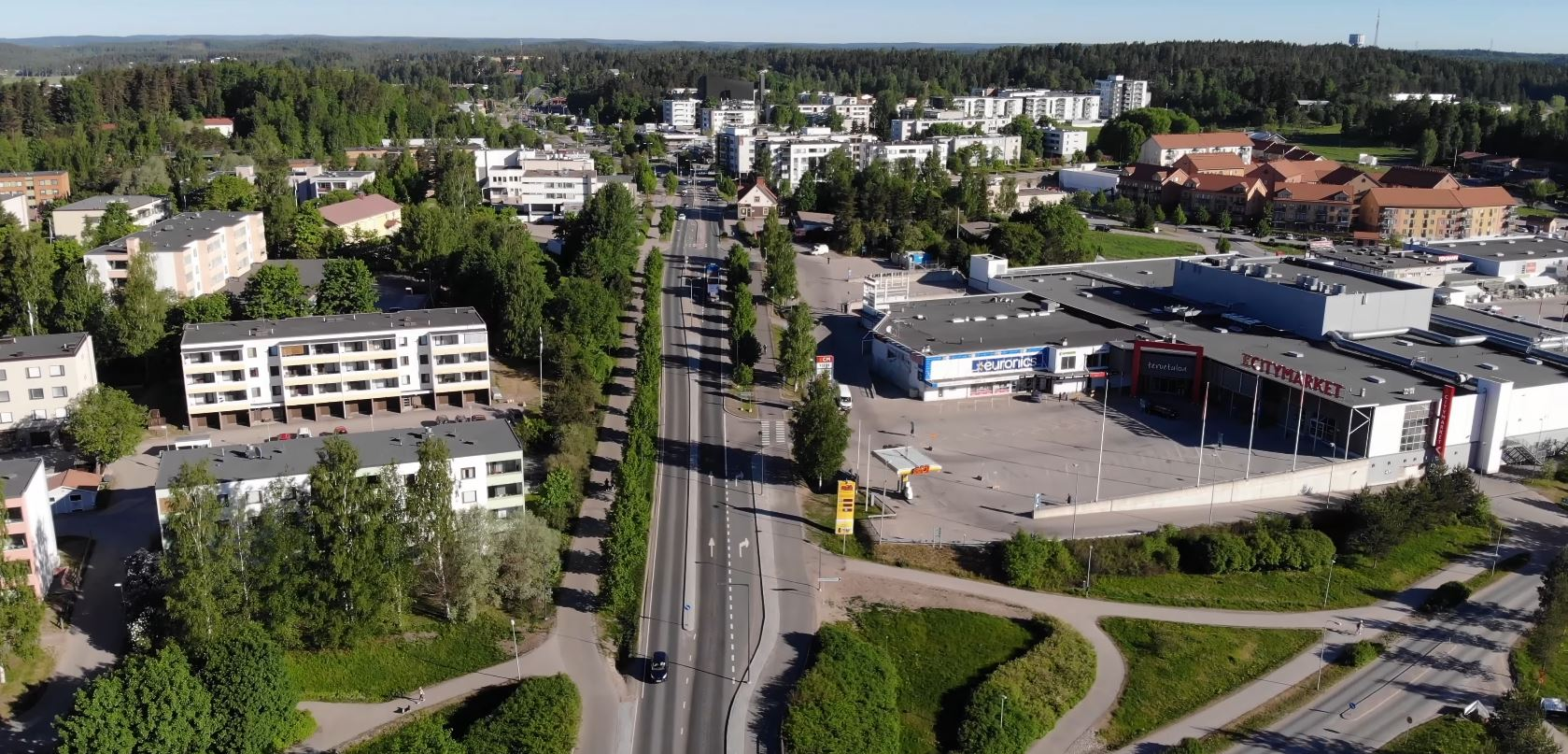
- Aerial view of Klaukkala in 2019.

- Location in Finland Klaukkala (Uusimaa)
- Coordinates: 60°22.92′N 24°44.95′E
- Country: Finland
- Region: Uusimaa
- Municipality: Nurmijärvi

Area
  - Total: 44.03 km^{2} (17.00 sq mi)

Population (2020-12-31)
  - Total: 21,019
  - Density: 477/km^{2} (1,240/sq mi)
- Time zone: UTC+2 (EET)
  - Summer (DST): UTC+3 (EEST)
- Postal codes: 01800, 01820, 01840

Klaukkala (Finnish: [ˈklɑu̯kːɑlɑ]; Swedish: Klövskog, Finland Swedish: [ˈkløːvskuːɡ]) is the southern-most urban area (Finnish: taajama) of the Nurmijärvi municipality in Uusimaa, Finland, located near Lake Valkjärvi. It is the largest urban area in Nurmijärvi. In the 2010s, Klaukkala's urban area grew to be part of the larger Helsinki urban area.

Klaukkala has a population of over 20,000 and is the fastest-growing area of Nurmijärvi; almost half of the total population of the municipality lives in Klaukkala. Its population began to rise in the 1960s, when it surpassed the church village of Nurmijärvi. In the 1970s, Klaukkala also grew larger than Rajamäki, which until then was the largest of Nurmijärvi's villages. At that time, Klaukkala's population was over 2,500. Klaukkala has significant migration mainly from the Helsinki conurbation, being a rural village a half-hour's drive away from the Helsinki centre, it especially attracts families with children. Unfortunately, due to the enormous population growth, the village is also infamous for its growing traffic, which causes local problems at the mornings and afternoons.

In the early 2000s, many detached houses were built in Klaukkala, but the situation has changed as up to three-quarters of the new houses are apartment, terraced and semi-detached houses.

== Etymology ==
The name of Klaukkala in Finnish is based on the name of the house, which in turn includes the name of the early host of the house, a variant of the name of Nikolaus, as well as Klaus, Klavus and Klåvus in Swedish. The name of the house is originally Finnish and its host is called "Klaukka". The names of the village used in history include Klöckeskoogh in 1527, Klockskoby in 1540, Klöckeskoby in 1544, Klauko in 1710 and Klaukala Hemmi in 1835. The name Klaukkala was officially established in 1866. In the present-day Swedish name, Klövskog, the first part klöv means hoof and the second part skog means forest.

== History ==
=== Early history ===
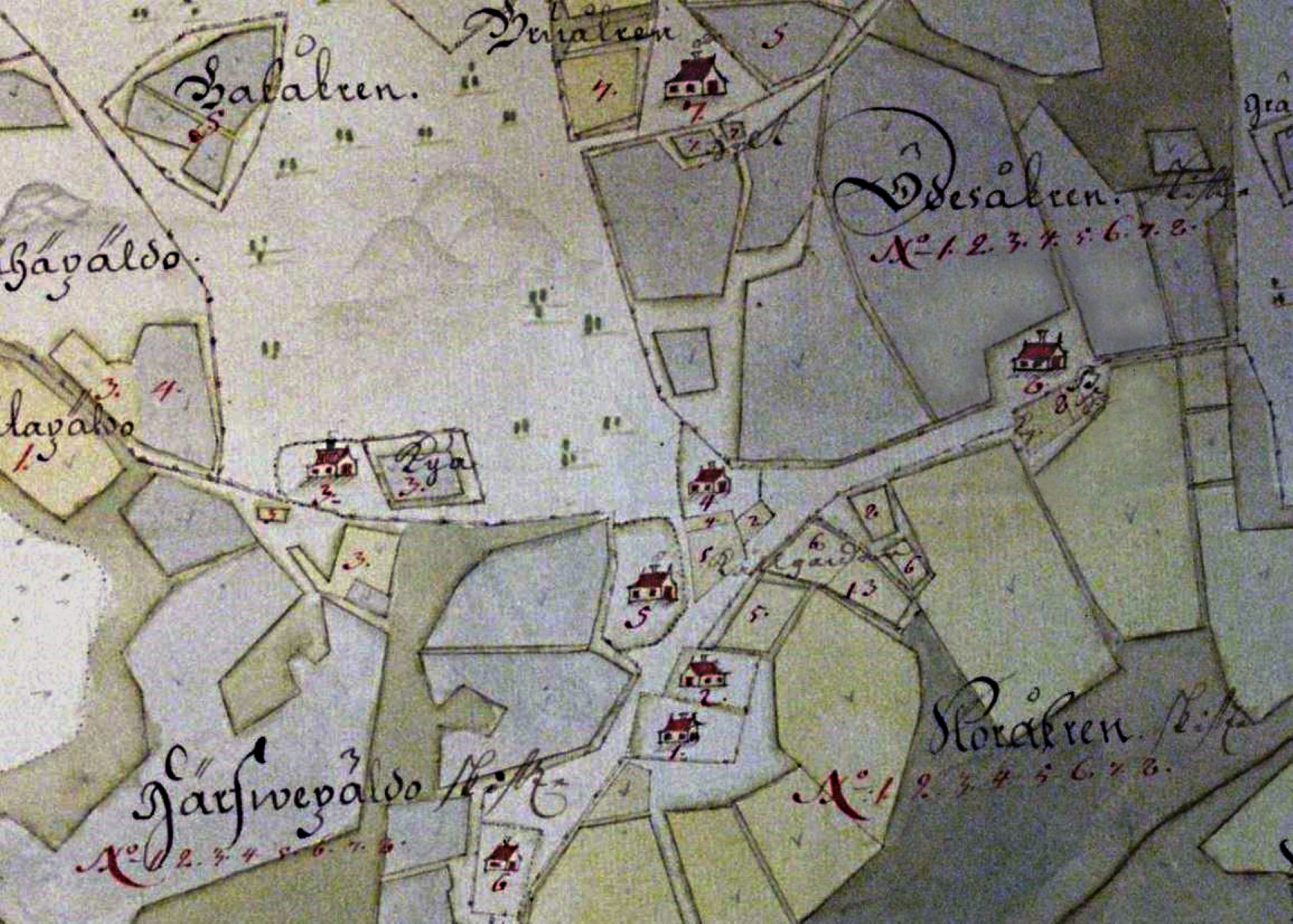
Old map of the Gunnari area in the Klaukkala village from 1724.

The earliest references to Klaukkala date back to the 16th century, at which time the village was part of the Helsinki parish (Finnish: Helsingin pitäjä). The earliest inhabitants were mainly Tavastians. In the 1540s there were as many as 11 houses in Klaukkala, which together constituted five full taxes: Viiri, Tilkka, Gunnari, Olli, Huitti, Seppälä and Klaukka, which was the oldest house in the village. In 1592, a part of Klaukka's estate was created by dividing the Mylläri house according to its host, miller Erkki Niilonpoika. Thus, in 1600 there were 10 farms in Klaukkala and one desert farm (one of the houses in Viiri). Klaukkala is mentioned in the 1500s as the prosperous village of the parish.

The population of Klaukkala remained unstable between the mid-16th century and the 18th century. In the 16th century, the population remained fairly constant through the early 17th century, but then began to decline due to superpower wars, until the Great Famine years of the 1690s reduced the population by about 20%. The population grew momentarily before the Great Northern War, which again caused the population to decline. By the mid-18th century, however, the population had grown considerably. The fluctuations in house numbers in the villages followed the boom and bust until the late 17th century, after which the number of deserts remained the same. The reason for this was that the rapid population growth was mainly due to the stateless population, while the old farm numbers remained the same and more resources were needed to maintain them. In the latter part of the 18th century, the homeless population created a need for colonization and the establishment of farmhouses.

=== Axe murders and the civil war ===
In the late 19th century, Klaukkala became infamous for the massacre that took place on May 10, 1899 in Simola's croft. At that time Karl Emil Malmelin, the croft's farmworker, killed the entire seven-member household with an axe. All in all, the incident was so terrible that it resulted in one of the most notable manhunts in Finnish history, folk tales, and at least two well-known and surviving broadside ballads. The incident affected the entire Nurmijärvi's reputation for a long time, giving the parish a nickname such as Murhajärvi (literally "murder lake"). At that time, the incident was the worst massacre in Finland since the Åbo Bloodbath in 1599, almost 300 years earlier.

During the Finnish Civil War, after the Battle of Helsinki, German troops who cooperated with the Whites in the fight against the Red Guards, conquered Klaukkala on April 19, 1918 from the Reds with the aim of getting the troops from Helsinki to Hämeenlinna. According to the Germans, the conquest of Klaukkala was a strict operation. The Red Guards defended the hill of the village in the "frustration of despair". They had good positions on the hill, but only four machine guns, possibly against the fourteen machine guns of the Whites. German sources recall that Klaukkala was captured by an assault in an hour and a half, which caught a total of 55 red prisoners.

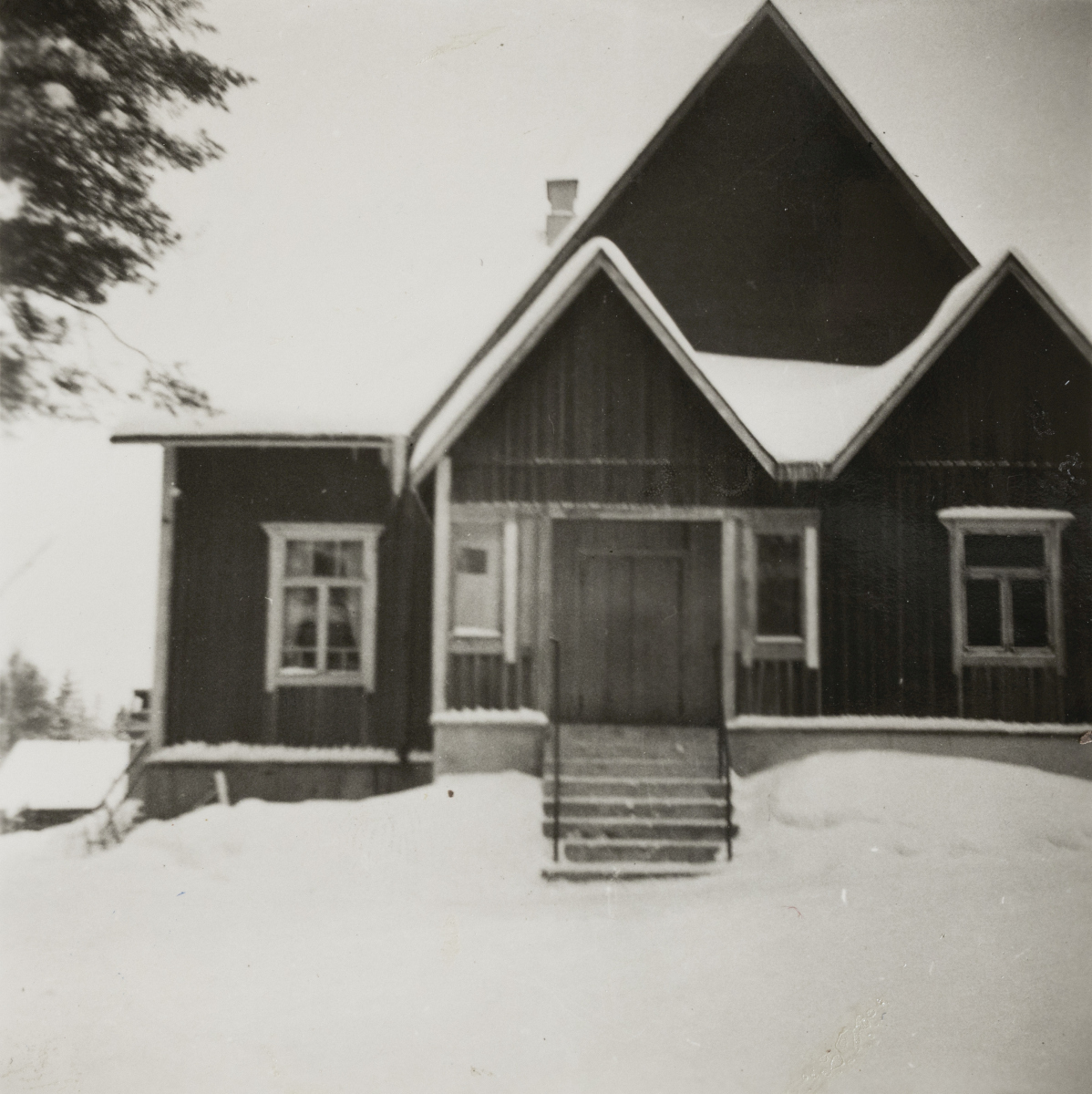
Klaukkala Workers' House in 1957.

=== Improvement of the market area ===
The most significant shopping center in Klaukkala are the Viirintori marketplace and Viirinlaakso areas. The history of Viirintori dates back to the 19th century and the handed over to Karelia through family business. Kaarlo Narinen and his wife Anna founded the Kilpeenjoki's general merchandise store in the Vyborg village in 1897. The Narinen family fled the Russian invasion during the Continuation War as far as Klaukkala and founded the economic store Klaukkalan Talouskauppa in the early 1950s.

The next generation to lead it, Kaarlo and Anna's son Sakeus Narinen, along with wife Helmi. Their son Jouko Narinen is the originator of the Klaukkala's Viirintori and Viirinlaakso commercial center. He has been a merchant and developer of initiative and diligence for five decades.

The area of Viirintori has increased significant commercial activity in Viirinlaakso and Klaukkala. The continuous development of the Klaukkalan Talouskauppa, which began in the 1960s, has now led to a situation where the municipality of Nurmijärvi plans to make Viirinlaakso a commercial center for Klaukkala. Jouko Narinen and his wife Ritva took over the Klaukkalan Talouskauppa in 1961. Since then, Jouko Narinen has been developing and growing the trade and the commercial real estate surrounding it throughout his career.

Every ten years a new one was built and later the old one was also renovated. The first phase of growth began immediately after the last generation change. In 1963, Narinen built a new commercial building, which, among other things, was rented by a post office. The commercial building was renovated again in 1970. In 1976 an iron hall was erected on the fields and in 1982 Kiinteistö Oy Viirintori was completed. At the same time, Klaukkalan Talouskauppa became Viiri-Market Ky, which also included a commercial car circling the area. Viiri-Market employed 25 people at its best, and Viirintori had ten companies leased in addition to Viiri-Market. Viirintori's rapture and publishing activities as well as Jouko Narinen's activity were more visible in the construction of Klaukkala. The Viiri Fair and Viirintorin Sanomat became known in Klaukkala's households since the 1980s.

Jouko Narinen is a founding member of Klaukkalan Yrittäjät and a long-time active member. Ritva and Jouko Narinen retired from active business in 1994. They transferred the Viiri-Market store to Kesko. The Viirintori still remained owned by Jouko Narinen and the business will continue as a rental business under the management of daughter Päivi Salo (née Narinen). The marketplace has been further expanded, Viirintori has been renovated and the parceled plot has become K-Citymarket. Currently there are more than 20 tenants in Viirintori.

== Geography ==
=== Location ===
The distance from Klaukkala to the border of Espoo is about 5 km and also the border of Vantaa is about 3 km, which is why Klaukkala is very close to the capital region of Greater Helsinki. The nearest districts are Luhtaanmäki, Vestra and Riipilä in Vantaa and Lahnus in Espoo. The distance to the Helsinki center is less than 30 km and the distance to Loppi is over 40 km. The church village of Nurmijärvi is about 15 km from Klaukkala.

Helsinki-Vantaa Airport is about 20 minutes' drive from Klaukkala; the fastest route is along National road 3 (E12) and Ring III highways.

=== Areas ===
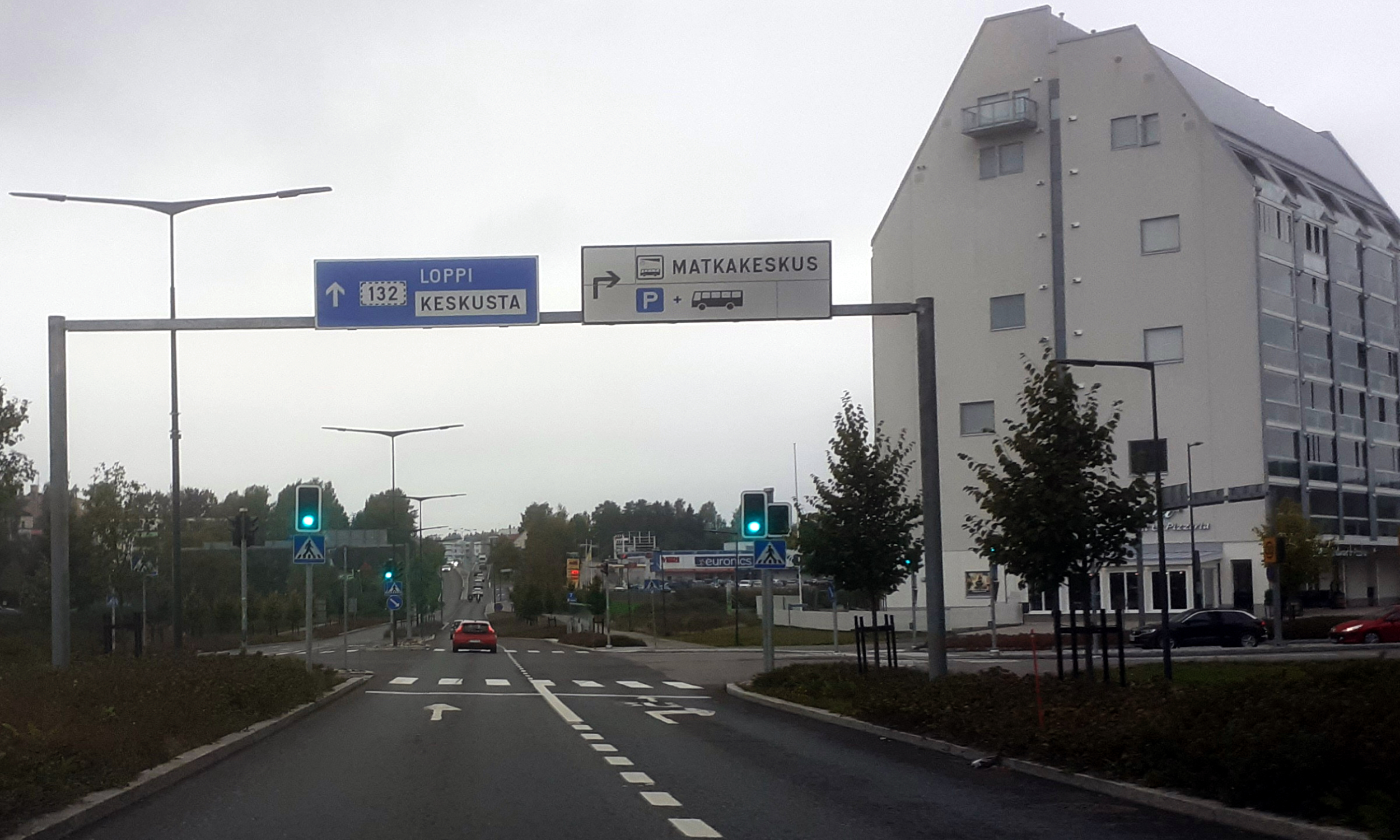
The Viirinlaakso area in September 2021.

There are several residential areas in Klaukkala, including Haikala, Harjula, Lintumetsä, Mäntysalo, Pietarinmäki, Pikimetsä, Ropakko, Syrjälä, Talvisto and Toivola. Of the above-mentioned areas, for example, the largest suburban neighborhood Harjula has more than 2000 inhabitants. In 2017, the construction of the new center of the Klaukkala, Viirinlaakso, was started, and there will be seven new apartment buildings. Another planned residential area is Vanha-Klaukka, which will appear in the western part of Klaukkala; it is estimated to increase Klaukkala's population by about 2,000 and make the road between Klaukkala and the neighboring village Lepsämä more street-like with possible traffic light intersections.

There is also one industrial and business area in village, Järvihaka, right by Lake Valkjärvi. The area includes at least 20-30 companies and a couple of lunch restaurants. Later in the future, a new industrial areas is planned: one for Mäyränkallio between Metsäkylä village and the old highway of Hämeenlinna (Mt 130), and another for Sudentulli between Numlahti village and Mäntysalo area.

=== Features ===
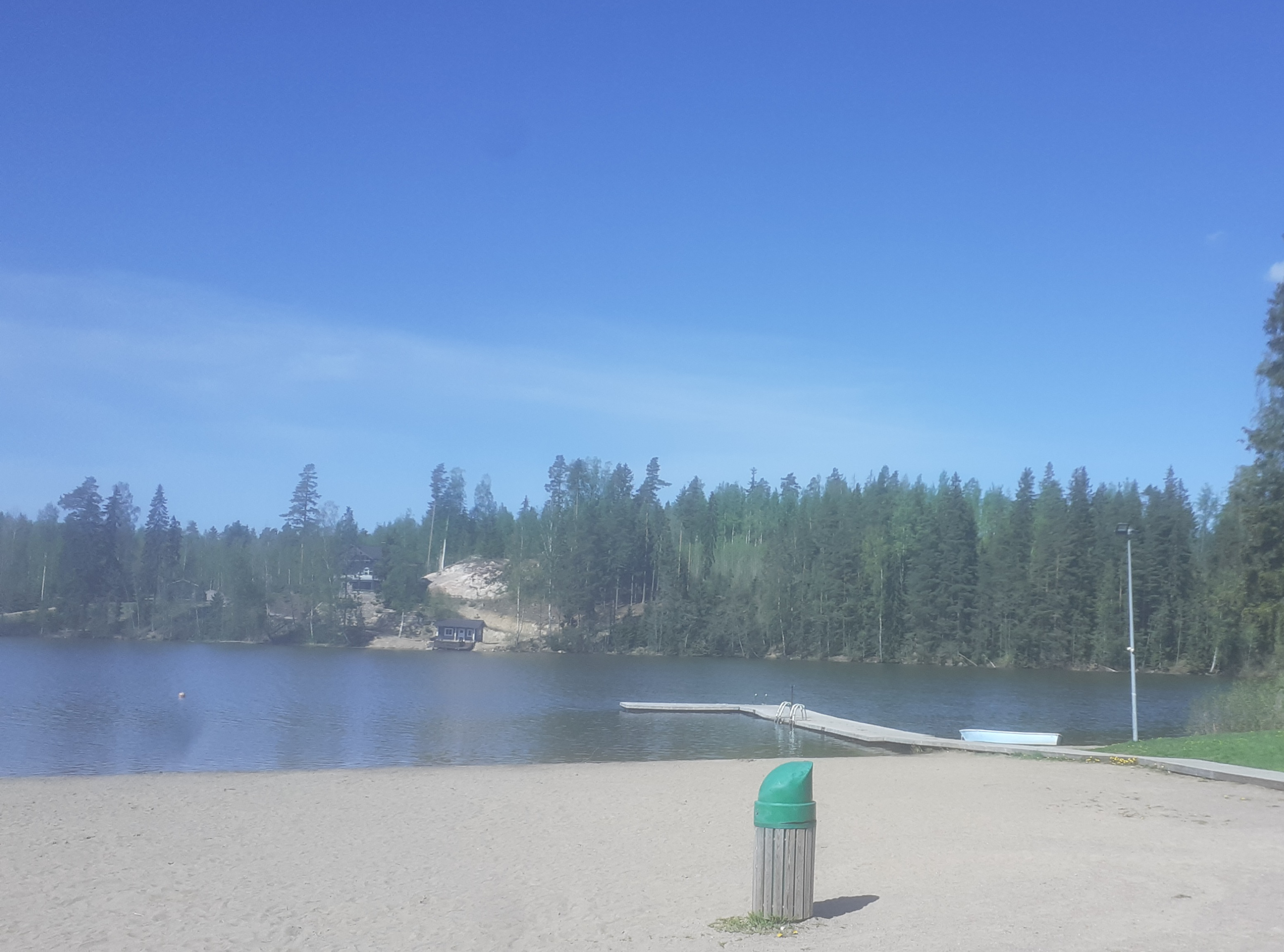
Tiiranranta Beach of Lake Valkjärvi in Klaukkala.

Klaukkala encompasses about 43 square kilometres (about 17 sq mi). The village is mostly suburban and urban area with some rural landscape. Next to the village is the lushest lake of Nurmijärvi, Lake Valkjärvi, encompassing about 1,5 square kilometres (about 0,6 sq mi), which flows as the River Luhtajoki from the north of the village to the east and southeast into the River Vantaa. In the south, there is another river called Lepsämänjoki, which also flow into the River Vantaa. Located in the southern part of Klaukkala village, Isosuo is a 366-acre marshland. Isosuo is part of the Natura 2000 program and is also included in the state's mire protection program, which is why the marsh is almost entirely state owned. The predominant habitat type of the Natura Habitats Directive is the raised bog, but it also has some the poor fen.

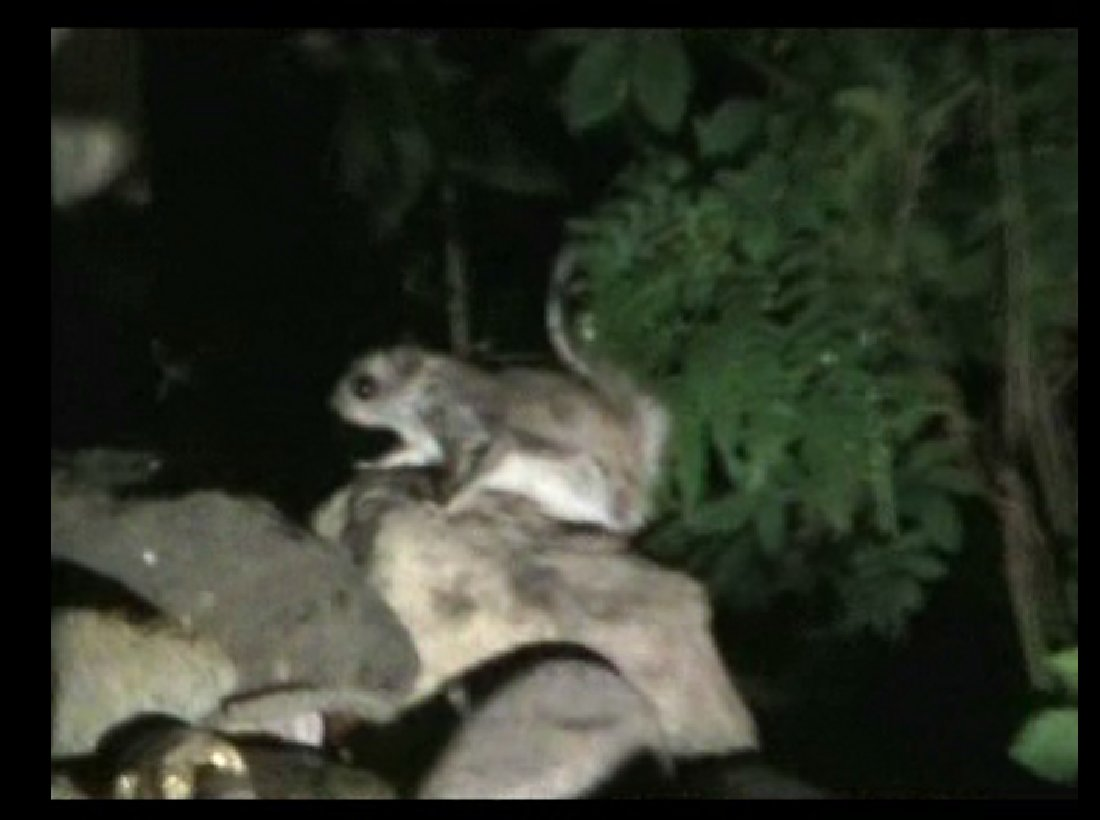
The Siberian flying squirrel, defined as a vulnerable species in Finland, has often acted as a brake on Klaukkala's development. This flying squirrel was photographed in Klaukkala at the night in 2006.

In the middle of the village is the large rock called Vaskomäki, which at the highest point of village emphasizes the identity of the Klaukkala and which is popular with local climbers. In cooperation with the municipality, HOK-Elanto is negotiating the future of the plots. As early as 1996, the Rotary Club of Klaukkala presented the municipality with a plan for an indoor swimming pool, a shelter and a multipurpose facility inside Vaskomäki. Admittedly, Vaskomäki's mining has strongly divided opinions.

Another noteworthy high point in village is Tornimäki near the residential areas of Harjula and Syrjälä, where the resort center Klaukkalan Tornikeskus is located. This resort offers mountain biking in summer and snowtubing in winter. In May 2019, a fitness staircase with 348 stairsteps (formerly 337 stairsteps originally intended to be based on the literary production of Aleksis Kivi) was officially launched at the Tornikeskus. Before that, the stairs contract was tendered twice, but no contractor was found either time. In the end, the stairs were decided to be purchased directly and they received a government subsidy of €70,000. Stairway construction started in fall 2018. In less than a month since its inauguration, stairs has gained great popularity.

About a kilometer from the Klaukkala central, there is a farm called Ali-Ollin Alpakkatila, which is known for alpacas. The farm offers pony rides and agilities with alpacas, which is a specialty of the farm.

== Infrastructure ==
=== Transport ===
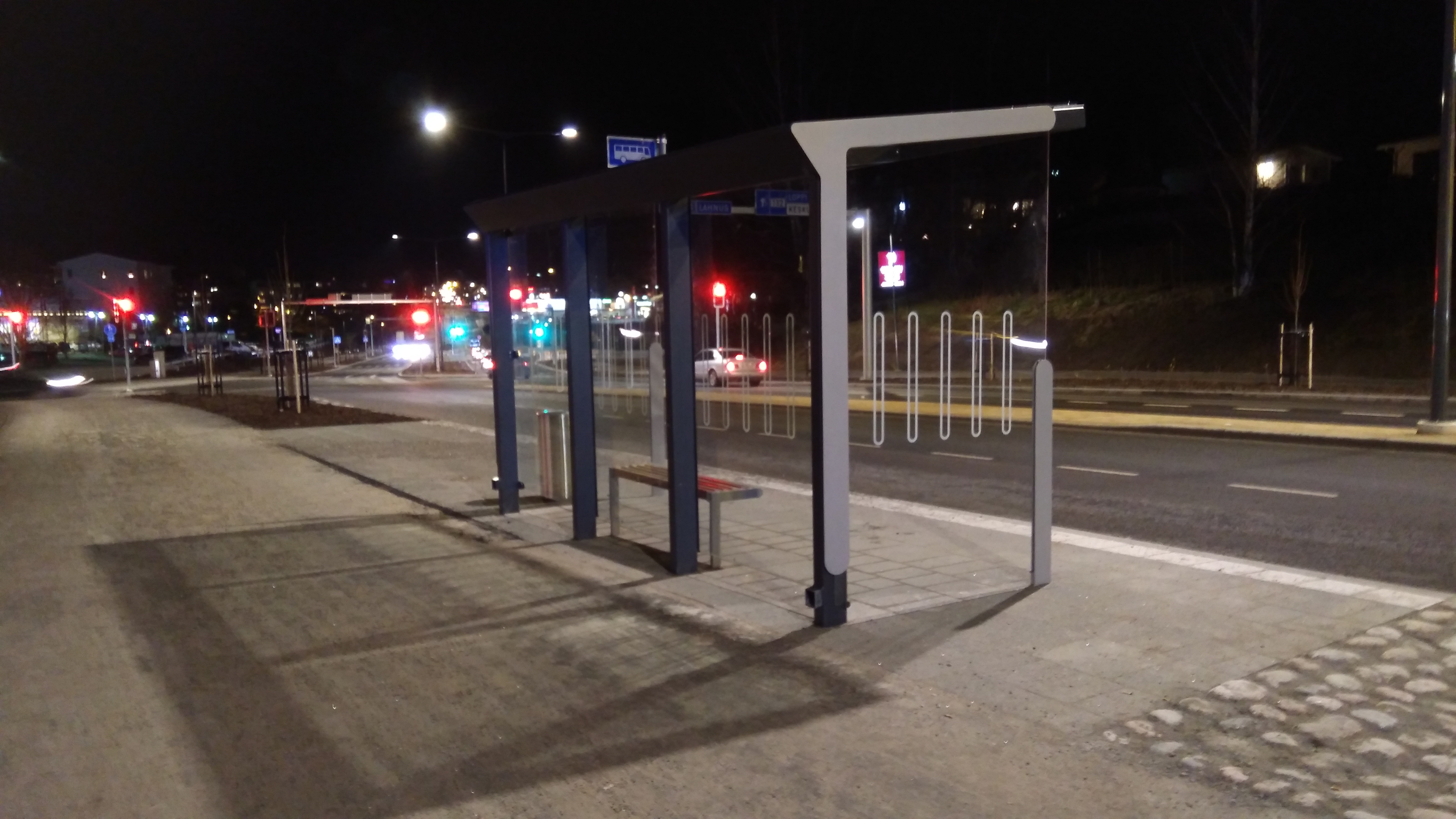
A bus stop near to Viirinlaakso.

The ribbon structure of the Klaukkala has been built on along the Finnish regional road 132 (Mt 132), which serves as a road connection from Finnish national road 3 to Loppi. Back in the late 1950s, it was the original main road before the current freeway, and in addition to passing through Loppi, it continued through the remote forest areas of Janakkala all the way to Hämeenlinna. And before the completion of the current Finnish national road 2, it also served the traffic of Forssa and Pori, which passed through Loppi and Tammela.

The increased traffic, resulting from the increase in population causes problems in the Road 132, especially main challenge is the highly congested main street of Klaukkala, which is used by about 17,000 vehicles per day. Because of this, a new road line, the so-called "Klaukkala bypass", of Road 132 between freeway and Numlahti village to get around Klaukkala from the north is being planned since the 1980s, and possibly also a rail traffic connection to Helsinki, probably as a continuation of the Vantaankoski rail. However, the train track plan is likely to be rejected, but it has been proposed to handle traffic by super bus or light rail. The Klaukkala bypass is estimated to be completed in fall 2021, but despite initial estimates, construction work on the bypass has progressed faster than expected and will be opened to traffic in November 2020. According to current plans, the Klaukkala bypass would be to continue eastbound towards Tuusula in connection with the planned "Ring IV" project, which is being funded in particular by the Tuusula municipality.

In the under constructed Viirinlaakso area, there are a new transport hub called Klaukkala Travel Center (Klaukkalan Matkakeskus) with a new bus station. There are bus connections from Klaukkala to Helsinki, Kivistö of Vantaa, Hyvinkää, Loppi and elsewhere to Nurmijärvi. Bus traffic on Nurmijärvi is operated by the bus company Korsisaari.

=== Services and buildings ===
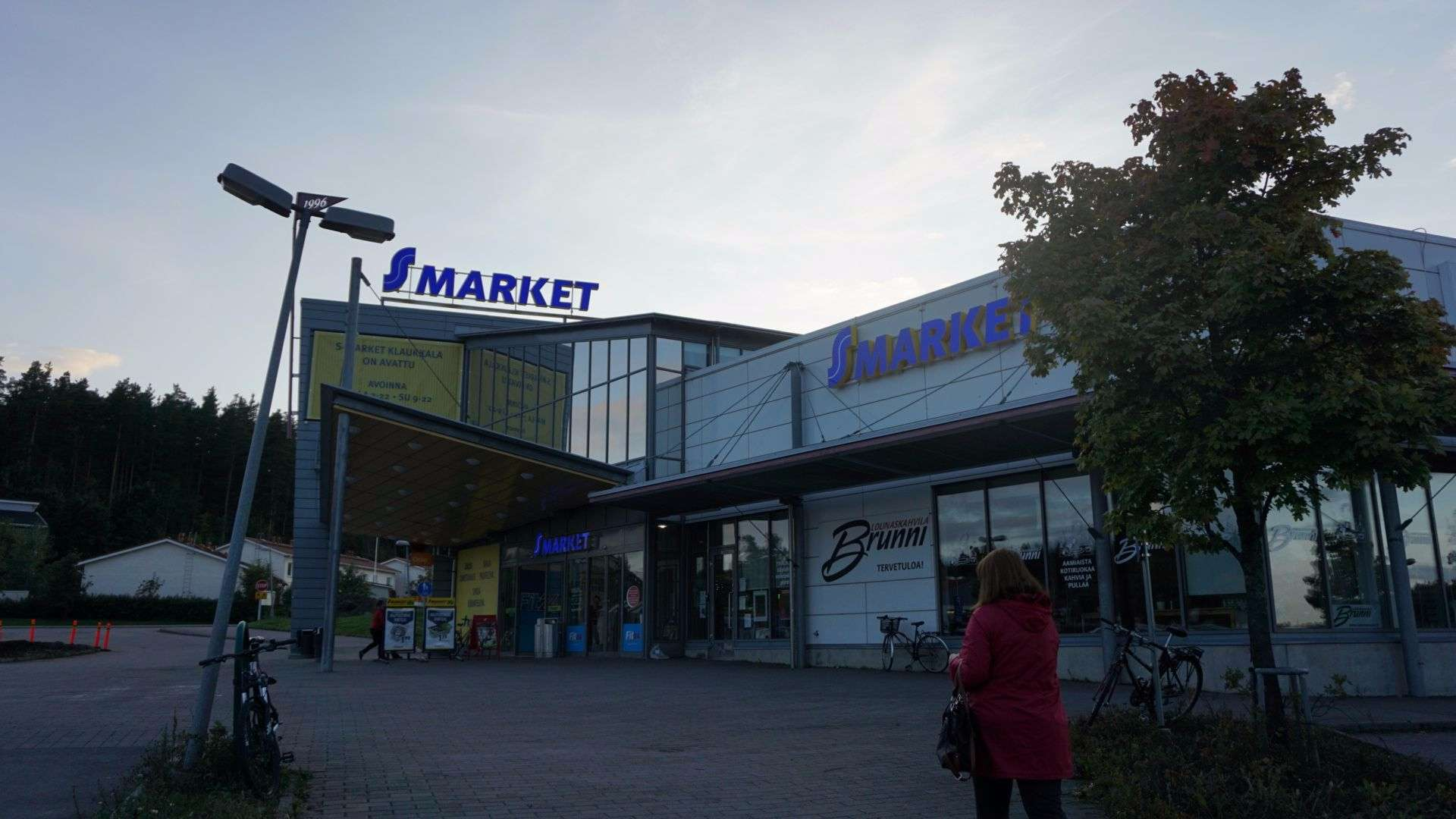
The S-Market grocery store.

Klaukkala has several grocery stores and one shopping mall called Viiri, which includes K-Citymarket and 17 other stores. Along the Lahnus road (Lahnuksentie), another shopping mall called Kauppakeskus Brunni is home to the S Group-owned S-Market, where it moved from the old center of Klaukkala in 2016. The formerly dilapidated S-Market building from the 1970s along the Lepsämä road (Lepsämäntie), would be demolished and a new store replaced. The locals had hoped to replace the building with hypermarket Prisma, but according to HOK-Elanto, Klaukkala would get another S-Market, but it will become HOK-Elanto's largest S-Market store in size and range.

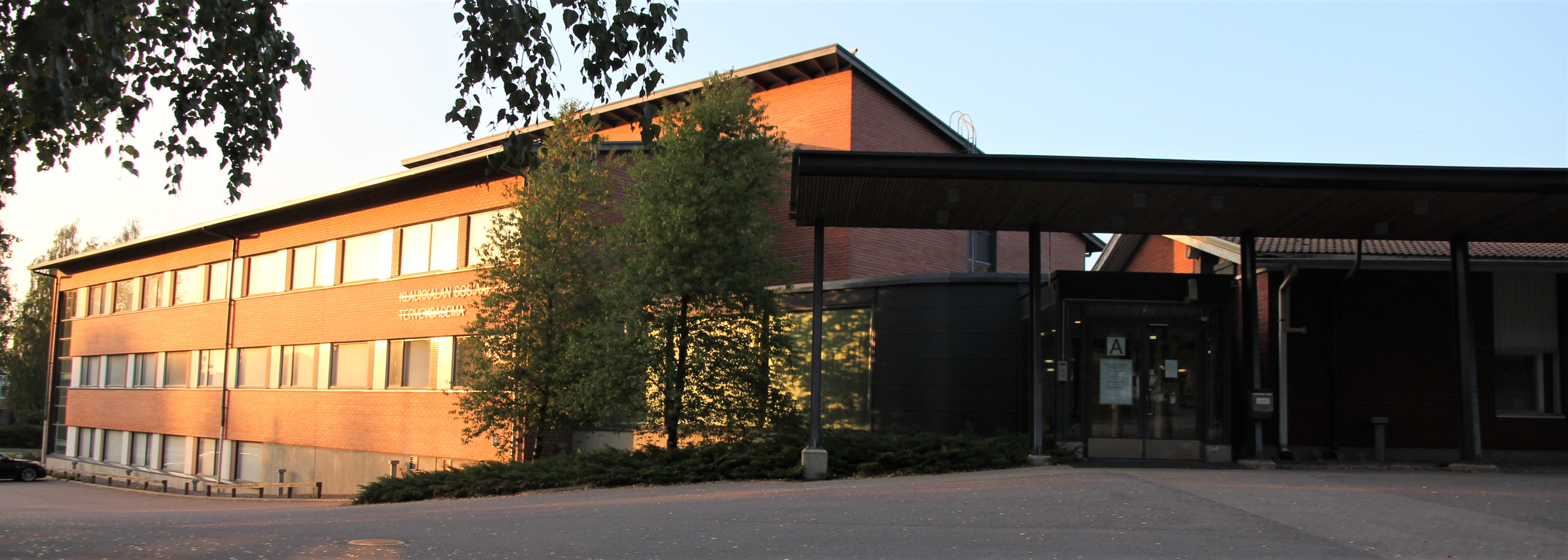
A community health center.

Also, Klaukkala's service portfolio includes a community health center, a public library, opticians, a pharmacy (another is planned), two municipal dental clinics and a private dentist, three bank offices (including Osuuspankki and Nordea offices) and two hardware stores, Tokmanni and K-Rauta. For pets, there is a veterinary clinic in Klaukkala and two pet food stores. There are also about 10–20 dining places in the Klaukkala.

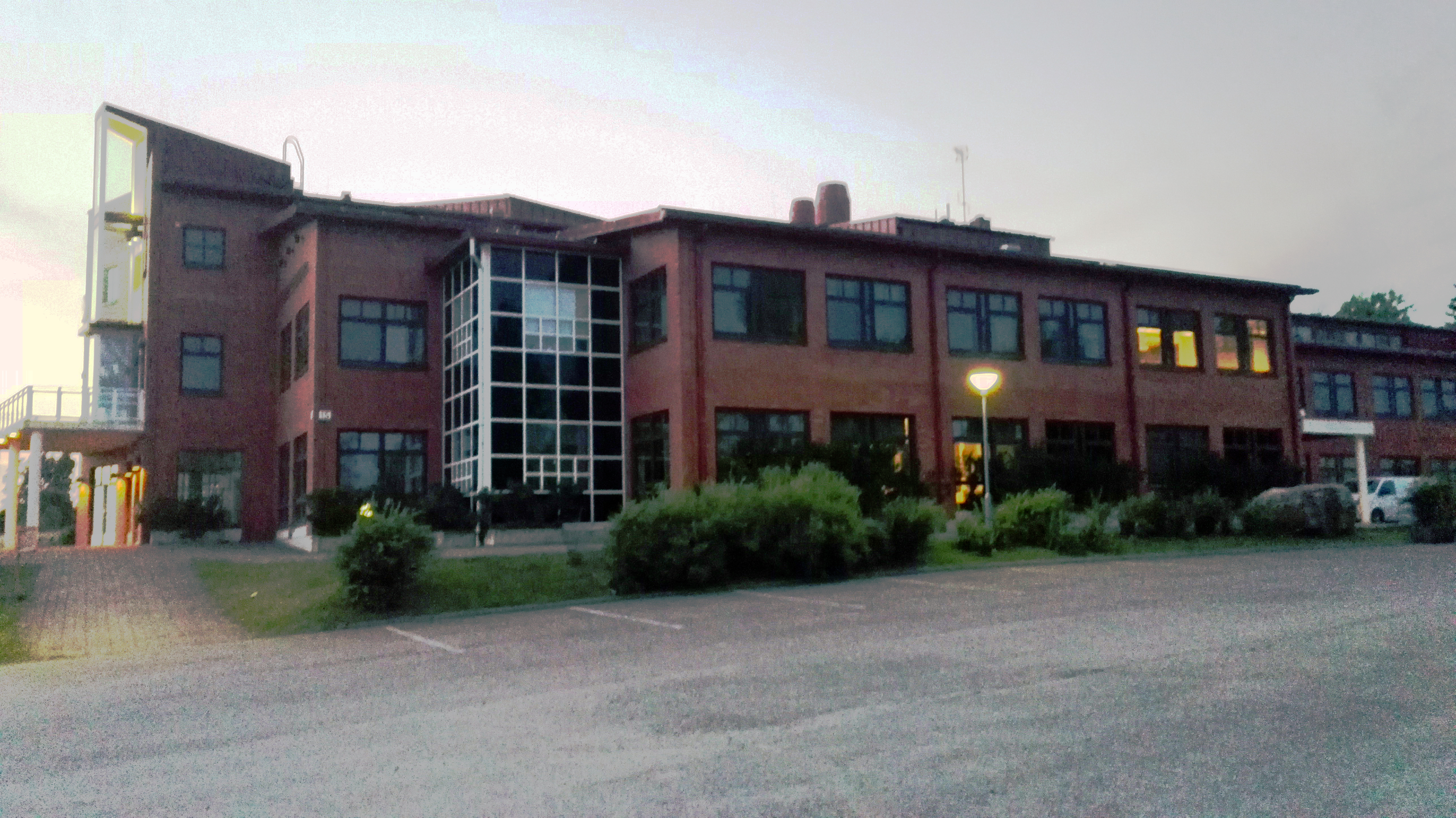
Arkadian yhteislyseo, a gymnasium in Klaukkala.

Klaukkala includes many primary schools, of which the largest is Isoniittu School (Isoniitun koulu), which includes all nine grades of the Finnish primary school system. There is also a primary school of Swedish, Vendlaskolan, located on the same property as the Syrjälä School. Klaukkala also has one of the three gymnasiums of Nurmijärvi, Arkadia Joint Lyceum (Arkadian yhteislyseo). A new children's indoor playground, Play Jays, was opened along the Kuonomäki road (Kuonomäentie) in August 2019 but it was closed in May 2020 due to high rental costs and the COVID-19 pandemic.

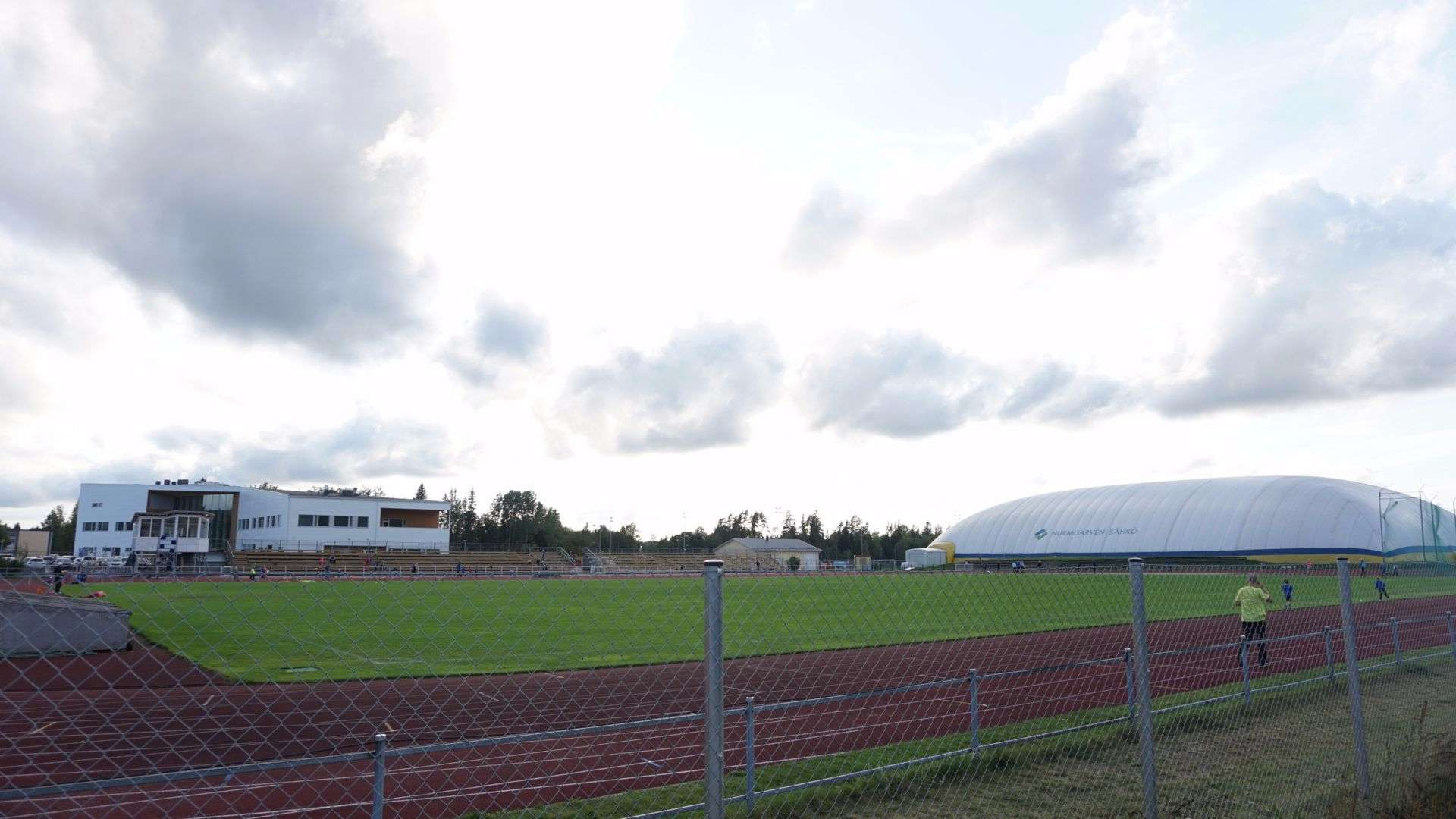
Klaukkala's sports area is the largest and most comprehensive in the Nurmijärvi municipality.

In 2017 a new multipurpose building called "Monikko" was built, to the Klaukkala sports area. Monikko hosts a number of events, including entertainment as music and stand-up shows. Tennis, squash and ice hockey halls are also located near the sports area along the Lepsämä road. Many of Nurmijärvi's sports clubs operates in Klaukkala, such as SB-Pro and Nurmijärven Jalkapalloseura (also in Rajamäki).

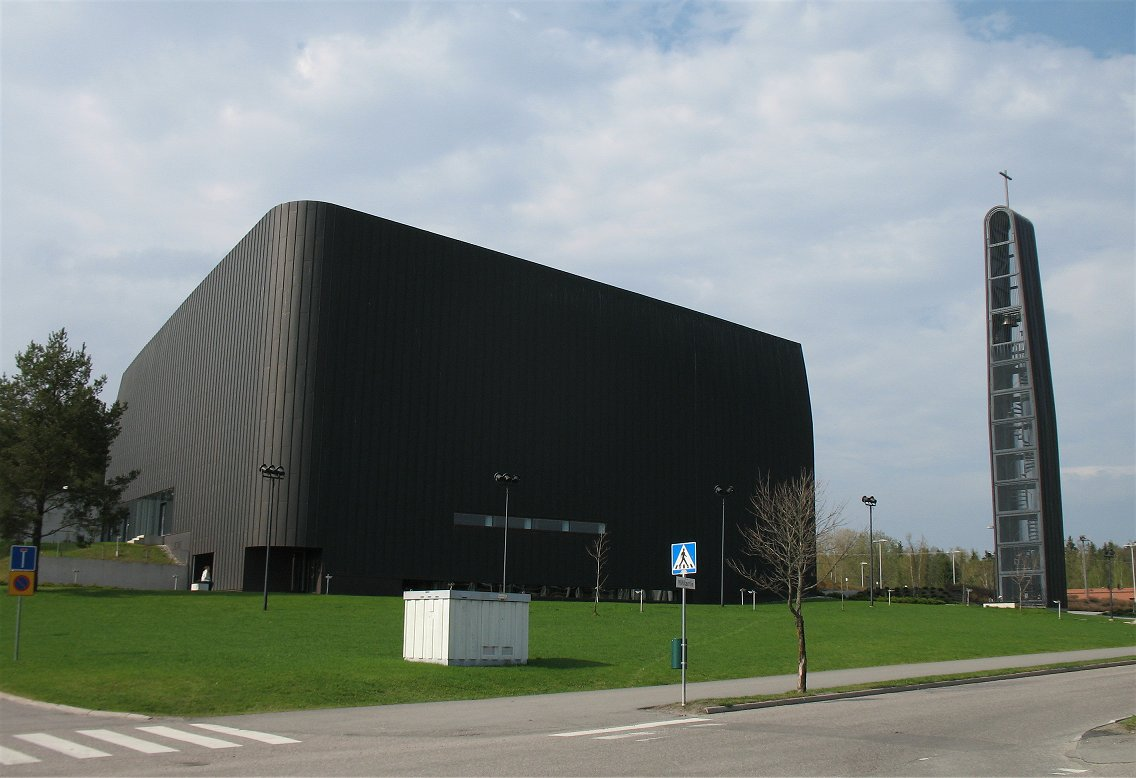
The modern-styled Lutheran Klaukkala Church from 2004.

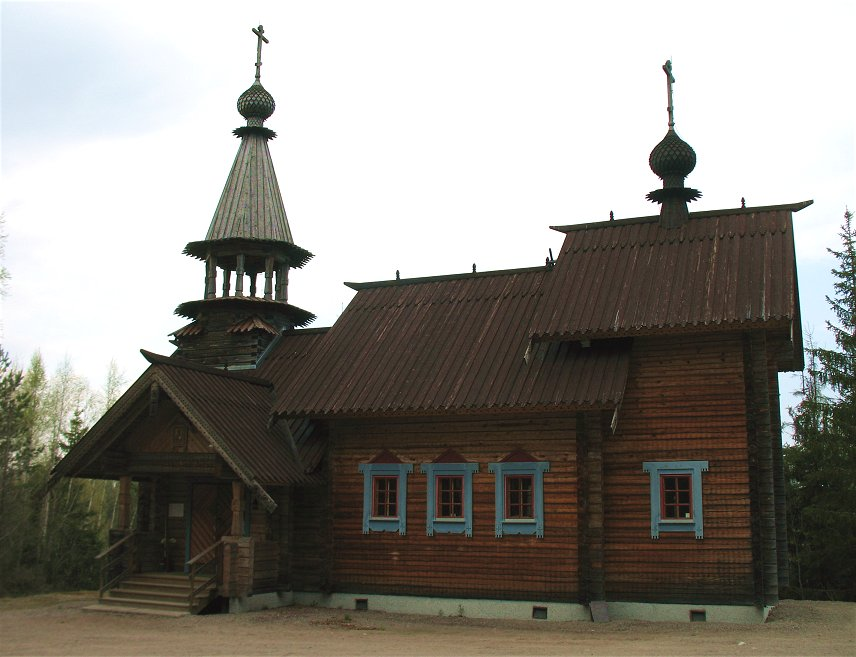
The Orthodox church of Saint Nectarios of Aegina is located on the outskirts of the village.

A possible tourism sight is modern-styled, copper-plated Klaukkala Church, designed by architect Anssi Lassila, in the old center of Klaukkala. Mikko Heikka, a bishop of the Evangelic Lutheran Church, dedicated it on November 28, 2004. The village also has a wooden Orthodox church of Saint Nectarios of Aegina, built in 1995. Before both churches, there was only a parish centre in Klaukkala, completed in 1973, which is located in the immediate vicinity of the current church.

Nurmijärven Uutiset, a local free newspaper of the Nurmijärvi municipality, is headquartered in Klaukkala.

== Notable people ==
- Riikka Honkanen (born 1998), alpine ski racer
- Kalle Johansson, known as Eno Kalle (1884–1941), poet
- Linde Lindström (born 1976), guitarist of HIM
- Aimo Mustonen (1909–1994), composer
- Aki Sirkesalo (1962–2004), singer
- Timo Tolkki (born 1966), ex-guitarist of Stratovarius

Lepsämä, a neighboring village next to Klaukkala, is the place where the former Prime Minister of Finland Matti Vanhanen currently lives. Before that, he lived in Lintumetsä on the outskirts of the village, which belongs to Klaukkala.

== See also ==
- Lahnus, a district of Espoo
- Lepsämä, a neighboring village near Klaukkala
- Luhtaanmäki, a district of Vantaa
- Nurmijärven Jalkapalloseura, a local football club
- SB-Pro, a local floorball club
- Viiri, a shopping centre in Viirinlaakso, Klaukkala

== Sources ==
- Kalliola, Matti (2011). Ison kylän tarina: Klaukkalan kyläkirja. Klaukkalan kyläkirjatoimikunta. ISBN 978-952-92-8810-6.
