= The Life of Aleksis Kivi =

- Original Finnish film poster
- Finnish: Aleksis Kiven elämä
- Directed by: Jari Halonen
- Written by: Jari Halonen; Jorma Tommila; Kauko Röyhkä
- Produced by: Jari Halonen; Heikki Ahonius
- Starring: Marko Tiusanen; Jari Salmi
- Cinematography: Olli Varja
- Edited by: Akke Eklund
- Music by: Tuomas Kantelinen
- Production company: Seppä Callahanin Filmimaailma
- Release date: 18 January 2002 (Finland)
- Running time: 105 minutes
- Country: Finland
- Languages: Finnish, Swedish
- Budget: FIM 1,5 million

The Life of Aleksis Kivi (Finnish: Aleksis Kiven elämä) is a 2002 Finnish biographical drama film directed by Jari Halonen, telling the story of Aleksis Kivi (1834–1872), the national writer of Finland.

In addition to Jari Halonen, the film's script was written by musician and writer Kauko Röyhkä and actor Jorma Tommila. In the film, Aleksis Kivi was played by Marko Tiusanen and Kivi's closest friend Emil Nervander was played by Jari Salmi. Veikko Sinisalo, who played Aleksis Kivi's father, will also be seen in the film in his last film role.

The film received three Jussi Awards nominations for best direction (Jari Halonen), editing (Akke Eklund) and music (Tuomas Kantelinen), but did not win any of them.

== Plot ==
The year 1858 in the Grand Duchy of Finland. Aleksis Stenvall, who had completed his matriculation a year earlier but had no money, is seeking the popularity of society. He gets to take the bear he felled with his fellow student Emil Nervander and take the bear's harness to Amalia Rosencrantz's party in Helsinki. The event honors the poet J. L. Runeberg by performing his poems Bonden Paavo and Vårt land. Aleksis shocks the audience by reciting his poem Suomenmaa in Finnish, because only Swedish is considered an accepted language of poetry. Aleksis gets to know Albina Palmqvist, Amalia Rosencrantz's niece, at the carnival, where Senator J. V. Snellman presents the idea of creating Finnish-language culture and literature. Albina considers Finnish to be a losing national language. Aleksis takes Albina among the Finnish people, inviting her to his home village Palojoki. Aleksis proposes to Albina, but Amalia Rosencrantz expresses her negative attitude to the proposal. Aleksis is very upset by this.

Five years pass. During that time, Aleksis has given up his original career as a priest and decided to become a writer, now using the pen name Aleksis Kivi. When the worst language dispute prevails, he throws himself into an argument with the pro-Swedish Henrik Lax at the university, which ends in a fight. Professor Fredrik Cygnaeus calms down the situation just before Finnish language professor August Ahlqvist arrives with the gendarmes. Cygnaeus introduces Aleksis, who gained fame with his Kullervo play, to Ahlqvist. When Aleksis makes a joke at Ahlqvist's expense, Cygnaeus warns him not to make such an influential man an enemy.

Aleksis is writing his play Heath Cobblers in the yard of widow Mrs. Charlotta Lönnqvist's cottage in Fanjunkars, Siuntio. He gets into an argument with the neighboring host Mr. Skog about the status of the Finnish language. Charlotta falls in love with the passionate artist. The Imperial Senate publishes a letter of order for the National Literary Competition. Runeberg's supporters and Ahlqvist take turns to celebrate the victory of the competition as their own, but at Cygnaeus' suggestion Kivi's Heath Cobblers is named the recipient of the 2,500 Finnish mark state award, which Ahlqvist in particular is upset about. Nervander organizes a party where Kaarlo Bergbom promises to found a Finnish-language theater if Aleksis writes plays to be performed.Cygnaeus raises a toast to Kivi and Finnish culture. The event is interrupted by the news that Aleksis' father is dying.

The famine years begin in Finland, and in 1868 around 140,000 people die. The estate of Fanjunkars is threatened with bankruptcy due to debts. Mr. Skog blames the predicament on Aleksis, who has not paid for his housing; there are even rumors of clandestine sex in the parish. Aleksis defends Charlotta's honor and promises to get the money. Bergbom directs Kivi's Lea as the first theater performance in Finnish. Aleksis gets drunk, but writes frantically day and night in the garden cabin about his first and only novel, The Seven Men, until exhausted and ends the work by correcting the title to The Seven Brothers. Charlotta finds the man unconscious. After the publication of the work, Ahlqvist gives it a slanderous review. In a fit of emotion, Emil reminds Cygnaeus and Bergbom that they "hired" Aleksis to create Finnish literature, and now they are abandoning him to a mental hospital.

In 1872, Emil and Aleksis' brother pick up the writer from the mental hospital. The doctor says that Aleksis is not crazy in the way people are crazy, but typhoid fever and excessive alcohol consumption have weakened him. In the summer, Aleksis feels that his strength is slowly returning in his brother's home in Tuusula. He finds himself in the forest again and climbs a rock, from where he watches the circle of the world. The film ends with the citation of "Squirrel's Song" poem from The Seven Brothers.

== Cast ==
- Marko Tiusanen as Aleksis Stenvall/Aleksis Kivi
- Jari Salmi as Emil Nervander
- Karoliina Kudjoi as Albina Palmqvist
- Sue Lemström as Charlotta Lönnqvist
- Margit Lindeman as Amalia Rosencrantz
- Gustav Wiklund as J. V. Snellman
- Esko Hukkanen as J. L. Runeberg
- Inga-Liisa Laukka as Fredrika Runeberg
- Veikko Sinisalo as Eerikki Stenvall
- Arja Pessa as Annastina Stenvall
- Antti Reini as Kaarlo Bergbom
- Hannu Huuska as Fredrik Cygnaeus
- Jari Halonen as August Ahlqvist

The film also features the theatrical director and writer Jouko Turkka in a short supporting role.

== See also ==
- List of biographical films
- Sibelius (film)
