= Douglas Robinson (academic) =

American academic and author (1954-)

Douglas Robinson (born September 30, 1954) is an American academic scholar, translator, and fiction-writer who is best known for his work in translation studies, but has published widely on various aspects of human communication and social interaction (American literature, literary theory, linguistic theory, gender studies, writing theory, rhetorical theory). He has translated several Finnish novels, plays, and monographs into English, and his first published novel was written in English but first published in Finnish translation.

Robinson recently retired as Professor of Translating and Interpreting at the Chinese University of Hong Kong, Shenzhen, and has been hired as a research professor in Translation Studies at Xi'an International Studies University, where he also directs the Douglas Robinson Research Center. He is also emeritus professor of translation, interpreting, and intercultural studies at Hong Kong Baptist University.

== Biography ==
Robinson was born in Lafayette, Indiana, to Don and Berta Robinson; his younger brother is automobile designer Michael Robinson. He lived in the Whittier/La Habra Heights, California area until he was 13; in the summer of 1968 his parents moved the family to the Pacific Northwest, where he attended Tahoma Senior High School in Maple Valley, Washington. He spent his freshman year of college at Linfield College and his sophomore year at The Evergreen State College. An exchange year with YFU (1971–1972) in Finland led to his spending a total of 14 years there, completing his undergraduate degree and two postgraduate degrees and serving six years (1975–1981) as a lecturer in English at the University of Jyväskylä, then six more years as Assistant/Associate Professor of English (1983–1987) and English-Finnish Translation Theory and Practice (1987–1989) at the University of Tampere. In between, Robinson returned to the Pacific Northwest, earning his PhD from the University of Washington in 1983, with a dissertation entitled American Apocalypses directed by Leroy Searle.

In 1989 Robinson accepted a job as assistant professor of English at the University of Mississippi, Oxford, where he worked for the next 21 years, the last three as Director of First-Year Writing. During that time he also spent one semester (spring 1999) as acting director of the MFA Program in Translation at the University of Iowa, one semester (1999–2000) as a Senior Fulbright Lecturer at the University of Vic, Catalonia, and one year (2005–2006) as a Senior Fulbright Lecturer at Voronezh State University, Russia.

In 2010 Robinson was appointed Tong Tin Sun Chair Professor of English and Head of the English Department at Lingnan University, and in 2012 as Chair Professor of English and Dean of Arts at Hong Kong Baptist University. He stepped down from the Deanship at the end of his first three-year term, August 31, 2015, but continued as Chair Professor of English until August 31, 2020, when he became Professor of Translating and Interpreting at the Chinese University of Hong Kong, Shenzhen and emeritus professor of translation, tnterpreting, and intercultural studies at HKBU. Upon his retirement from CUHK-Shenzhen he was hired as a research professor in translation studies and director of the Douglas Robinson Research Center at Xi'an International Studies University.

== Work ==
=== Research fields ===
Robinson has published in a number of fields related generally to human communication: literary studies, language studies, translation studies, postcolonial studies, rhetoric, and philosophy of mind/philosophy of language. He has also published translations from Finnish to English, a novel in Finnish translation, and several textbooks, two for Finnish students of English and one each for students of translation, linguistic pragmatics, and writing. In 1989 he and Ilkka Rekiaro also coauthored a Finnish-English-Finnish dictionary, with 25,000 entries in each direction.

=== Thought ===
The two scarlet threads running all through Robinson's work since The Translator's Turn (1991) are somaticity and performativity—the imperfect social regulation of human communicative and other interaction as inwardly felt (the somatic) and outwardly staged (the performative). In his more recent work he has begun to theorize "icosis" as the becoming-true or becoming-real of group opinion, through a mass persuasion/plausibilization process channeled through the somatic exchange, and "ecosis" as the becoming-good of the community, or the becoming-communal of goodness.

A third focal concern in his work is the impact of religion on sociocultural history and generally human social interaction in the West, from his 1983 Ph.D. dissertation on images of the end of the world in American literature through the history of Christianity and spirit-channeling to the ancient mystery religions. His recent work has explored the deep ecology of rhetoric in Chinese Confucianism, especially Mencius.

His recent work has been in experimental translation (both theorizing it and practicing it).

=== Reception in China ===
While Robinson's influence on the field of translation studies in particular is global, his work has been especially enthusiastically received in China. Lin Zhu's book on his work, The Translator-Centered Multidisciplinary Construction, was originally written as a doctoral dissertation at Nankai University, in Tianjin, PRC; and as Robinson himself notes in his foreword to that book, Chinese responses to his work almost always seem to display a complex appreciation of the middle ground he explores between thinking and feeling—whereas there is a tendency in the West to binarize the two, so that any talk of feeling gets read as implying a complete exclusion of both analytical thought and collective social regulation. In her book Dr. Zhu responds extensively to this Chinese reception of Robinson's thought, noting problems of emphasis and focus, identifying nuance errors in both Chinese translations and paraphrases of his work; but, perhaps because of the "ecological" tendencies of ancient Chinese thought in the Daoist, Confucian, and Buddhist traditions, and the focus in Confucius and Mencius on feeling as the root of all human ethical growth, Chinese scholars typically lack the inclination often found in Western scholars to relegate feeling to pure random idiosyncratic body states.

=== Selected publications ===
Google Scholar citations

==== Scholarly monographs ====
- John Barth's Giles Goat-Boy: A Study. University of Jyväskylä, 1980.
- American Apocalypses: The Image of the End of the World in American Literature. Baltimore: Johns Hopkins University Press, 1985.
- The Translator's Turn. Baltimore: Johns Hopkins University Press, 1991.
- Ring Lardner and the Other. New York: Oxford University Press, 1992.
- No Less a Man: Masculist Art in a Feminist Age. Bowling Green, OH: Bowling Green State University Popular Press, 1994.
- Translation and Taboo. DeKalb: Northern Illinois University Press, 1996.
- Translation and Empire: Postcolonial Approaches Explained. A volume in the Translation Theories Explored series. Manchester: St. Jerome Publishing, 1997.
- What Is Translation? Centrifugal Theories, Critical Interventions. Kent, OH: Kent State University Press, 1997.
- Who Translates? Translator Subjectivities Beyond Reason. Albany: SUNY Press, 2001.
- Performative Linguistics: Speaking and Translating as Doing Things With Words. London: Routledge, 2003.
- Estrangement and the Somatics of Literature: Tolstoy, Shklovsky, Brecht. Baltimore: Johns Hopkins University Press, 2008.
- Translation and the Problem of Sway. Amsterdam and Philadelphia: John Benjamins, 2011.
- First-Year Writing and the Somatic Exchange. New York: Hampton, 2012.
- Feeling Extended: Sociality as Extended Body-Becoming-Mind. Bucharest: Zeta Books, 2013.
- Displacement and the Somatics of Postcolonial Culture. Columbus: Ohio State University Press, 2013.
- The Dao of Translation: An East-West Dialogue. London and Singapore: Routledge, 2015.
- The Deep Ecology of Rhetoric in Mencius and Aristotle. Albany: SUNY Press, 2016.
- Semiotranslating Peirce. Tartu, Estonia: University of Tartu Press, 2016.
- Exorcising Translation: Towards an Intercivilizational Turn. New York: Bloomsbury, 2017.
- Critical Translation Studies. London and Singapore: Routledge, 2017.
- Aleksis Kivi and/as World Literature. Leiden and Boston: Brill, 2017.
- Translationality: Essays in the Translational-Medical Humanities. London and Singapore: Routledge, 2017.
- Transgender, Translation, Translingual Address. New York: Bloomsbury Academic, 2019.
- Priming Translation: Cognitive, Affective, and Social Factors. London and New York: Routledge, 2021.
- Translating the Monster: Volter Kilpi in Orbit Beyond (Un)translatability. Leiden and Boston: Brill, 2023.
- The Behavioral Economics of Translation. London and New York: Routledge, 2023.
- The Experimental Translator. London and New York: Palgrave Macmillan, 2023.
- Questions for Translation Studies. Amsterdam and Philadelphia: John Benjamins, 2023.
- Translator, Touretter: Avant-Garde Translation and the Touretter Sublime. Leiden and Boston: Brill, 2024.
- Translating the Nonhuman: What Science Fiction Can Teach Us About Translating. Bloomsbury Academic, 2024.
- Lessons Experimental Translators Can Learn from Finnegans Wake: Translouting that Gaswind into Turfish. London and New York: Routledge, 2025.
- Coauthored with Xiaorui Sun. Translation, Pornography, Performativity: Experimenting with That Dangerous Supplement. London and New York: Routledge, 2025.
- A Zombie Theory of Translation; or, What is a "Revenant" Translation? Cambridge, UK, and New York: Cambridge Elements, 2025.
- Translation (Theory) as an Assemblage: Seven Rhizomatic Plateaus. London and New York: Routledge, 2026.
- Coauthored with Xiaorui Sun. Interepistemic Translation: Sense-Making Encounters Between “China” and “the West”. London and New York: Bloomsbury Academic.

==== Anthology ====
- Western Translation Theory from Herodotus to Nietzsche. Manchester, UK: St. Jerome, 1997. Revised paperback edition, 2002. Reprint, Routledge, 2014. Expanded fourth edition, Routledge, 2026.

==== Essay collection ====
- The Pushing-Hands of Translation and its Theory: In Memoriam Martha Cheung, 1953–2013. London and Singapore: Routledge, 2016.

==== Textbooks ====
- With Diana Webster, Liisa Elonen, Leena Kirveskari, Seppo Tella, and Thelma Wiik. Jet Set 9. Helsinki: Otava, 1982.
- With Vesa Häggblom: The Light Fantastic. Helsinki: Otava, 1983.
- Becoming a Translator: An Accelerated Course. London and New York: Routledge, 1997. Second ed., Becoming a Translator: An Introduction to the theory and Practice of Translation, 2003. Third ed., 2012. Fourth ed., 2020.
- Introducing Performative Pragmatics. London and New York: Routledge, 2006.
- With Svetlana Ilinskaya: Writing as Drama. Custom-published by McGraw–Hill Learning Solutions for the University of Mississippi, 2007–2010.
- Lifewriting as Drama. An e-textbook adapted from Writing as Drama for the iPad, 2011.

==== Selected translations from Finnish ====
- Yrjö Varpio, The History of Finnish Literary Criticism, 1808–1918 (Finnish original: Suomalaisen kirjallisuudentutkimuksen historia, 1808–1918). Tampere: Hermes, 1990.
- Aleksis Kivi, Heath Cobblers (Finnish original: Nummisuutarit) and Kullervo. St. Cloud, MN: North Star Press of St. Cloud, 1993.
- Maaria Koskiluoma, Tottering House (Finnish original: Huojuva talo, 1983), stage adaptation of Maria Jotuni, Huojuva talo (1930s, published posthumously, 1963). Produced at the Frank Theatre, Minneapolis, MN, March–April 1994.
- Elina Hirvonen, When I Forgot (Finnish original: Että hän muistaisi saman). UK edition, London: Portobello Books, 2007. US edition, Portland: Tin House, 2009.
- Arto Paasilinna, A Charming Little Mass Suicide (Finnish original: Hurmaava joukkoitsemurha). Porvoo: WSOY, forthcoming.
- Tuomas Kyrö, Griped (Finnish original: Mielensäpahoittaja). Porvoo: WSOY, forthcoming.
- Aleksis Kivi, The Brothers Seven. Bucharest: Zeta Books, 2017.
- Mia Kankimäki, The Women I Think About At Night (Finnish original: Naiset joita ajattelen öisin). New York: Simon & Schuster, 2020.
- Volter Kilpi, Gulliver's Voyage to Phantomimia (Finnish original: Gulliverin matka Fantomimian mantereelle, 1944). Bucharest: Zeta Books, 2020.

==== Novels ====
- Pentinpeijaiset ("Pentti's Wake"). Translated into Finnish by Kimmo Lilja from Robinson's English original ("Saarikoski's Spirits"). Helsinki: Avain, 2007.
- The Last Days of Maiju Lassila. Austin: Atmosphere, 2022.
- Insecticide: A Republican Romance. Austin: Atmosphere, 2024.
- You-Gin One-Gin. Austin: Atmosphere, 2026.

==== Dictionary ====
- With Ilkka Rekiaro: Suomi/englanti/suomi-sanakirja (Finnish-English-Finnish Dictionary). Jyväskylä: Gummerus, 1989–present.

==== Blogs ====
- Mullah Billdoug, 2004–2005
- Red State Rah Rah, 2004
