= Aleksis Kivi =

National writer of Finland (1834–1872)

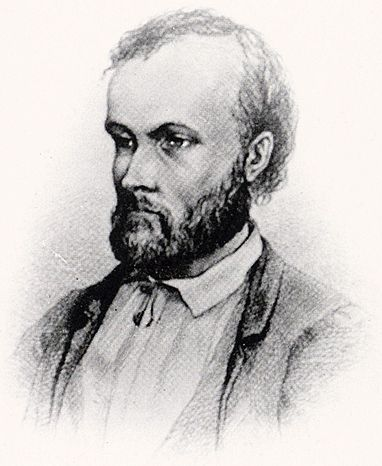
- Earliest known image of Kivi, almost certainly by Albert Edelfelt (1873)
- Born: Alexis Stenvall; 10 October 1834; Palojoki, Nurmijärvi, Grand Duchy of Finland, Russian Empire
- Died: 31 December 1872 (aged 38); Tuusula, Grand Duchy of Finland, Russian Empire
- Notable work: Seitsemän veljestä (Seven Brothers); Nummisuutarit (Heath Cobblers)

Aleksis Kivi (Finnish pronunciation: [ˈɑleksis ˈkiʋi]; born Alexis Stenvall; 10 October 1834 – 31 December 1872) was a Finnish writer who wrote the first significant novel in the Finnish language, Seitsemän veljestä (Seven Brothers), published in 1870. He is also known for his 1864 play, Nummisuutarit (Heath Cobblers).

Although Kivi was among the very earliest writers of prose and lyrics in Finnish, he is still considered one of the greatest, who has compared to "the Finnish equivalent of Goethe, Dickens and Twain" by the English translator Douglas Robinson. Kivi is regarded as the national writer of Finland and his birthday, 10 October, is celebrated as Finnish Literature Day.

== Life ==
Aleksis Stenvall was born in Palojoki village, Nurmijärvi, Grand Duchy of Finland. His parents were the village tailor Erik Johan Stenvall (1798–1866) and Anna-Kristiina Hamberg (1793–1863). Aleksis had three older brothers – Johannes, Emanuel, and Albert – and a younger sister, Agnes, who died in 1851 at the age of 13. Kivi's great-uncle Matts Stenvall was a member of the infamous "Nurmijärvi robbers".

In 1846, Kivi left for school in Helsinki. In 1859, he was accepted into the University of Helsinki, where he studied literature and developed an interest in the theatre. His first play was Kullervo (1860), based on a tragic tale from the Kalevala, Finland's national epic. He also met the famous journalist and statesman Johan Vilhelm Snellman who became his supporter.

During his time at school Kivi read world literature from the library of his landlord, and during his university studies, he saw plays by Molière and Schiller at the Swedish Theatre in Helsinki. Kivi also became friends with Fredrik Cygnaeus and Elias Lönnrot.

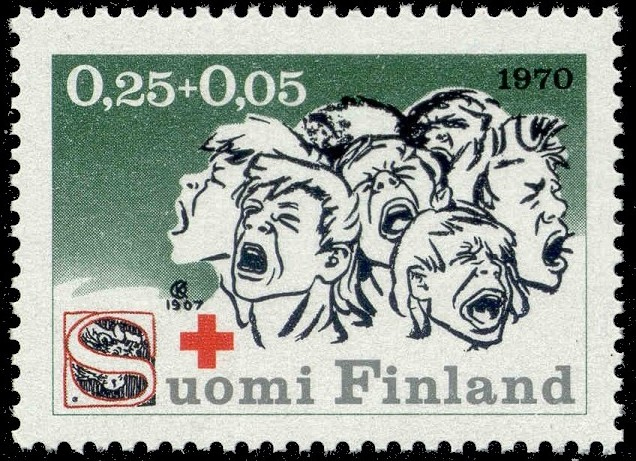
The unruly Seven Brothers on a 1970 Finnish postage stamp

From 1863 onwards, Kivi devoted his time to writing. He wrote twelve plays and a collection of poetry. The novel Seitsemän veljestä (Seven Brothers) took him ten years to write. Literary critics, especially the prominent August Ahlqvist, disapproved of the book, at least nominally because of its "rudeness" (Romanticism was at its height at the time). Ahlqvist also wrote "It is a ridiculous work and a blot on the name of Finnish literature". In a review published in Finlands Allmänna Tidning, Ahlqvist wrote that "the brothers' characters were nothing like calm, serious and laborious folk who toiled the Finnish lands." It is known that no other critic hated Kivi's writings as much as Ahlqvist, in which case the situation could almost be called "persecution", but the Fennomans also disapproved of Kivi's not-so-virtuous depictions of rural life, which were far from their idealized point of view, and Kivi's excessive drinking may have alienated some.

In 1865, Kivi won the State Prize for his still often performed comedy Nummisuutarit (Heath Cobblers). However, the less-than-enthusiastic reception of his books was taking its toll and he was already drinking heavily. His main benefactor Charlotta Lönnqvist, with whom Kivi lived in Fanjunkars Croft in Siuntio at the time of his creative writing, could not help him after the 1860s.

By 1870, while he was living at Franzén's cottage in Tapanila, Helsinki, Kivi's health collapsed. Assailed by typhoid and attacks of delirium, he was hospitalised. His doctor diagnosed melancholia due to his "injured dignity as a writer". The psychiatrist Kalle Achté concludes, based on a documentary survey, that Kivi was suffering from schizophrenia, although advanced borreliosis has also been suggested.

Kivi died in poverty in 1872 (aged 38) in Tuusula, at the home of his brother Albert. According to legend, his last words were, "I live" (Finnish: "Minä elän").

== Tribute ==
In the early 20th century, young writers Volter Kilpi and Eino Leino raised Kivi to the status of national icon. Eino Leino – and later Väinö Linna and Veijo Meri – also identified with Kivi's fate as an author.

In 1936, the Aleksis Kivi Prize, awarded for contributions to Finnish literature, was established.

In 1939, the Aleksis Kivi Memorial, a bronze statue of Kivi by Wäinö Aaltonen, was erected in front of the Finnish National Theatre. Many streets in Finnish cities and towns have also been named after Kivi, such as Aleksis Kiven katu in Tampere.

In 1941, the Aleksis Kivi Society was founded.

From 1995 to 1996, Finnish composer Einojuhani Rautavaara wrote an opera about Kivi's life and works. Two films have also been made: I Live (Finnish title: Minä elän) from 1946, directed by Ilmari Unho; and The Life of Aleksis Kivi (Finnish title: Aleksis Kiven elämä) from 2002, written and directed by Jari Halonen.

== Works ==
=== Plays ===
- Kullervo
- Lea
- Heath Cobblers (Nummisuutarit, 1864)
- Karkurit
- Kihlaus
- Olviretki Schleusingenissa
- Yö ja päivä
- Leo ja Liina
- Canzio
- Alma
- Margareta
- Selman juonet

=== Other ===
- Koto ja kahleet (story)
- Eriika (story)
- Vuoripeikot (story)
- Kanervala (poetry collection)
- Seitsemän veljestä (1870, novel)
- Runot, lyhyet kertomukset (poetry collection)
- Aleksis Kiven tarinoita (stories)

== Gallery ==
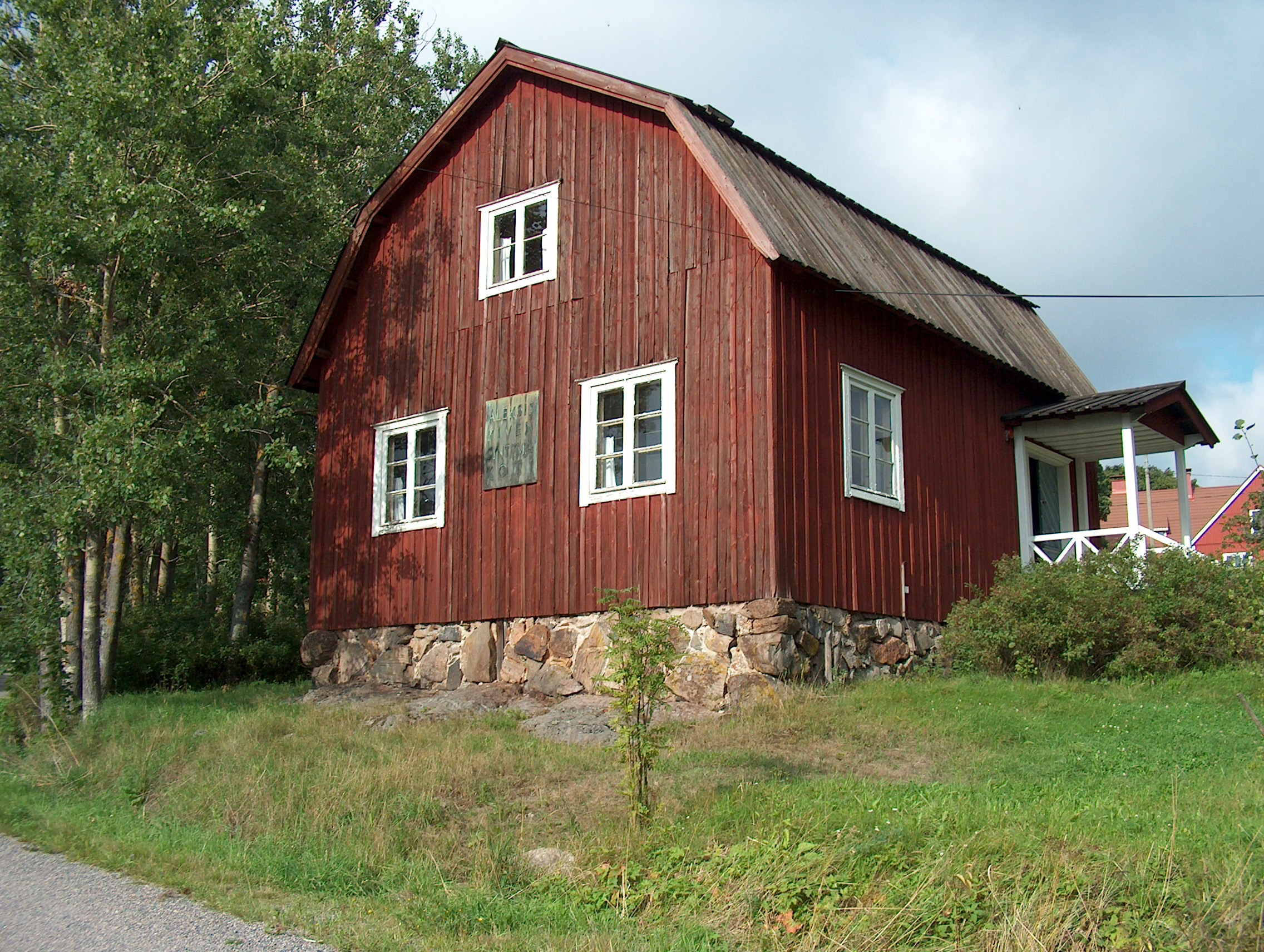
Home where Aleksis Kivi was born

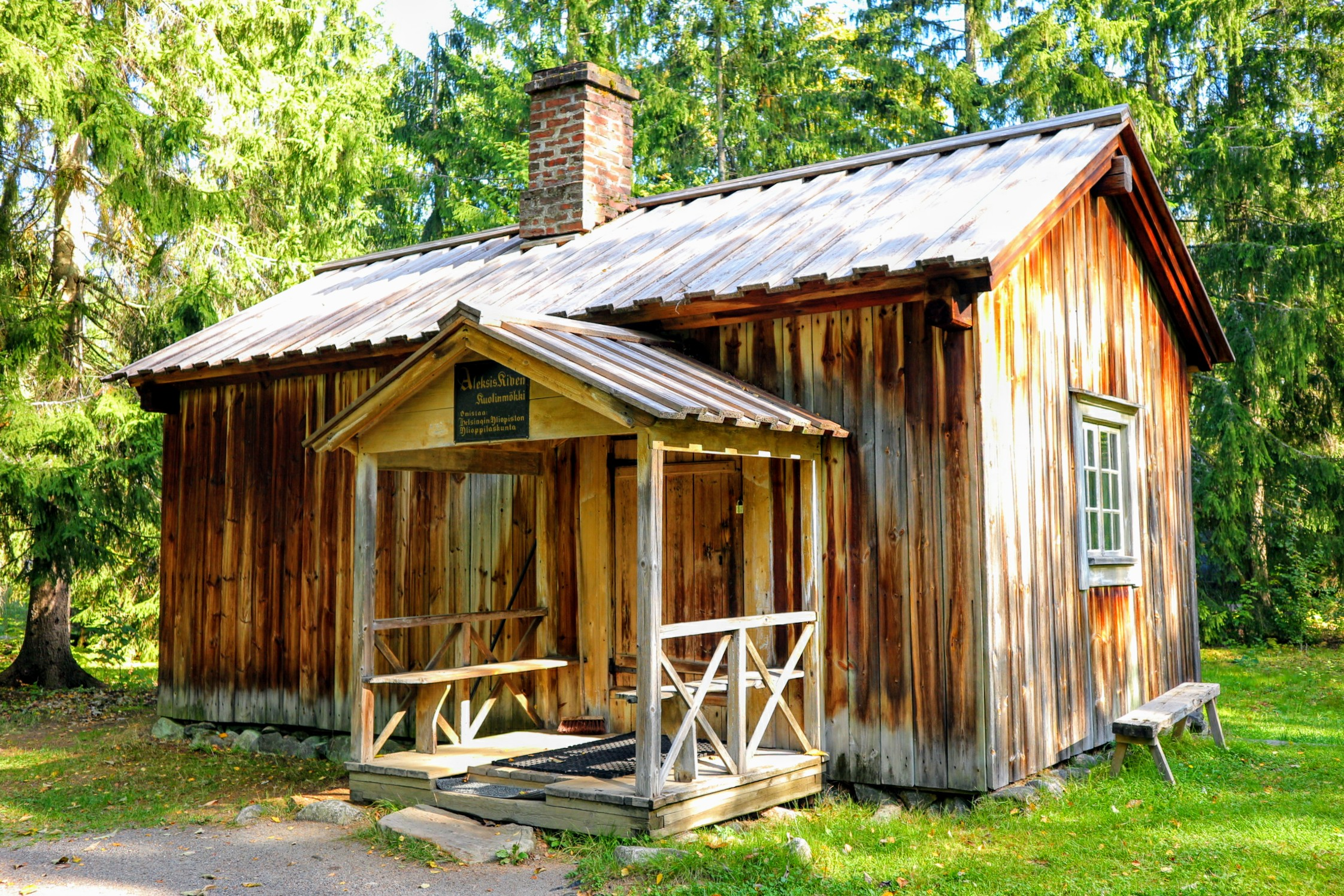
House where Aleksis Kivi died

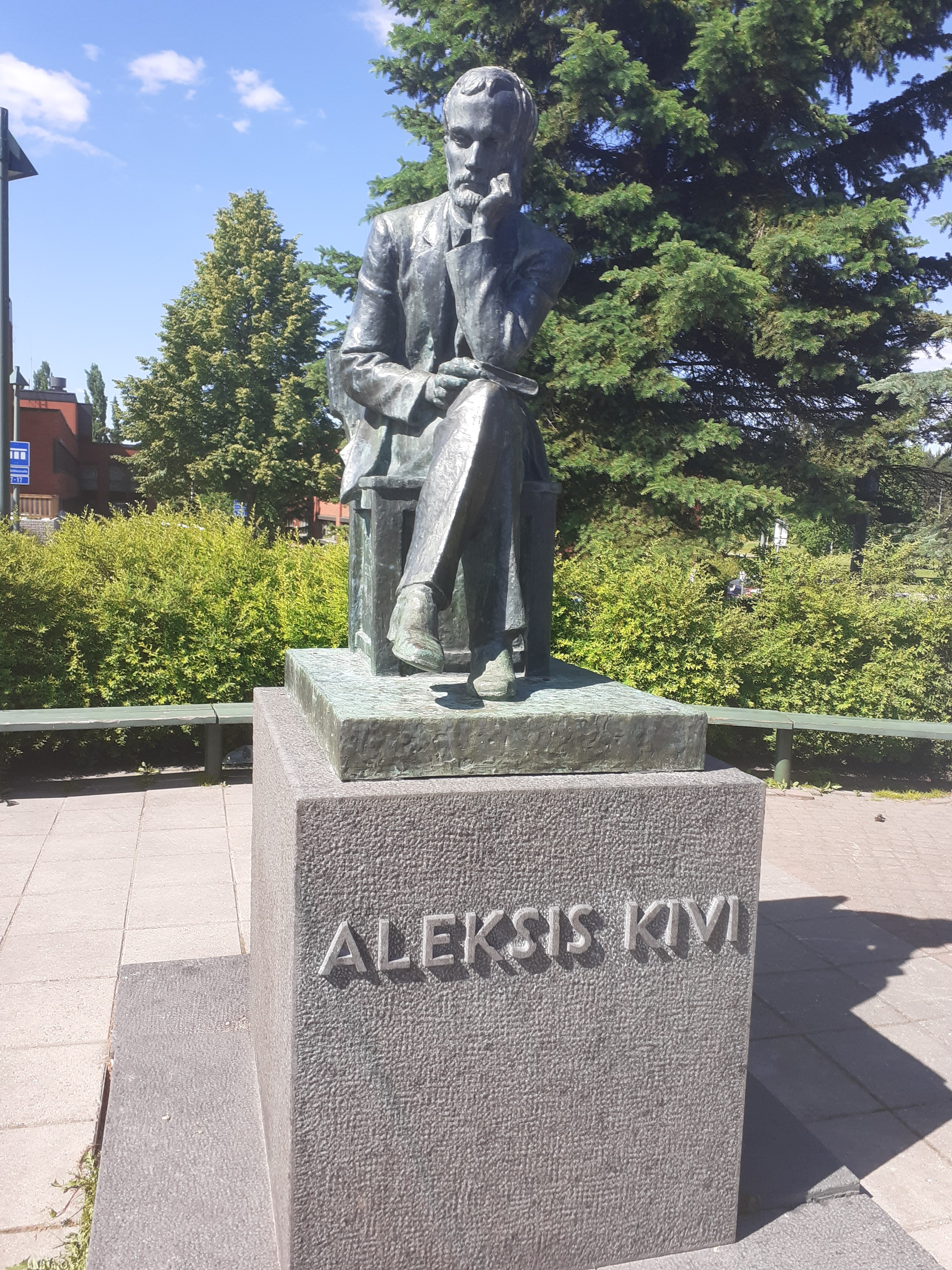
Aleksis Kivi's statue in Nurmijärvi

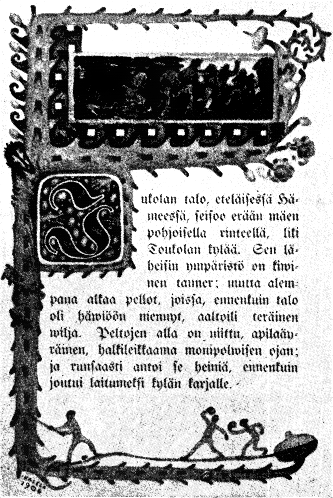
Cover from an early version of "Seitsemän veljestä"

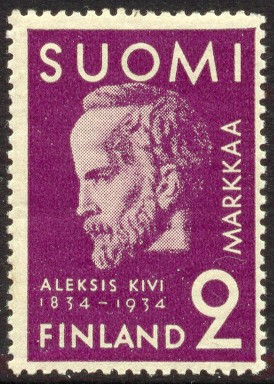
1934 postage stamp commemorating Kivi, by Germund Paaer, after a sculpture by Wäinö Aaltonen

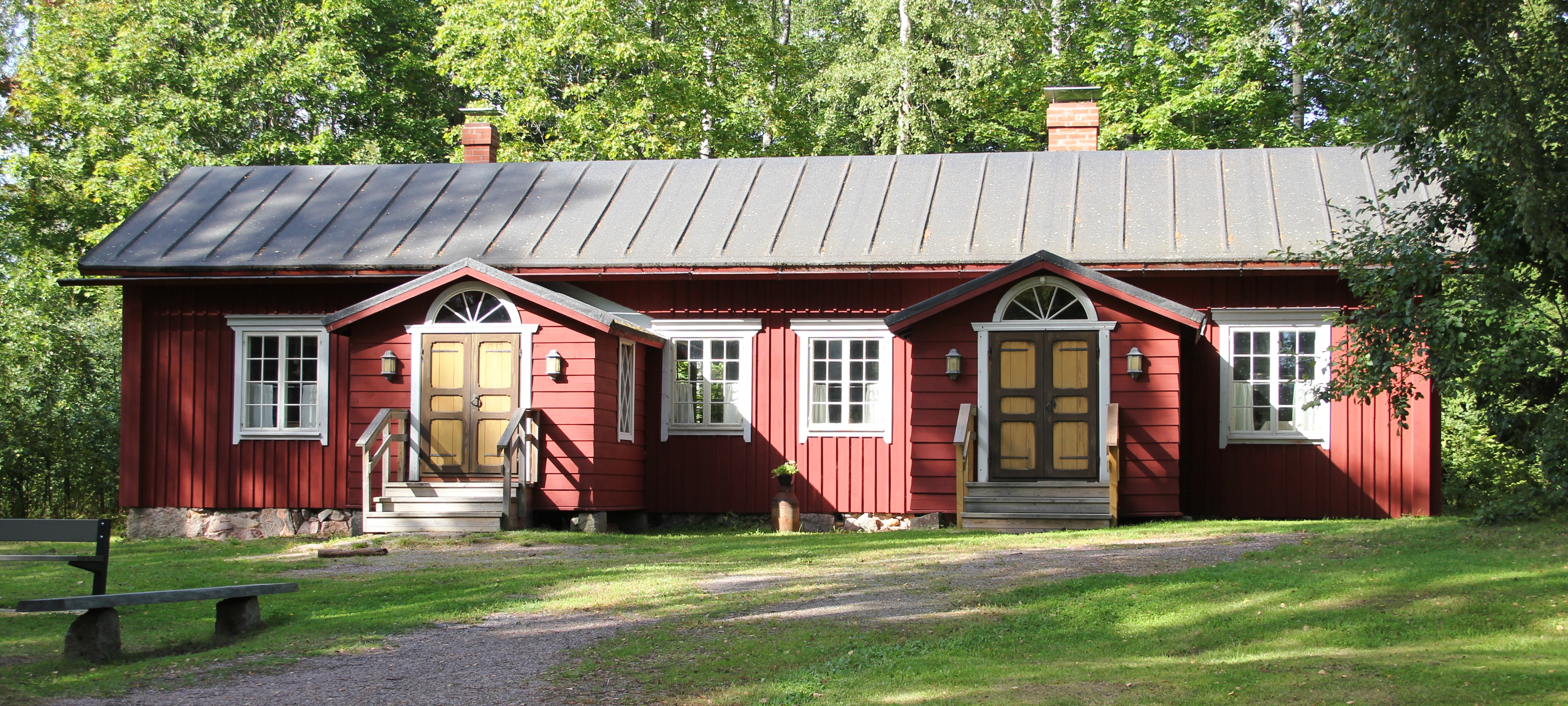
Fanjunkars Croft in Siuntio

== See also ==
- Finnish literature
- Juhani Aho

== Kivi in English ==
- Impola, Richard A., trans. Aleksis Kivi, Seven Brothers (English translation of Seitsemän veljestä). New Paltz, NY: Finnish-American Translators Association, 1991.
- Matson, Alex, trans. Aleksis Kivi, Seven Brothers (English translation of Seitsemän veljestä). 1st edition, New York: Coward-McCann, 1929. 2nd edition, Helsinki: Tammi, 1952. 3rd edition, edited by Irma Rantavaara, Helsinki: Tammi, 1973.
- Robinson, Douglas, trans. Aleksis Kivi's Heath Cobblers and Kullervo. St. Cloud, MN: North Star Press of St. Cloud, 1993.
- Robinson, Douglas, trans. The Brothers Seven. Bucharest, Romania: Zeta Books, 2017

== Secondary sources ==
- Robinson, Douglas, Aleksis Kivi and/as World Literature. Leiden and Boston: Brill, 2017.
- Tarkiainen, Viljo, Aleksis Kivi: elämä ja teokset. WSOY, 1950.
