= Elina Hirvonen =

Finnish journalist (born 1975)

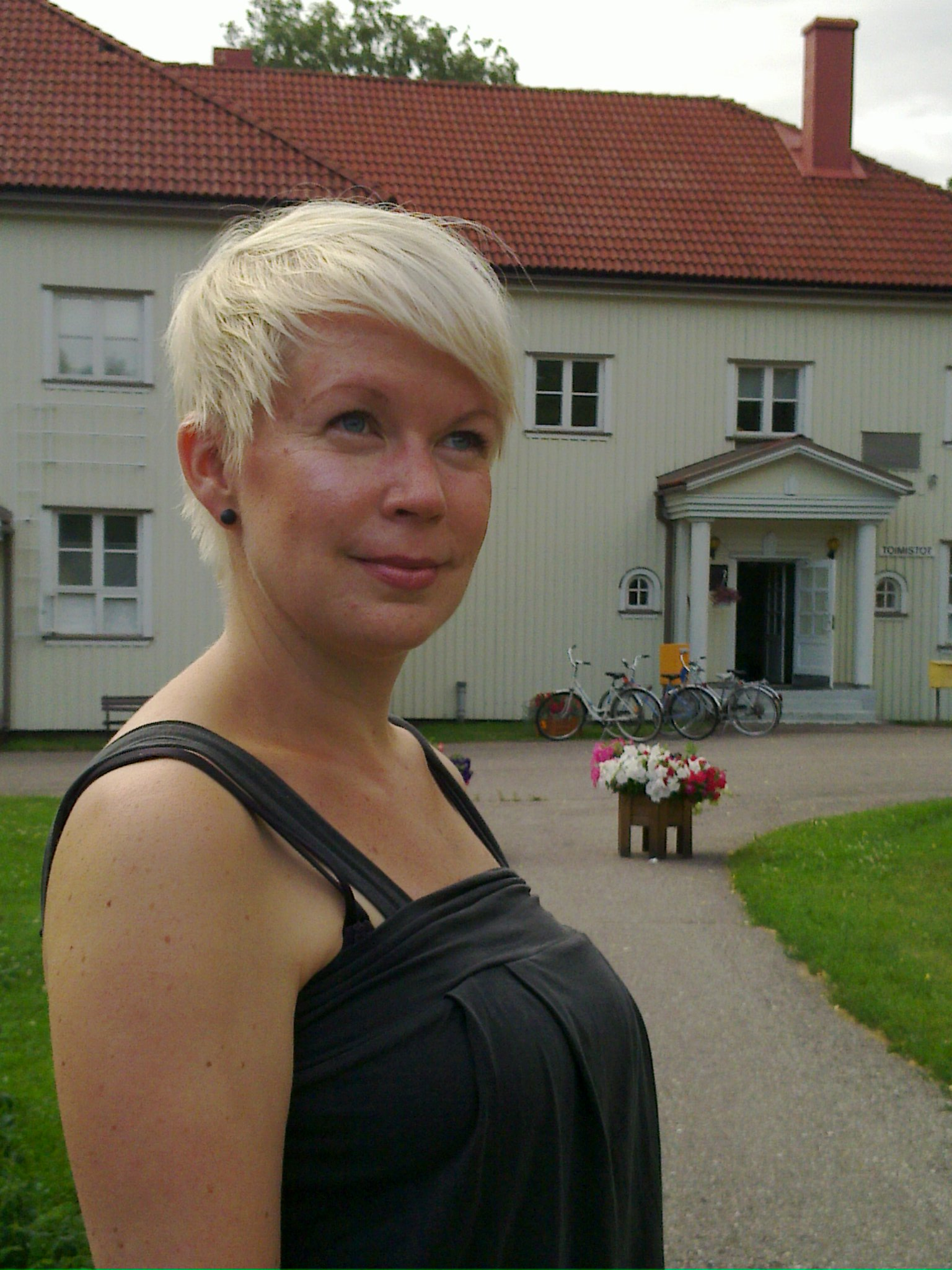
Elina Hirvonen in 2011.

Elina Hirvonen (born 1975, Helsinki) is a Finnish writer, journalist and documentary film-maker. She was educated at the Helsinki University of Art and Design, and also the University of Turku, where she studied literature in the Faculty of Humanities.

Hirvonen's first novel Että hän muistaisi saman (When I Forgot) was first published in Finland in 2005. It was shortlisted for the Finlandia Prize. In 2006 an Italian translation was published (Ricordati) by an independent publishing company (Scritturapura Editore). An English translation by Douglas Robinson was published by Portobello Books in November 2007, with an American edition by Tin House Books in May 2009.

Hirvonen's second novel, Kauimpana kuolemasta, was published in 2010. She wrote the novel in Lusaka, Zambia, where she lived for two years with her husband.

Her first documentary feature film, Paradise: Three journeys in this world, is about migration from Africa to Europe. It premiered in Helsinki in 2007. This film also won the first prize in the category 'medium length films' of the Rhodes ecofilms and video arts festival in June 2008.
