= Nurmijärvi robbers =

19th-century criminal gang operating in Southern Finland

The Nurmijärvi robbers (Nurmijärven rosvot) were a criminal gang operating in Southern Häme and Uusimaa between 1820 and 1822, with the Nurmijärvi parish as their main base. The core of the gang originally consisted of thirteen men, six of whom were from Nurmijärvi. The gang was led by Mikko Södergård, who was from Lepsämä in Nurmijärvi, and Heikki Krig (born Henrik Hjorth), who was from Häme. The bandits began their activities in 1820 with pickpocketing and theft, but in the later stages they were already committing robberies and murders.

Only when the robbers' activities had become more brutal and the nobility also began to fall victim to them did the authorities take action. About 700 Russian Cossacks and soldiers were brought to the Nurmijärvi region, with the help of whom the robbers were arrested at the turn of the year 1822–1823. The sentences received by the Nurmijärvi robbers ranged from the death penalty to birching and forced labor. However, only a few of the robbers' more than one hundred accused accomplices were sentenced to punishment. The aftermath of the robbers' trials also included a bloody prison uprising they organized in Hämeenlinna's prison in 1824.

Matti Stenvall, the great-uncle of writer Aleksis Kivi, was one of the Nurmijärvi robbers; in 1874, Julius Krohn suggested in Suomen Kuvalehti that the robbers were the real-life models for the Jukola brothers in the 1872 novel The Seven Brothers by Kivi. In 2019, the play Rosvot ("Robbers"), which is based on true events, was performed at Taaborinvuori.

== Sources ==
=== Further reading ===
- Ylikangas, Heikki (2003). Nurmijärven rosvot. Maankuulun rikollissakin nousu ja tuho 1820-luvun Suomessa (in Finnish). WSOY. ISBN 951-0-28341-X.
- Vainio, V. I. (1934). Nurmijärven rosvot - Muistelmia Hyvinkään kauppalanseudun menneisyydestä (in Finnish). Hyvinkään Kirjapaino.
- "Nurmijärvi rövare", Huvudstadsbladet, 1874. (in Swedish)
