= Gustav Wiklund =

Finnish actor (1934–2019)

- Born: 26 June 1934; Helsinki, Finland
- Died: 27 August 2019 (aged 85)
- Education: Svenska Teaterns elevskola
- Occupation: Actor
- Years active: 1958–2019
- Employer(s): Lilla Teatern (1960–1979); Svenska Teatern (1979–1990)

Notes
- Also painter

Gustav Adolf Fingal Wiklund (26 June 1934 – 27 August 2019) was a Finnish actor. He has appeared both in theatrical and film roles, in Swedish and Finnish language. He was born in Helsinki. He worked at the Lilla Teatern in Helsinki in 1960–1979 and at the Svenska Teatern in 1979–1990, especially noted for his roles in musical revues. He also presented his paintings at exhibitions.

== Partial filmography ==
- Tie pimeään (1962) – Radio Shop Salesman
- Takiaispallo (1970) – Insurance inspector Erik Kaartinen
- Haluan rakastaa, Peter (1972) – Anders Jansson
- Hemåt i natten (1977) – Kurt Yläranta
- Aika hyvä ihmiseksi (1977) – Poliisimestari
- Män kan inte våldtas (1978) – Janitor
- Poet and Muse (1978) – Doctor
- Slumrande toner (1978)
- Risto Vanarin piilokamera (1979) – Brawling man
- Natalia (1979) – Conductor
- Mördare! Mördare! (1980, TV Movie) – Polis
- Barna från Blåsjöfjället (1980) – Scout
- Operation Leo (1981) – Taxichaufför
- Kuningas jolla ei ollut sydäntä (1982) – Lääkäri
- Sista Leken (1984) – Läkare
- Nattseilere (1986) – Priest
- Petos (1988) – Conductor
- Drakarna över Helsingfors (2001) – Avdelningschef
- The Life of Aleksis Kivi (2001) – J.V. Snellman
- Raid (2003) – Heinrichs
- Populärmusik från Vittula (Popular Music From Vittula, 2004) – Ryssi-Jussi
- Äideistä parhain (2005) – Pappi
- Tali-Ihantala 1944 (2007) – (voice)
- Där vi en gång gått (2011) – Wrede
