= Mia Kankimäki =

Finnish writer and author

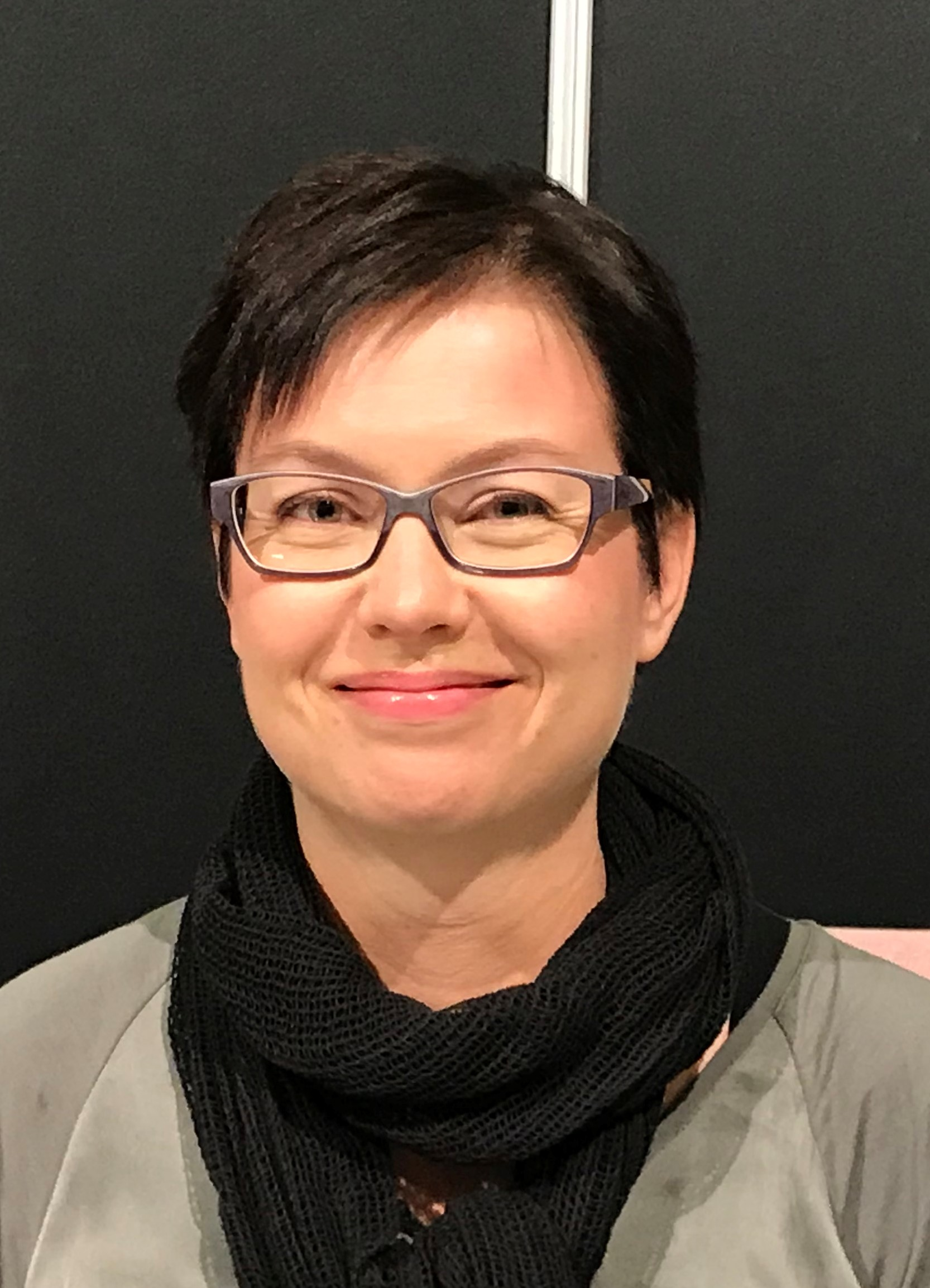
Kankimäki in 2018

Mia Kankimäki (born 1971 in Helsinki) is a Finnish writer, and author of two non-fiction books, which blend travelogue, memoir, biography and women's history. Her second book The Women I Think About At Night was published in the US by Simon & Schuster in 2020.

== Biography ==
Kankimäki has a master's degree in comparative literature from the University of Helsinki, and she has worked as a copywriter and editor at various publishing houses. Japanese culture is her special interest, and she's qualified as a teacher of Japanese flower arranging of Sogetsu Ikebana school.

In 2010, she left her job and traveled to Japan on the trail of Sei Shōnagon, a lady-in-waiting and author who lived in Kyoto a thousand years ago. The book about this journey, Asioita jotka saavat sydämen lyömään nopeammin (Things That Make One's Heart Beat Faster) was published in 2013 by Otava. It was awarded with Helmet Award 2015 given by Helsinki libraries to "a future classic", and selected as the Best Travel Book of the year 2013. It has been translated to Estonian and Italian, and will be published in Japanese and German as well.

Her second book, Naiset joita ajattelen öisin, published in 2018, was inspired by her travels in the footsteps of female figures in Tanzania, Kenya, Italy, and Japan. It was published as The Women I Think About At Night in the US in 2020, translated by Douglas Robinson. Translation rights of the book have been sold to 15 territories to date, and it has already been published in Czech, Estonian, Norwegian, Latvian, Polish and Russian.

Kankimäki lives in Helsinki, Finland.

== Awards and honours ==
- Otava Book Foundation's non fiction award, 2020
- Honorary Award by Lauri Jäntti Foundation's Non Fiction Prize, 2019
- Nomination for Finnish Literary Export Prize, 2019
- Nomination for Great Journalist Prize, 2019
- Helmet Award, 2015
- Best Travel Book of the year 2013 (by Mondo magazine)
- Nomination for Kanava Award for non fiction, 2013

== Publications ==
- Asioita jotka saavat sydämen lyömään nopeammin, 2013. ISBN 978-951-1-27250-2 (Finnish), ISBN 978-9985-3-4297-8 (Estonian), ISBN 978-88-566-4061-8 (Italian)
- Naiset joita ajattelen öisin (The Women I Think About at Night), 2018. ISBN 978-951-1-30339-8 (Finnish), ISBN 978-1-9821-2919-4 (English), ISBN 978-9985-3-4297-8 (Estonian), ISBN 978-5-04-105058-0 (Russian), ISBN 978-80-267-1753-9 (Czech), ISBN 978-82-93311-68-3 (Norwegian), ISBN 978-9934-0-8821-6 (Latvian)
