= Kalle Achté =

Finnish psychiatrist (1928–2019)

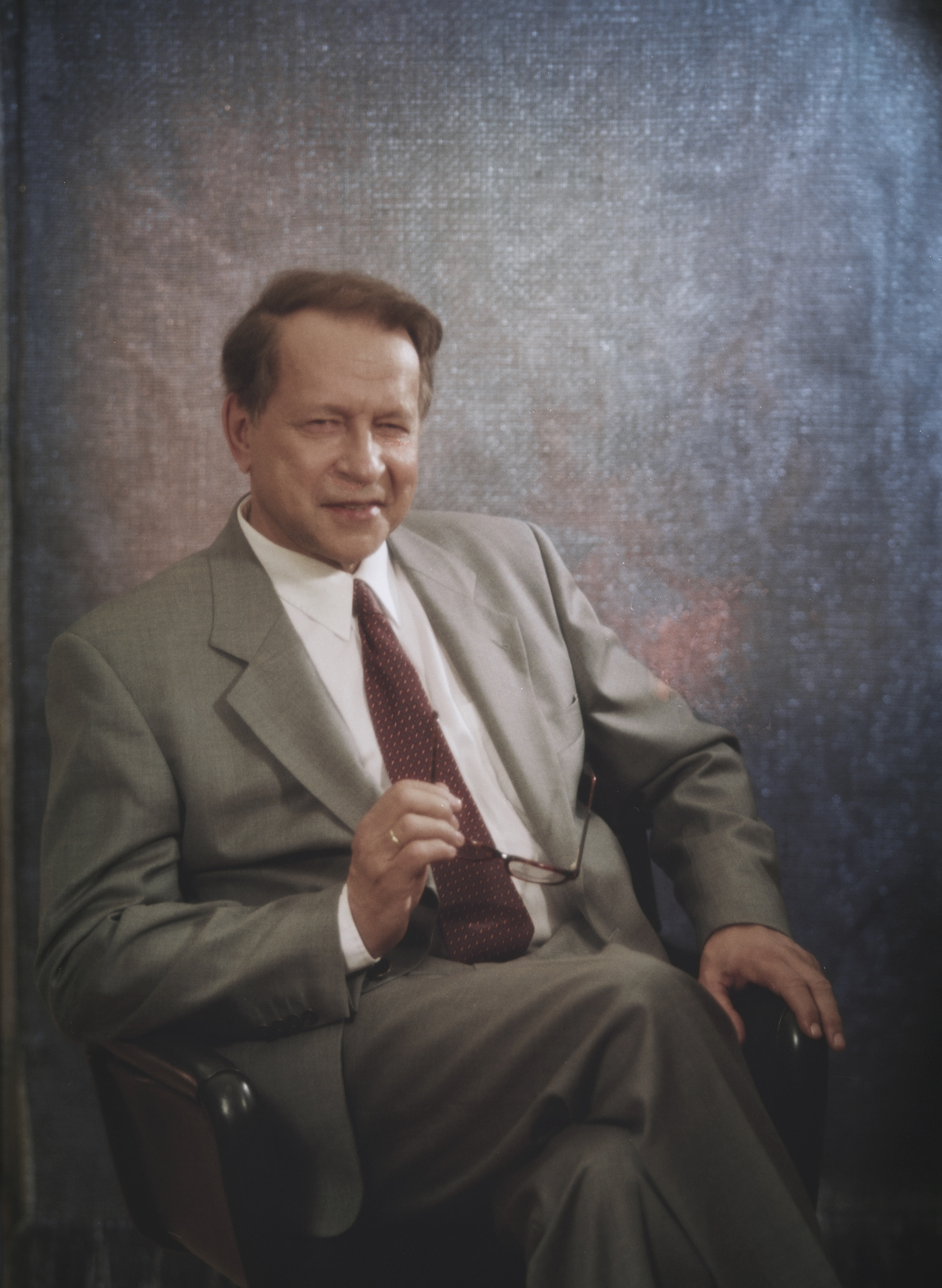
Kalle Achté, 1994.

Karl Aimo "Kalle" Achté (12 September 1928 – 30 January 2019) was a Finnish psychiatrist.

He was a physician and psychiatrist at Helsinki University Central Hospital from 1956 to 1961 and Hesperia Hospital 1961 to 1966, taking his doctoral degree in 1961. From 1968 to 1991 he was a professor of psychiatry at the University of Helsinki and concurrently chief physician at the Helsinki University Central Hospital. He also served as dean of the Faculty of Medicine from 1978 to 1981. He was a member of the Norwegian Academy of Science and Letters from 1989.

He died in 2019.
