= Leroy Searle =

American poet

Leroy Searle is a distinguished professor of English and comparative literature at University of Washington, author, musician, and poet. His lifelong areas of study are American literature, history and theory of criticism, modernism, European and comparative romanticism, music arrangement and performance, photography, intellectual history and philosophy, and computer science. Specifically, Searle explores, and has published works on, philosophers such as Aristotle, Plato, Samuel Taylor Coleridge, Kant, and Charles Sanders Peirce. He also specializes in notable American authors such as Henry James, William Carlos Williams, William Faulkner, and Walt Whitman.

In 2007, Searle was named the first Hanauer Honors professor. In this University of Washington Honors Program founded by Northwest Businessman Joff Hanauer, Searle teaches an annual class on topics related to Western Intellectual History. In addition, he is actively involved in the Honors Program, which includes serving on the Honors Faculty Council.

Searle was the founding director of the UW Humanities and Arts Computer Center, the former director of the Walter Chapin Simpson Humanities Center, and the director of the College Studies Program. He is one of the founding faculty members of the Program in Criticism and Theory, Comparative History of Ideas Program, and the Textual Studies Program. He has extensively served as the Graduate Program Coordinator in Comparative Literature. He served for three decades on the UW Intellectual Property Management Advisory Committee, and as chair in the year before the committee's function was integrated into UW Co-Motion. Searle's current project is the establishment of the "Tautegory Institute," for the development of cross disciplinary conversations, critical reading, and research.

Searle received his bachelor's degree in English at Utah State University in 1965. Five years later, he acquired a master's (1968) and Ph.D. degree (1970) in English at the University of Iowa.

== Current works in progress ==
- "Plato, Aristotle, and the Poets"
- "Visible Intelligence: Essays on Photography, Theory and Criticism"
- "Imaginative Reason: Essays in Philosophical Criticism"

== Partial bibliography ==
- Radical, Rational, Space, Time: Idea Networks in Photography (1983)
- Critical Theory since 1965 (1985)
- Conceptual Structures: Fulfilling Peirce's Dream; Fifth International Conference on Conceptual Structures (1997)
- Concerning the Power of the Preposition: The Photographs of Nathan Lyons (2004)
- Technology and the Perils of Poetry; or Why Criticism Never Catches Up (2004)
- Voice, Text, Hypertext: Emerging Practices in Textual Studies (2004)
- Critical Theory Since Plato (coedited with Hazard Adams) (2005)
- Textual Authority, Textual Integrity: The Cultural Importance of Editorial Ethics (2006)
- Literature Departments and the Practice of Theory (2006)
- From Inference to Insight: a Peircean Model of Literary Reasoning (2008)
- Prospects for Theorizing, vol. 25 (2007), 37-79 (published 2009)
