= Fredrik Cygnaeus =

Finnish poet (1807–1881)

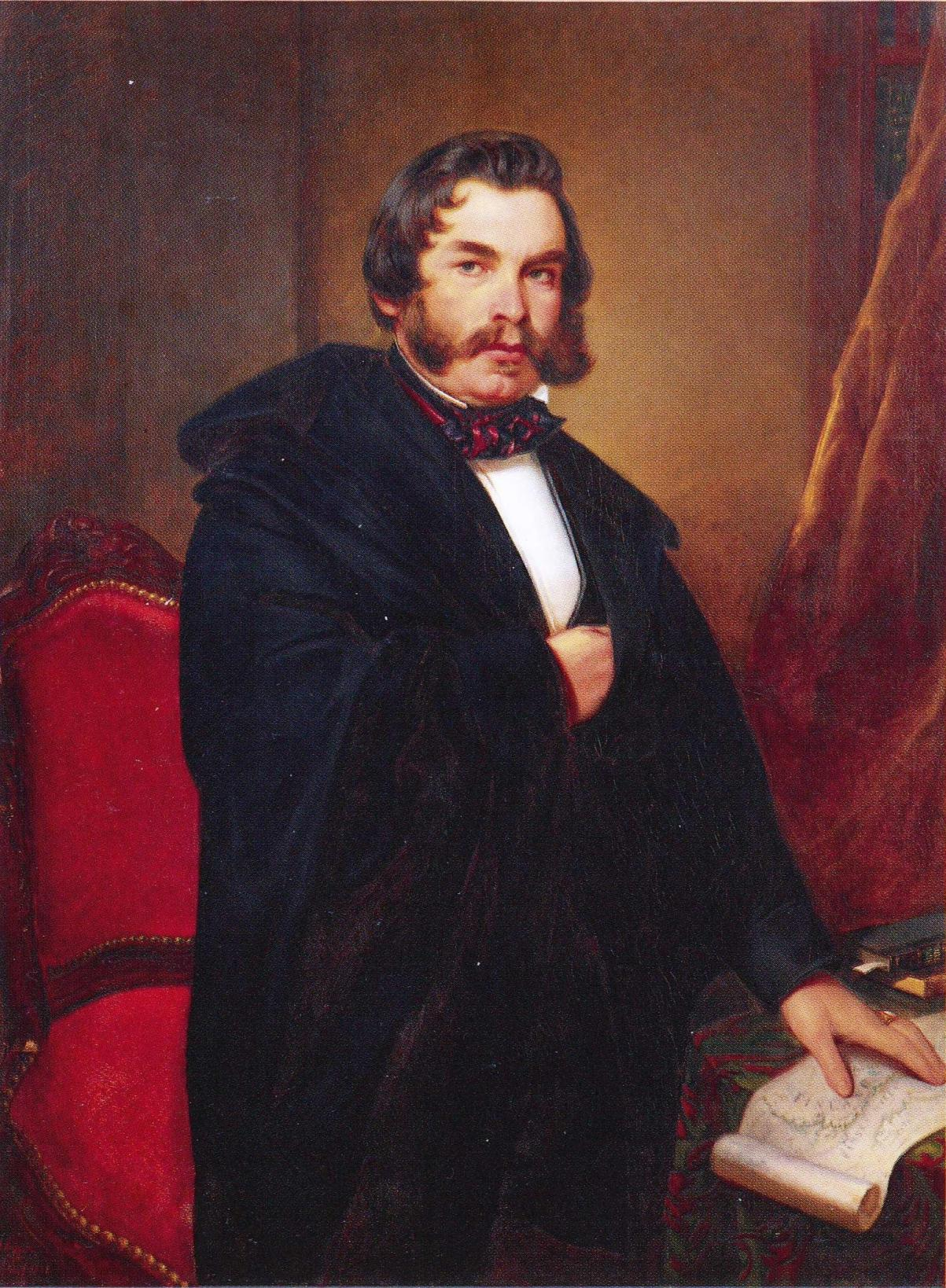
- Fredrik Cygnaeus by Erik Johan Löfgren
- Born: 1 April 1807; Hämeenlinna, Finland
- Died: 7 February 1881 (aged 73); Helsinki, Finland

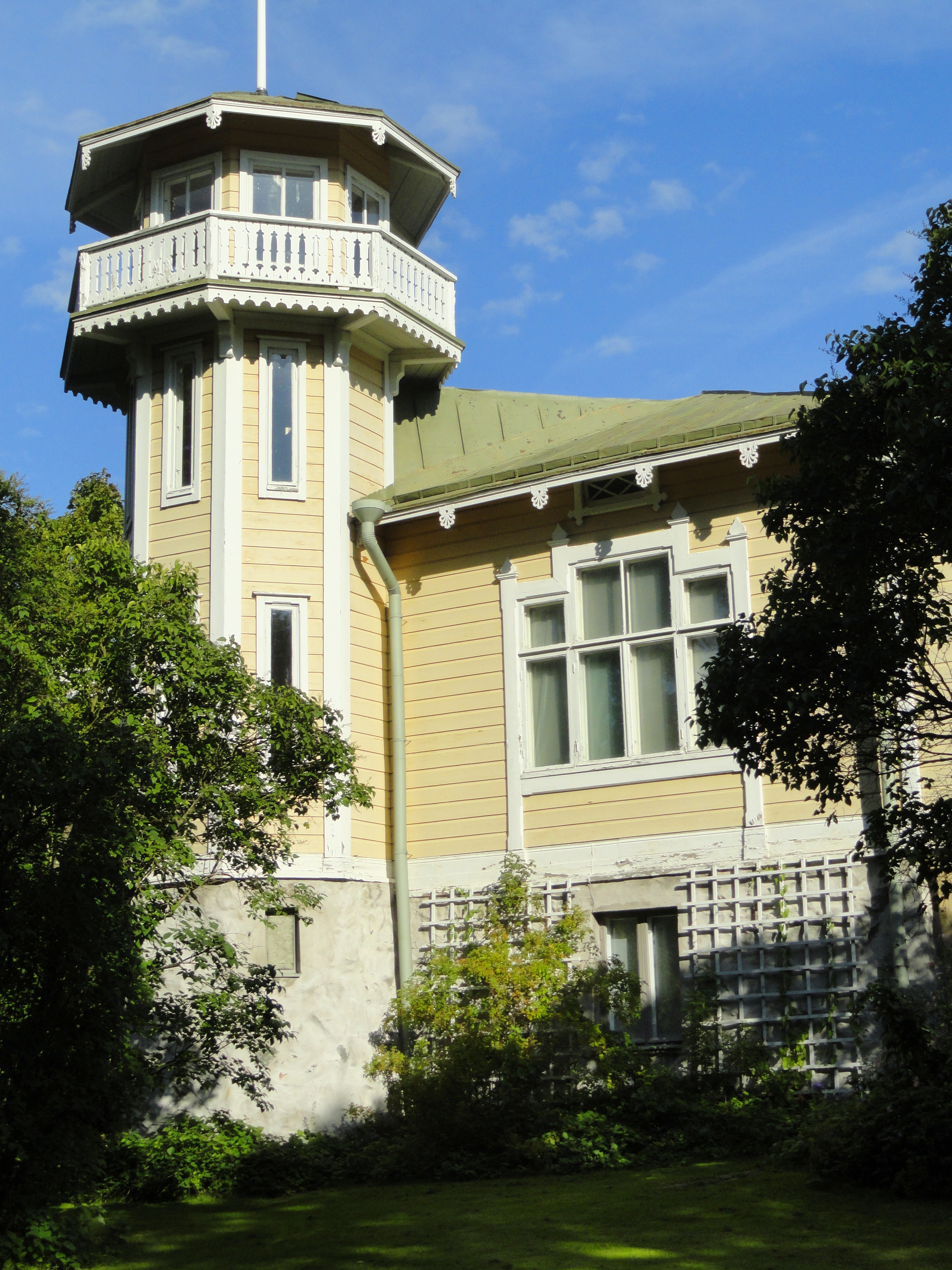
Cygnaeus Gallery in Helsinki

Fredrik Cygnaeus (1 April 1807 – 7 February 1881) was a Finnish poet, art critic and collector, docent of history and university professor of aesthetics and literature. Cygnaeus was an influential figure in Finnish art and literature, contributed to Finnish nationalism and was a central person in the Fennoman movement (Fennomani).

== Biography ==
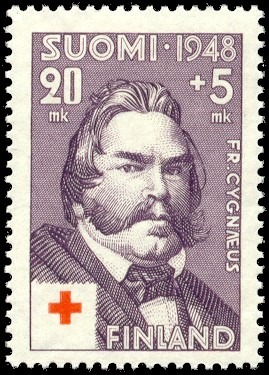
Fredrik Cygnaeus on a stamp in 1948

Cygnaeus was born at Hämeenlinna, Finland. He was the son of Zacharias Cygnaeus and Margareta Karolina Aejmelaeus. He was born in wealthy aristocratic family, his grandfather and father were both bishops, and his father was invited to St. Petersburg as a bishop for the Lutheran parishes. Fredrik Cygnaeus attended schools in St. Petersburg, learned foreign languages and received European influences. In 1823 he returned to Finland and attended Imperial Alexander University in Turku. He graduated as a Master of Philosophy in 1832 and taught in schools in Hamina (1833–1837) and Helsinki (1839–1843).

Cygnaeus traveled extensively in Europe 1843–1847 with support of a stipendium. His was planning to find documents of Swedish history in archives in France and Italy. He used the opportunity to network with Europeans, attend theatre and read literature. He also wrote poetry and newspaper articles from his travels.

After his return to Finland, Cygnaeus was an acting university professor of history between 1848 and 1853. At the university, he often acted as a link between university students and administration, to channel raising nationalism to peaceful expressions and avoid revolutions. The tradition of Flora day celebrations of university students was founded under his leadership by him on May 13, 1848. When students became more radical, they did not accept Cygnaeus as their curator any more, but the administration awarded him with a professorship in modern literature in 1854. He was appointed Dean of the Faculty of History and Linguistics from the beginning of 1856. In 1867 he retired as emeritus.

Cygnaeus served as chairman of the Finnish Literature Society 1863-1878. He considered himself most of all as a historian and a poet. For the later world, his contribution as supporter of arts and artists has been more significant. Cygnaeus was the first one who wrote analysis of central works of Johan Ludvig Runeberg (1804–1877). He also supported the works of authors Aleksis Kivi (1834–1872) and Zacharias Topelius (1818–1898).

== Cygnaeus Gallery ==
Cygnaeus had his summer residence in the Kaivopuisto neighbourhood in the centre of Helsinki. It was built as a villa in 1869-1870 to designs by architect J.F.W. Mieritz. Cygnaeus donated the villa to the Finnish nation in his testament. He had also gathered a remarkable collection of art and curiosities, which he also donated to people of Finland. The collection was presented in his villa now known as the Cygnaeus Gallery. The gallery contains ca. 200 works, mainly Finnish art from the 19th century. Cygnaeus Gallery is owned by the National Museum of Finland under the authority of the National Board of Antiquities.
