= Charlotta Lönnqvist =

Finnish cultural personality

Charlotta Maria Lönnqvist
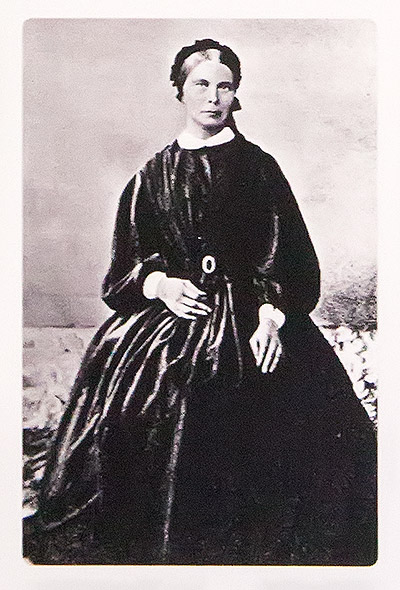
- Charlotta Lönnqvist
- Born: April 2, 1815; Siuntio, Grand Duchy of Finland
- Died: April 27, 1891 (aged 76); Siuntio, Grand Duchy of Finland
- Burial place: Siuntio Cemetery
- Known for: Patron of Aleksis Kivi
- Parents: Jonas Lönnqvist (father); Maria Lönnqvist (mother)

Charlotta Maria Lönnqvist (4 February 1815 Siuntio – 27 April 1891 Siuntio) was a Finnish, Swedish-speaking cultural personality. She is mainly known as the benefactor of Aleksis Kivi who lived in her cottage, Fanjukars, in 1864-1871. She was also a known wolfer, who was awarded a prize by the Finnish Hunting Association for her skills.

== Life ==
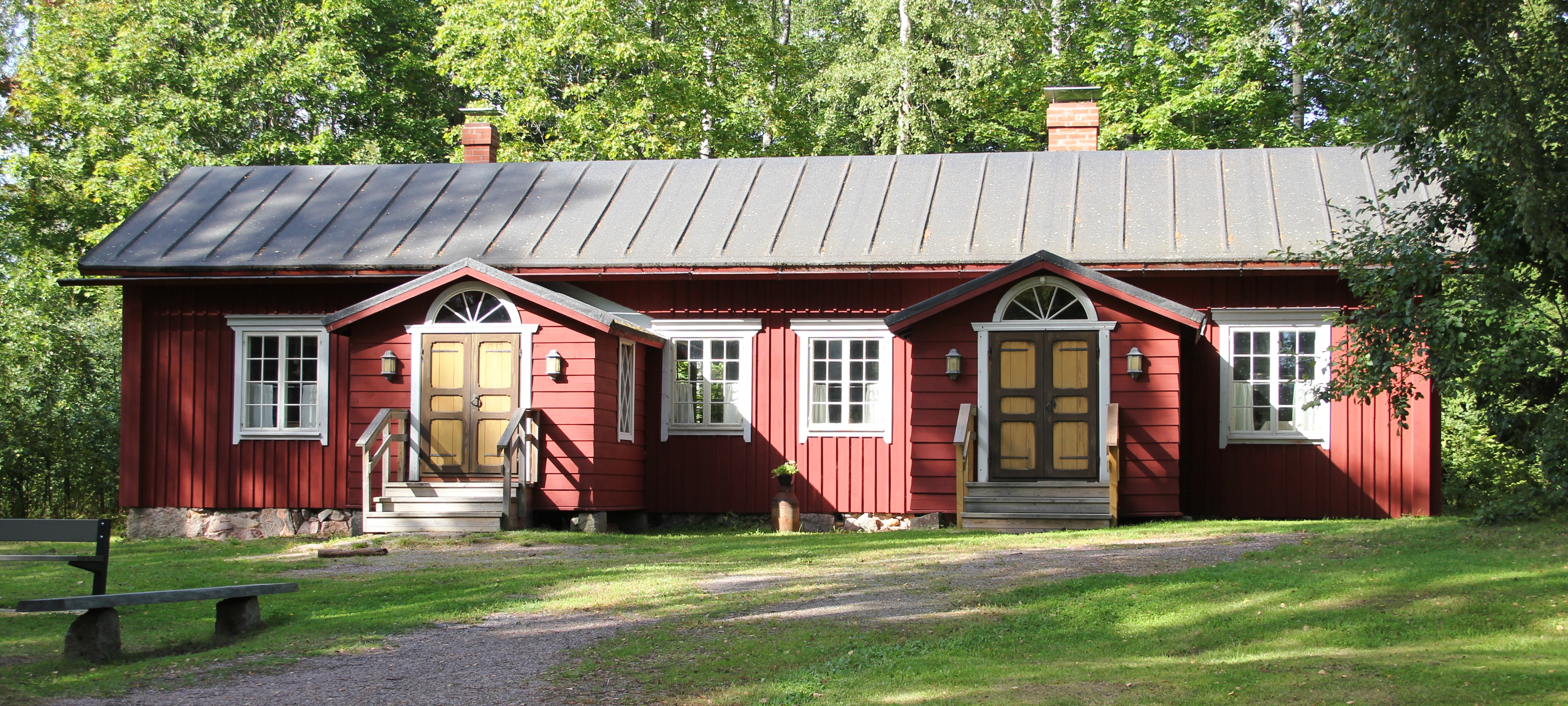
Fanjunkars croft.

Charlotta Lönnqvist was the daughter of the soldier Jonas Lönnqvist and Maria Forsström. She never married. After the death of her parents, she inherited her childhood cottage, Fanjunkars, originally called Bruses. Lönnqvist had a small saving capital and occasionally earned some money catering at weddings and funerals. In addition to catering, she even taught girls from larger manor houses how to take care of the household.

From 1864 to 1871, the National Author of Finland, Aleksis Kivi, lived with her. Kivi was not unfamiliar with Siuntio as he had lived there before at his brother's farm house in Purnus. It was regarded improper for a male to live alone with a female of the same class (in which neither was employed by the other), and this caused rumors that they were lovers. Kivi wrote major part of his whole production in Fanjunkars. For instance, Seven Brothers was written in Fanjunkars.

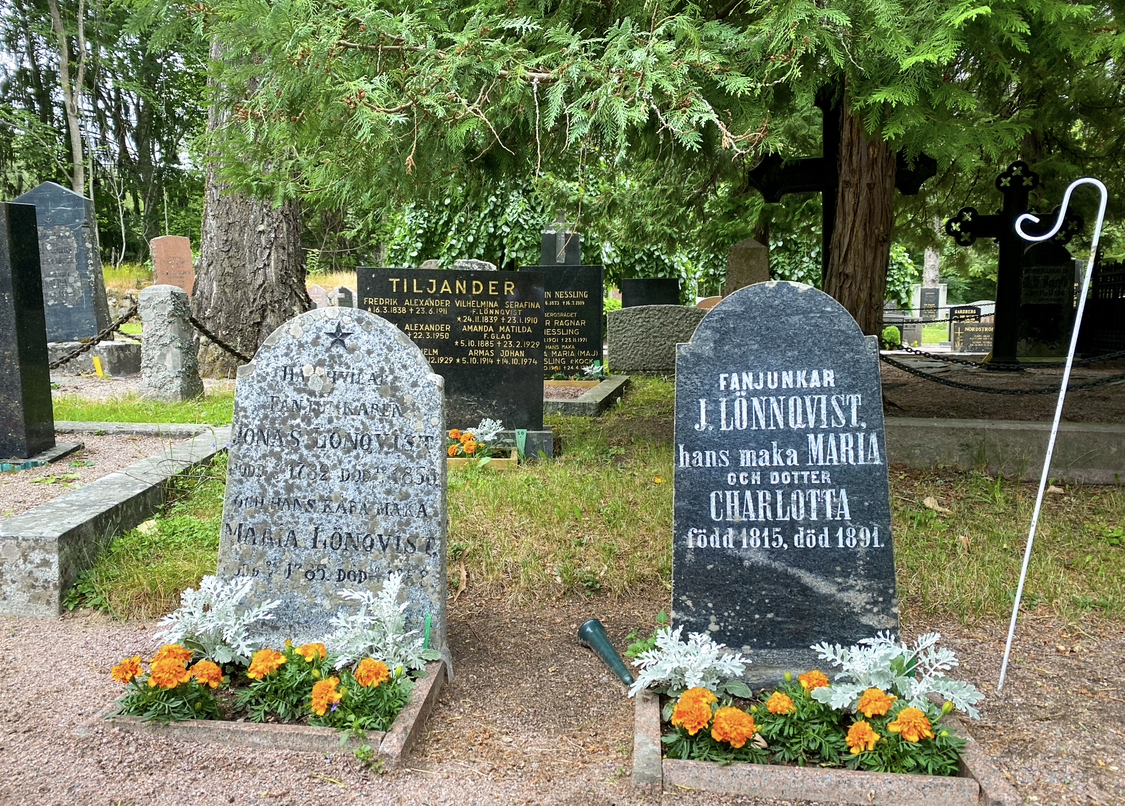
Charlotta Lönnqvist's grave at Siuntio cemetery.

Charlotta Lönnqvist participated in charity, and her relief work during the famine of 1866-1868 ruined her. Kivi therefore gave her an income from his writings in 1869. Lönnqvist died in Siuntio at the age of 76. She was buried in Siuntio cemetery, near St. Peter's Church, together with her parents.

== Legacy ==
Lönnqvist is celebrated in Siuntio with various memorials. Her house, Fanjunkars, was destroyed during the Soviet lease of the Porkkala Naval Base after the Second World War. In 2006, Fanjunkars was reconstructed in the municipal centre with financial support from the European Union.

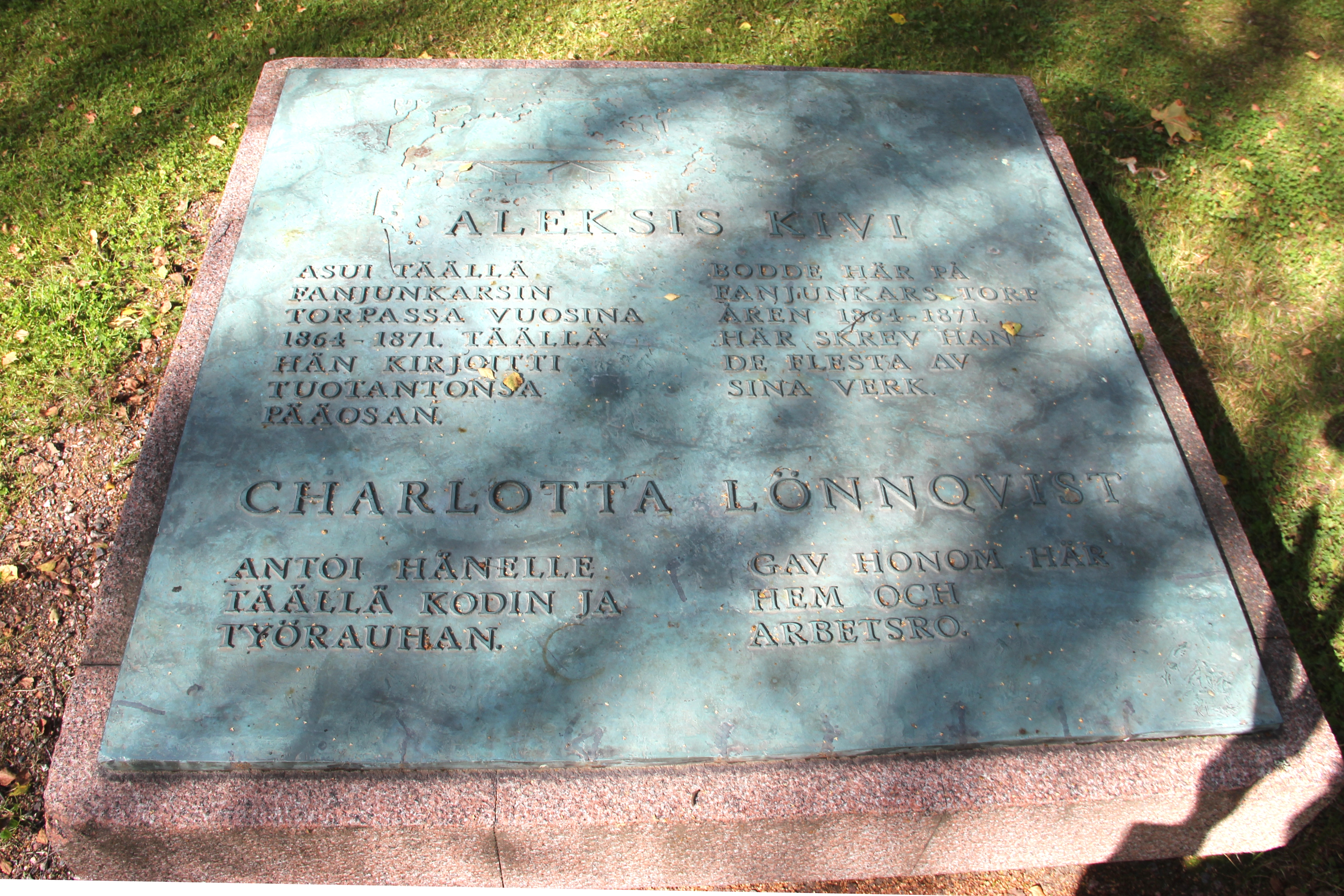
Memorial bronze slab in front of Fanjunkars in Siuntio.

A large memorial bronze slab, designed by Alvar Aalto, dedicated to Aleksis Kivi and Charlotta Lönnqvist, is situated in front of Fanjunkars. Additionally, a road in Siuntio municipal centre has been named after Lönnqvist.

In May 2025, it was announced that artist Iida Nurminen had won a competition for a new Siuntio memorial to Lönnqvist. The competition, organised by the Sjundby Traditionsförening, offered a first prize of 2,000 euros. Nurminen's winning design, Gynnarinnan - Laupiatar (English: The Benefactress), is a life-sized bronze sculpture depicting Lönnqvist sitting on a large piece of granite with a goose beside her. According to current plans, the sculpture will be erected in front of Fanjunkars croft in Siuntio on 12 May 2027.
