= Heath Cobblers =

1864 play by Aleksis Kivi

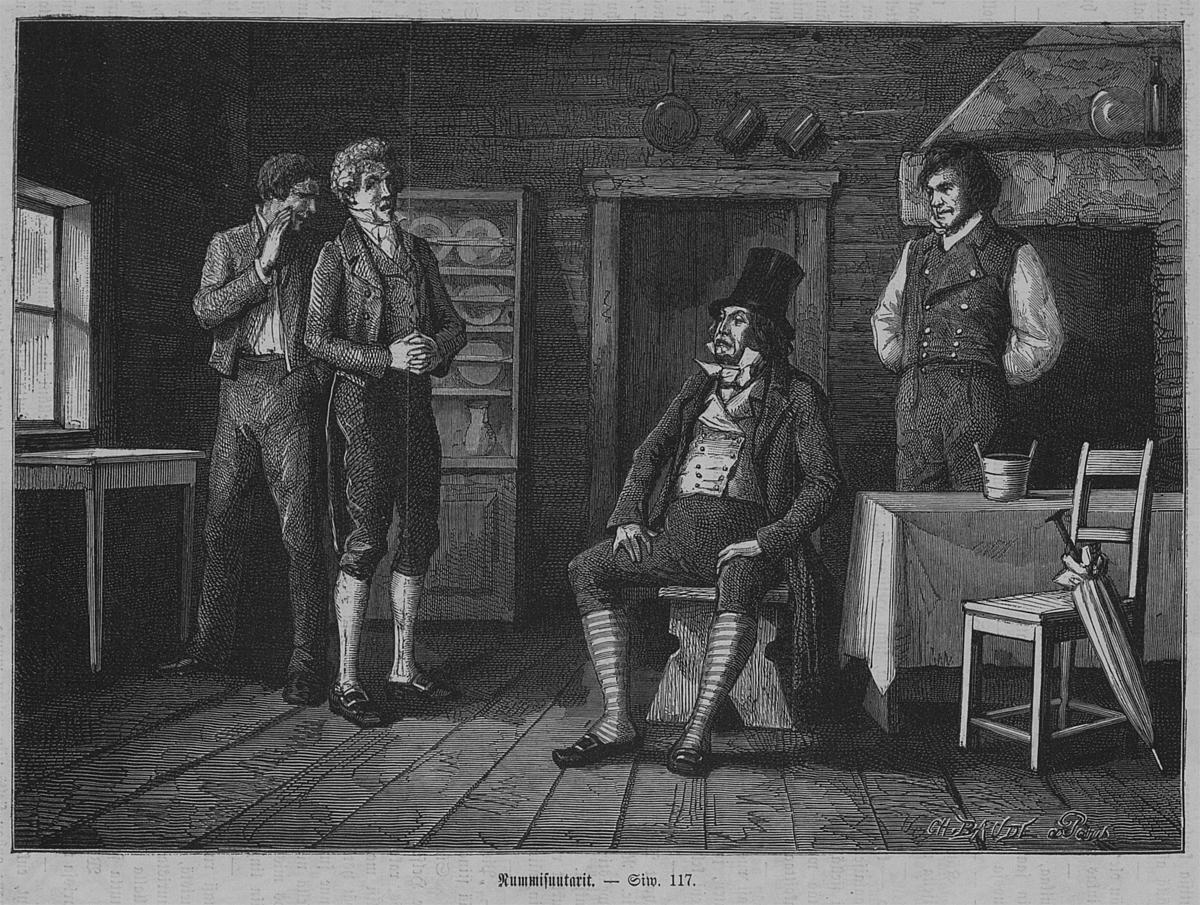
Albert Edelfelt's drawing from the performance of the Heath Cobblers play in Helsinki in the spring of 1876.

The Cobblers on the Heath (or Heath Cobblers in Douglas Robinson's 1993 translation; Finnish: Nummisuutarit) is a play by Aleksis Kivi, considered one of the greatest Finnish writers. The play was originally written in 1864. However, the play's official premiere took place only three years after Kivi's death; it was performed for the first time in Oulu on 24 September 1875.

The play is divided into five acts: the first act takes place in the room of Topias, the master cobbler, the second in the spacious house of Karri, the owner, and the third takes us to Hämeenlinna and the Halfway House Inn (’Puolmatkan krouvi’). The fourth act takes place in a forest, while the fifth and final act is played out outside Topias's room.

In Finland, Heath Cobblers has been considered a masterpiece of dramatic literature, which has also been translated into more than ten languages. As many as three film adaptations have also been made on the basis of the Heath Cobblers, The Village Shoemakers in 1923, and other adaptations in 1938 and 1957.

== Synopsis ==
=== Act One ===
The story begins with Topias the master cobbler and his irritable wife Martta, who, in their greed, want to marry off their underage and slightly dim son, Esko. They’re in a hurry, since an old will states that the inheritance will be given to the first to marry. It seems that their orphaned neighbour Jaana, whose father Niko ran off to sea, and who has been raised in Topias's house, might beat them to it, as she has fallen in love with Kristo, a young blacksmith, and the beneficiary of the will.

The inheritance will be given to the person who marries first. Martta cannot stand Kristo and she is very demanding towards Jaana, and out of avarice tries to prevent the marriage between the young couple. To Martta's delight, the talks between Topias and the householder Karri in the Halfway House Inn result in Esko being sent to propose to Karri's lovely daughter, Kreeta.

The village cantor Sepeteus comes to sign the document authorising Esko's marriage licence, and even though he knows the background to the matter and states his view, he eventually signs it. The unlettered Esko also wants to make his mark on the document, which of course leads to a conflict. Mikko Vilkastus, who is more conniving than Esko, goes with him to speak on the simpleton's behalf. As a subplot Esko's alcoholic brother Iivari is sent in turn to the town of Hämeenlinna to buy various things for the celebration of Esko and Kreeta's arrival.

=== Act Two ===
In the parlour at Karri's house meanwhile the wedding is in full swing, with Kreeta as the bride, but the groom turns out to be Jaakko the clog maker. Karri is astonished: as far as he was concerned, the marriage arrangements between Esko and Kreeta were just a joke. Father Topias and Karri's hazy deal at the inn has meant a wasted journey, which ends with Esko being provoked into a fight with the fiddler Teemu. As a consequence, Esko has to flee the scene with the mischievous Mikko Vilkastus, who was the one to egg him on.

=== Act Three ===
In the third act we find ourselves in Hämeenlinna, where Esko's brother Iivari is roaming the streets, miserable and hung over. As he is prone to drink, he has, together with his uncle Sakeri, spent the money raised for the wedding on booze. Iivari is racking his brains to find a way out of the financial pickle and to avoid the wrath of Martta and the other villagers. Sakeri, who was very helpful with emptying the bottles of liquor, comes up with a scheme – they will tell everyone that they have been robbed. They decide to run with the story and start heading towards Topias the (master) cobbler's house, obviously with the intention of spending their very last pennies at the Halfway House Inn.

After they have left, Jaana's father, the sailor Niko, bumps into the justice of the peace, Eerikki, on the street. The old friends start chatting about Niko's adventures abroad and his brief gaol sentence in Turku Castle, as well as about Eerikki's good fortune in becoming a justice of the peace. Niko asks about his daughter's whereabouts, seeing as her mother is now dead. Eerikki tells him about Jaana's rather harsh fate in being Martta and Topias’ foster child, and how Martta will not let Jaana marry Kristo, but is instead trying her utmost to marry off Esko. Niko decides there and then to head off to help his long-lost daughter. Eerikki goes his own way.

[The text of the play indicates an interval]

The curtain closes and the scene switches to the Halfway House Inn, where Niko has already arrived, as well as Iivari and Sakeri. The pair are discussing their reckless use of money and planning how to get out of the fix. Niko overhears their conversation and recognises the men. Yet he does not go to talk to them, since the innkeeper at that moment goes over to the pair to talk to them about a highwayman who has been seen wandering around the area and who has a huge bounty on his head. The innkeeper describes the thief, and the men fantasise about the relief that the reward would provide. Niko overhears this plan and decides to trick the men and, on top of that, get a free ride home. He asks the innkeeper to play along and together they disguise Niko as the missing highwayman. Iivari and Sakeri, who have since fallen out because of the lost money, fall for the ruse and capture Niko as he enters the inn. After agreeing on how to split the reward, they finally make their way towards home – giving incognito Niko his free ride.

=== Act Four ===
At the beginning of the fourth act, Mikko and Esko, who had fled after the fight with the fiddler, are trudging home along a forest path. They’ve been taking their time, visiting one inn after another, and have by now squandered all their money. This is mostly Mikko's fault, since Esko doesn’t drink. They’re quarrelling about how to deal with the situation: Esko wants to tell the truth about their trip, but Mikko would rather not face the consequences. Esko stops to gather some medicinal fir moss from the forest, because he thinks it will make amends for their unsuccessful trip. After Esko leaves, Mikko is joined by Kristo, Jaana's sweetheart, who is on his way to crash Esko's wedding. Mikko tells Kristo about the misfortunes they’ve had during their trip to the wedding, and they conclude that Kristo and Jaana might still be able to marry and get the inheritance. Kristo goes ahead to the cobbler's house to trick the family into believing that the wedding party is on its way.

When Esko returns from gathering medicinal plants, Mikko forces him to drink alcohol for the first time in his life. Mikko's plan is to get Esko drunk, goad him into an argument, and then flee the scene, thus avoiding Martta's wrath. After the fight Mikko darts off, and Esko meets Antres the tailor, who was sent to meet up with the wedding guests. As they are speaking, the alcohol starts to go to Esko's head, and he loses control, running around erratically. Esko becomes argumentative, and in his anger grabs Antres, accidentally causing him to faint. Esko thinks he has killed Antres. Meanwhile, Iivari, Sakeri and Niko, who is disguised as the thief, arrive on the scene. For a moment, everyone is horrified by Esko's ‘murderous act’, but then Antres regains consciousness. Antres and Esko are reconciled. The men share stories about their unsuccessful journeys and agree that it will all be worth it once they get home, hand over the thief and get their reward. They head off towards the cobbler's house, followed by two uninvited guests who want to crash Esko's wedding. On the way, they find Mikko, who had earlier run away and who has now badly injured his leg. Despite Mikko's protestations, they start dragging him towards the cobbler's house, since it is known that cantor Sepeteus, who also has first aid skills, is there.

=== Act Five ===
As the curtain opens on the fifth act, Topias and cantor Sepeteus are drinking and singing while waiting for the wedding party to arrive. Martta is not at all pleased with the situation, nor is she happy that her sons are nowhere to be seen. Villagers begin to arrive, clamouring after their own purchases Iivari was supposed to bring. Kristo arrives, falsely claiming that the wedding guests are on their way. Unexpectedly, a mixed crowd of people pull up in a cart: Iivari, Sakeri, Esko, Antres and Niko, who everyone still believes is the thief.

The men relate sanitised versions of their journeys – to propose to Kreeta and to go Hämeenlinna to buy things for the wedding- and they proudly present the “thief” who, they assume, will make amends for their wrongdoings. Jaana arrives and Niko immediately cries out, revealing his true identity as her father, and all hopes the men have of receiving the reward are lost. Chaos ensues, almost leading to a fight, but in the end Niko and Jaana embrace and she forgives her father. Niko's old friend Eerikki, the justice of the peace, arrives. Niko explains how he tricked his way there, asks about Kristo, and confirms that his daughter Jaana wants to marry him. Niko gives his blessing to the union, putting an end to the dreams of Martta, Topias and Esko ever getting their hands on the inheritance.

Mikko, who had injured his leg, is carried in. He is chastised, and Sepeteus says that Mikko is getting what he deserves and will have to limp for the rest of his life. Then the parents and other villagers lambast Esko, Iivari and their entourage. Karri has brought an action against Esko for his reckless behaviour at Kreeta and Jaakko's wedding, so everyone finds out what Esko did. Topias demands that Esko return the marriage licence, on which Esko had made his mark, which of course further upsets the master cobbler and his family.

Sepeteus declares that the righteous have been granted happiness and the wrongdoers punished. He congratulates Jaana, who is thankful for getting back her father and her beloved on the same day. She also whole-heartedly thanks Topias and Martta for taking care of her in spite of everything. This softens even Martta's stony heart towards the girl. All the hate and anger begins to subside and everyone begins to make peace. Jaana whispers a secret that Niko then says out loud: Jaana wishes to give half of her inheritance to the family of Topias and Martta, so they can take care of the damage their sons have caused. This creates such joy that no one can be angry any longer. Martta is touched by Jaana's kindness. Iivari regrets his many drinking sprees and announces that he's going to sea. Esko announces that women are not for him and decides never to get married. Martta welcomes all to the wedding table she had prepared for Esko and Kreeta: they can celebrate the engagement of Jaana and Kristo with this delicious food. Everyone goes inside while Antres plays ‘The March of the Pori Regiment’ on his reed whistle.

== See also ==
- The Seven Brothers
