= Fanjunkars =

Historical building and museum in Uusimaa, Finland

Coordinates: 60°08′08″N 24°13′40″E

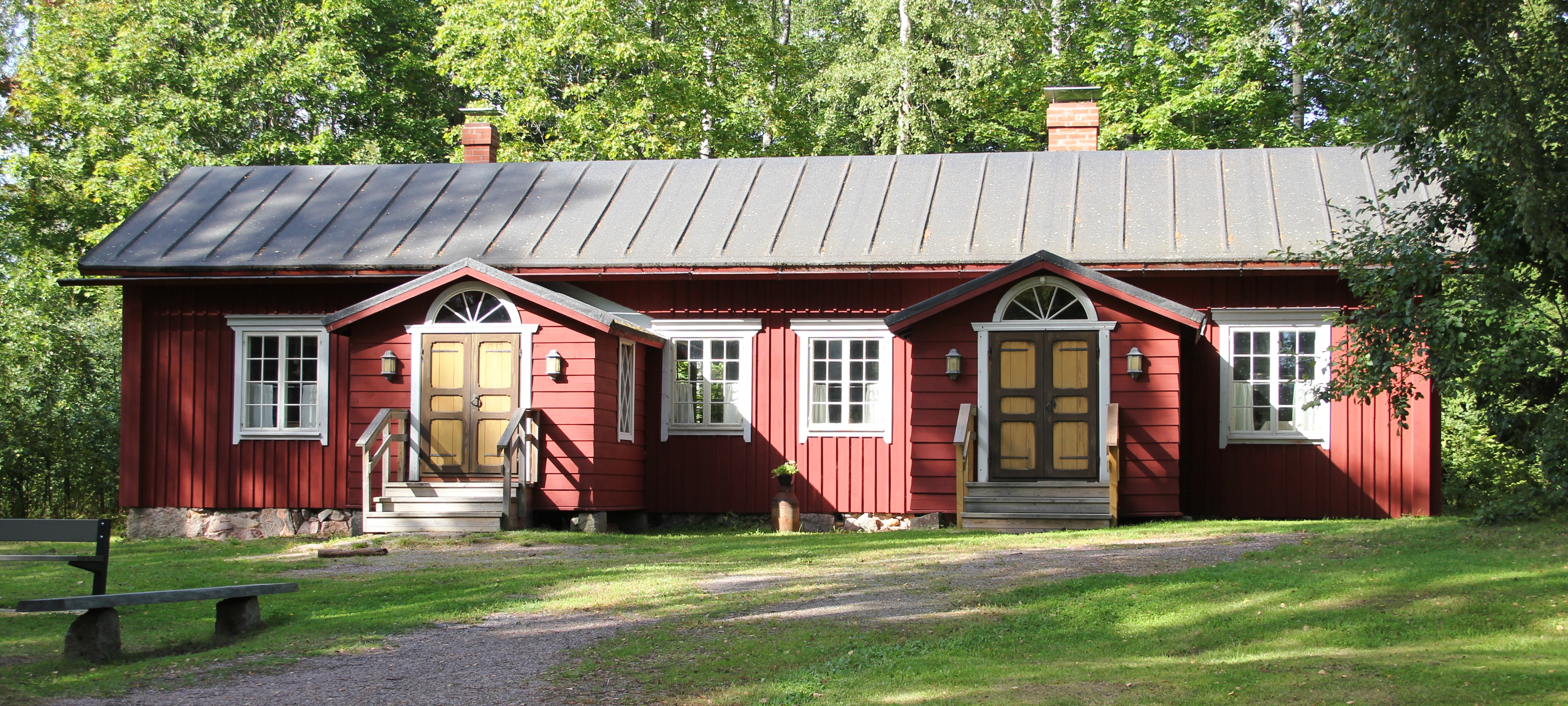
- Interactive map of the Fanjunkars area

General information
- Location: Siuntio, Uusimaa, Finland
- Year built: 2006
- Opened: 10 October 2006
- Owner: Pro Fanjunkars

Fanjunkars is a former military croft and a museum in Siuntio, Finland. The croft is known as a former residence of the national writer of Finland, Aleksis Kivi. Kivi lived in Fanjunkars, which was owned by Charlotta Lönnqvist, between 1864 and 1871 and wrote some of his most famous work there, such as The Seven Brothers.

The name Fanjunkars comes from Fanjunkare, an old Swedish military rank. This is due to the fact that Charlotta Lönnqvist's father, Johan Lönnqvist, was a Fanjunkare in the Swedish army. The area of Finland was a part of the Kingdom of Sweden until 1809. Lönnqvist's father was a war veteran and had served during the Finnish War in 1808. He owned the croft until 1850.

== History ==
=== The Old Fanjunkars ===
Originally Fanjunkars croft was located a few kilometers away from Sjundby Manor in what is nowadays known as Siuntio station area.

Aleksis Kivi lived in Fanjunkars from 1865 to 1871 and completed some of his most important works there.

After the death of Charlotta Lönnqvist in 1891 the lands of the croft were merged with two other crofts. In 1900 a small school was opened in Fanjunkars. The first teacher of the school was called Sigrid Liljefors. She was followed by Anna Liljeström in 1904. The school operated in Fanjunkars until 1930 when it was moved to Henriksberget.

=== The New Fanjunkars ===
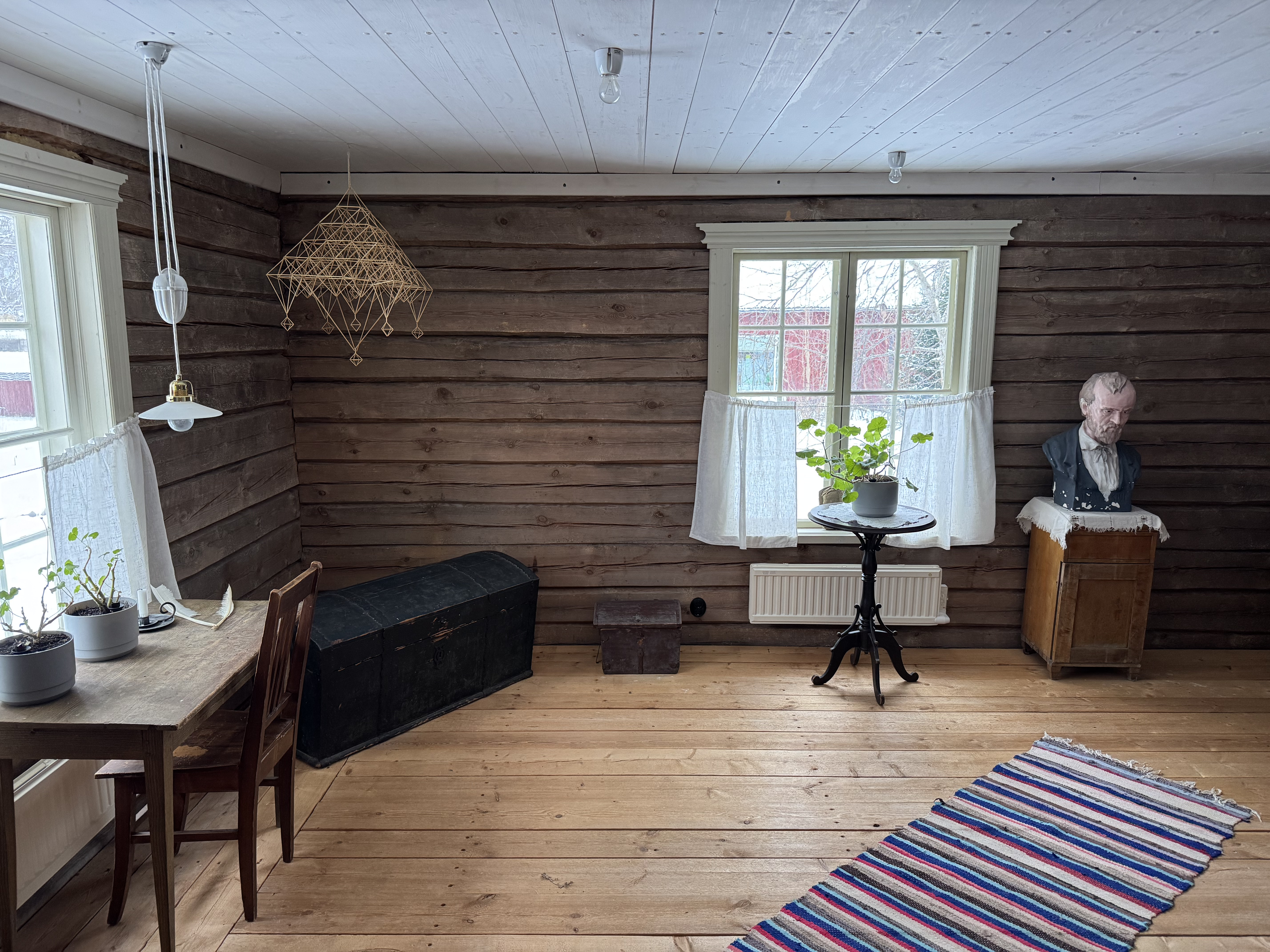
Museum room in Fanjunkars.

The Soviet Union leased parts of Finland in 1944 after the Second World War in accordance to Moscow Armistice between Finland, the Soviet Union, and the United Kingdom. Vast areas, approximately 30%, of the municipality of Siuntio fell to the leased area of Porkkala Naval Base, and even Fanjunkars croft was left behind the newly created border between Finland and Soviet Union. Fanjunkars croft was completely destroyed during the lease of the area.

A reconstruction of the croft, following the 19th-century style, was erected in Siuntio between 2003 and 2006. Foundation Pro Fanjunkars was founded by Siuntio Municipality, Siuntio Savings Bank Foundation (Sjundeå Sparbanksstiftelse), Siuntio Local Heritage Association (Hembygdens Vänner i Sjundeå) and the Finnish and Swedish speaking Lutheran parishes of Siuntio (Sjundeå svenska församling and Siuntion suomalainen seurakunta) to safeguard and take care of the new Fanjunkars. The reconstruction works were financed largely by Siuntio Savings Bank Foundation and the European Union via its local Pomoväst organisation and EU's Leader programme. The Prime Minister of Finland, Matti Vanhanen, officially opened the new Fanjunkars on Aleksis Kivi Day on the 10th of October 2006. The new croft has a museum room which has objects from the old Fanjunkars and objects that belonged to Kivi on display.
