= Leiermål =

Leiermål was a bureaucratic (legal and ecclesiastical) designation used in Scandinavia in approximately the 17th through 19th centuries on various forms of sexual relations outside of marriage. Leiermål had particular importance to women and men in all age and social groups in Scandinavia in the 1600s and 1700s because in this period, new laws and severe penalties were introduced in this area. Leiermål was considered a crime and were commonly detected in those cases that resulted in pregnancy, but pregnancy was not a prerequisite for the deed to be considered as illegal and punishable.

Various forms of leiermål had different severities. There were distinctions between simple or loose leiermål (sex between two unmarried persons), adultery (sex between a married and an unmarried person), and dobbelthor (adultery between two married people). In addition to the designation hor (fornication), there were also phrases such as samleie (sexual intercourse), "renting together", and "searching for a bed together".

== See also ==
- Adultery
