= August Ahlqvist =

Finnish professor, author and literary critic

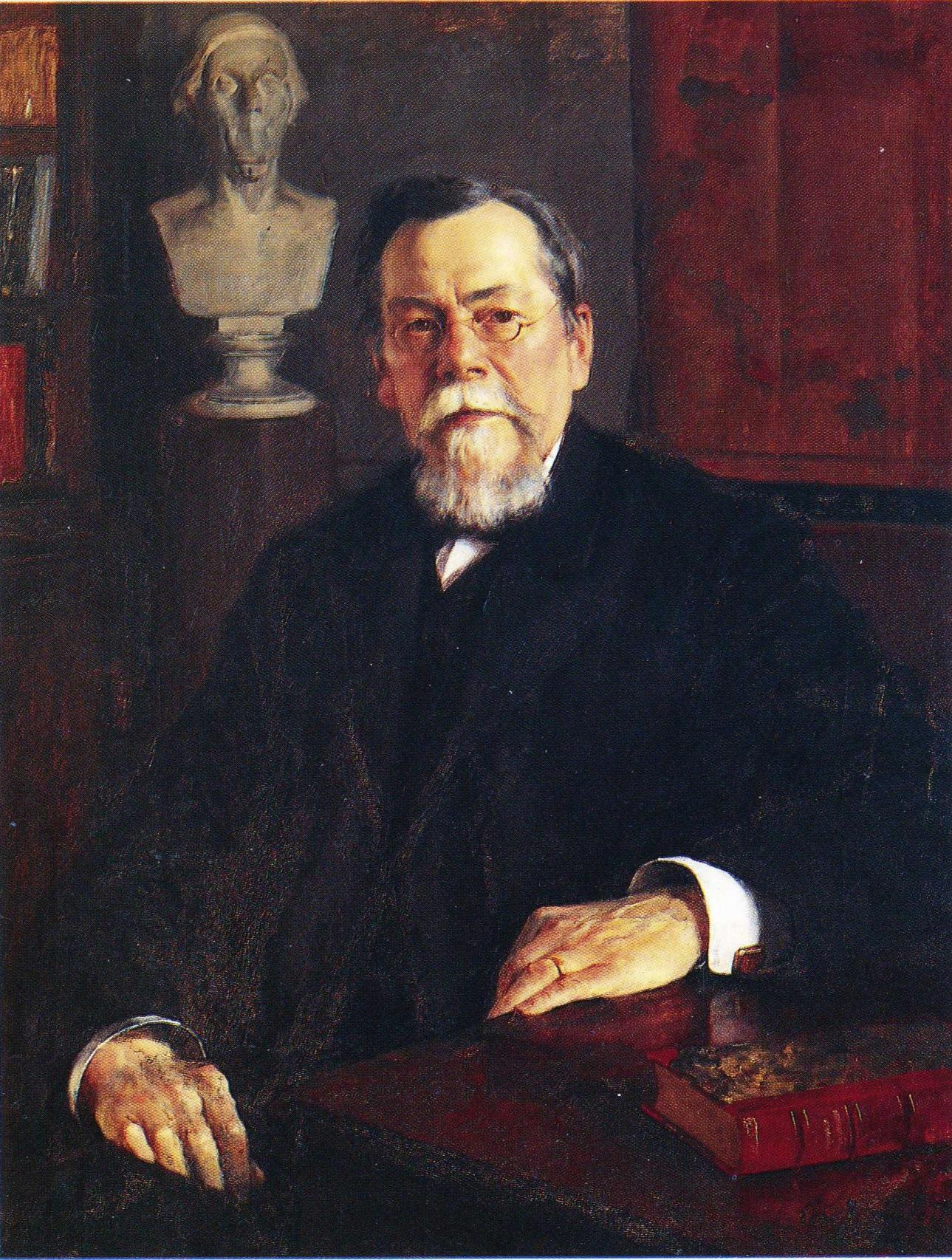
Portrait by Eero Järnefelt (1889)

Karl August Engelbrekt Ahlqvist, who wrote as A. Oksanen (7 August 1826 – 20 November 1889), was a Finnish professor, poet, scholar of the Finno-Ugric languages, author, and literary critic. He served as professor of Finnish language and literature at the Imperial Alexander University (now University of Helsinki) from 1863 as the successor to Elias Lönnrot, and as the university's rector from 1884 to 1887. Ahlqvist is regarded as one of the founders of Finno-Ugric studies alongside Matthias Alexander Castrén, and as a poet under the pen name A. Oksanen he introduced several new verse forms into Finnish-language poetry. He is also remembered as the sharpest critic of the writer Aleksis Kivi, who later rose to the position of the national author of Finland.

== Biography ==
=== Background and studies ===
Ahlqvist was born in Kuopio as the illegitimate child of Maria Augusta Ahlqvist (1806–1886), a servant. His father was Johan Mauritz Nordenstam (1802–1882), then an ensign and later a general, baron and vice-chancellor of the university; the paternity was widely known, and Nordenstam supported his son financially.

While at school in Kuopio, Ahlqvist came under the mentorship of Johan Vilhelm Snellman, who became the school's headmaster in 1843. Ahlqvist began publishing Finnish translations of poetry in Snellman's Swedish-language journal Saima, and translated Ludvig Stoud Platou's geography textbook into Finnish under the title Geografia eli maan opas – the first Finnish-language geography textbook, in which Ahlqvist coined Finnish words for globe, polar circle, equator and colony.

He became a student at the Imperial Alexander University in 1844, completing his Candidate of Philosophy degree in 1853 and his Licentiate of Philosophy in 1854. He was appointed docent in Finnish in 1859 and, succeeding Elias Lönnrot, professor of Finnish language and literature in 1863. Ahlqvist was the first to translate the works of Johan Ludvig Runeberg (1804–1877) into Finnish.

=== Research travels and linguistic work ===
In 1846 and 1847, Ahlqvist traveled through the eastern part of Ostrobothnia and Finnish and Russian Karelia, collecting folk poetry and investigating local dialects. From 1854 to 1858, he undertook extensive research trips among Finnic peoples in the Baltic Sea provinces, the province of Olonets, eastern Russia and Siberia, returning with a rich body of ethnographic and linguistic observations. He described these travels in Muistelmia matkoilta Wenäjällä 1854–1858, the first travelogue in Finnish, which has retained its position as a classic of Finnish travel writing. In 1861 and 1862, he made a study tour to Copenhagen, Berlin, Prague and Budapest, establishing important scholarly contacts.

Ahlqvist contributed to the reform of the Finnish language and was highly esteemed for his work in Finnish, Hungarian, Estonian and related languages. Among his most important scholarly works are Votisk grammatik (1855), Versuch einer mokscha-mordwinischen Grammatik (1861), Det vestfinska språkets kulturord (1871) – considered epoch-making in Finnish lexicology – and Suomen kielen rakennus (1877). He published his findings in Finnish, Swedish and German, and was one of the most internationally connected Finnish scholars of his time, holding membership and honorary membership in several foreign learned societies. He is regarded as one of the founders of Finno-Ugric studies alongside Matthias Alexander Castrén, with particularly notable contributions to the study of the Ob-Ugric languages after expeditions to the Khanty and Mansi in Siberia in 1877 and 1880.

He founded the Finnish-language newspaper Suometar together with fellow students in 1847, the first newspaper to address higher cultural matters in Finnish, and later established and edited the linguistic journal Kieletär (1871–1875).

=== Poet under the pen name A. Oksanen ===
Ahlqvist also worked as a poet, although his output was modest. His collection Säkeniä ("Sparks"), published in two parts in 1860 and 1868 (new edition 1874), is regarded as one of the clearest testaments to his contribution to the development of the Finnish literary language. Writing under the pen name A. Oksanen (a derivation of the Finnish word oksa, meaning "branch"), he alongside the traditional Kalevala metre employed classical metres such as the elegiac couplet and the sonnet form. Many of his poems were the first of their kind in Finnish – he wrote the first Finnish sonnet, the first artistic ballad, the first regional song and the first university promotion poem in Finnish. His best-known individual poems include "Savolaisen laulu" (Song of the Savonian) and "Sotamarssi" (War March), the latter written in memory of the Battle of Porrassalmi of 1789.

=== Literary criticism and the Kivi controversy ===
Ahlqvist was one of the most feared literary critics of his time. The principal target of his criticism was the work of Aleksis Kivi: he wrote a whole series of reviews of Kivi's works, including reviews of Seitsemän veljestä (Seven Brothers), Kullervo and Margareta, as well as reviews of Kivi's poetry, and after Kivi's death he composed an invective poem about him. Such a sustained run of condemnations is exceptional in the history of Finnish literary criticism. Ahlqvist's criticism focused on Kivi's language, its dialectal basis and its depiction of reality.

=== University administrator and later years ===
Ahlqvist was active in university administration as vice-rector from 1878 to 1881, dean of the Historical-Linguistic Section from 1882 to 1884, and rector from 1884 to 1887. As rector he delivered the first inaugural address in Finnish at the university. He was also a noted ceremonial speaker, addressing the Runeberg celebrations in 1878, the 25th anniversary of Alexander II's reign in 1880, and the Lönnrot celebrations in 1884. His Finnish-language promotion poem from 1869 has been described by historian Matti Klinge as a significant document in the cultural history of Finland.

Ahlqvist was awarded the title of Councillor of State in 1887 and retired as professor emeritus in 1888. He intended to devote himself to research after leaving the rectorate but died of pneumonia in Helsinki the following year.

=== Personality ===
Ahlqvist was described as exceptionally dutiful and hard-working, but stern both with himself and with others. He had an angular temperament and was prone to disputes, suffering also from problems with alcohol. As he expressed it in one of his own poems, it seemed there lived in him yks enkeli, yks perkele – "one angel, one devil".

== Works ==
- Satu, 1847
- Bidrag till finska. Finska språkforskningens historia, 1854
- Viron nykyisemmästä kirjallisuudesta, 1855
- Wotisk grammatik jemte språkprof och ordförteckning, 1855
- Anteckningar i Nordtschudiskan, 1859
- Muistelmia matkoilta Venäjällä vuosina 1845–58, 1859
- Läran om verbet i mordwinska, 1859
- Laulu kellosta (Friedrich Schiller), 1859 (translator)
- Väkinäinen naiminen (Molière) (translator)
- Kavaluus ja rakkaus (Schiller), 1863 (translator)
- Säkeniä I-II, 1860, 1868
- Versuch einer mokscha-mordwinischen Grammatik nebst Texten und Wörterverzeichniss, 1861
- Suomalainen runousoppi kielelliseltä kannalta, 1863
- Auszüge aus einer neuen Grammatik der finnischen Sprache, 1868
- Suomalainen murteiskirja, 1869
- Det vestfinska språkets kulturord, 1871
- Uusi suomalainen lukemisto suomalais-ruotsalaisen sanakirjan kanssa, 1873
- Suomen kielen rakennus, 1877
- Täydellinen Kalevalan sanasto, 1878
- Unter Wogulen und Ostjaken, 1883
- Elias Lönnrot, 1884
- Tutkimuksia Kalevalan tekstissä ja tämän tarkastusta, 1886
- Kalevalan karjalaisuus, 1887
- Suomalaisia puhekokeita, 1889
- Wogulisches Wörterverzeichnis, 1891
- Wogulische Sprachtexte nebst Entwurf einer wogulischen Grammatik aus dem Nachlass des Verfassers. Hrsg. von Yrjö Wichmann, 1894
- Oksasen runoja, 1898
- Kirjeet, 1982

Educational offices
Preceded by Wilhelm Lagus	Rector of Imperial Alexander University; 1884–1887	Succeeded by Thiodolf Rein
