= Finnish national road 51 =

Road in Uusimaa region, Finland

Highway 51
- Kantatie 51 (Finnish); Stamväg 51 (Swedish)
- Länsiväylä, Jorvaksentie, Inkoon Ranikkotie
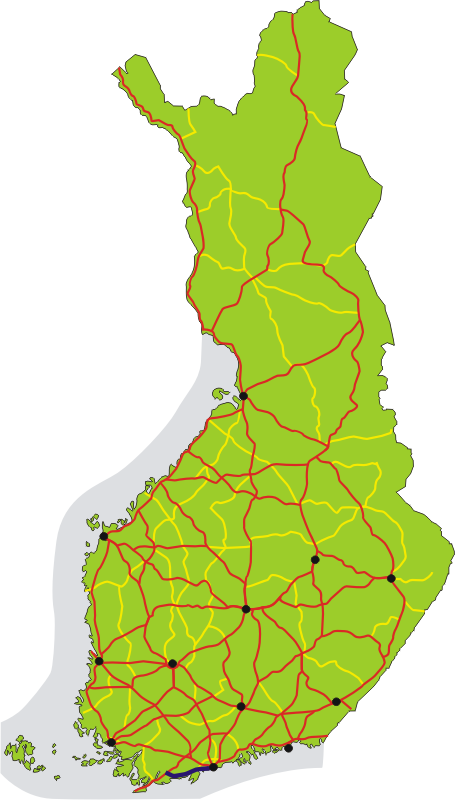

Route information
- Maintained by the Finnish Transport Agency
- Length: 74 km (46 mi)
- Existed: 1938–present

Major junctions
- From: Helsinki
- To: Karis

Location
- Country: Finland
- Major cities: Espoo

Highway system
- Highways in Finland
← Kt 50	→ Kt 52

The Finnish national road 51 (Finnish: Kantatie 51; Swedish: Stamväg 51) is the 2nd class main route between the major cities of Helsinki and Raseborg in southern Finland. It runs from Ruoholahti in Helsinki and passes through Espoo to Kirkkonummi as a motorway called Länsiväylä (Swedish: Västerleden), where it continues to Karis in Raseborg as a smaller road.

== History ==
In 1938, the newly-completed Jorvaksentie road running west from Helsinki and its extension to Hanko via Kirkkonummi, Ingå and Ekenäs was named main road 51. The road was realigned in 1944 because the previous route ran through the Porkkala Naval Base that had been leased to the Soviet Union under the terms of the Moscow Armistice. The route was moved to bypass the leased area, so it ran along the eastern shore of Espoonlahti Bay along the current Old Saunalahdentie and Kurttilantie to Kauklahti and further along current link road 1130 to Lapinkylä, Siuntio and the south of Virkkala. At Virkkala the road connected with main road 53 (now national road 25). Later the road lost its status as a main road, but when the new section from Kirkkonummi to Karis was completed in 1972, the main road 51 designation was restored.

The first motorway section of main road 51, then Jorvaksentien, was completed to the west of Lauttasaari shortly before the mid-1960s, and the connection to Helsinki opened after the completion of the Lapinlahti Bridge in 1965. Before this, only a low-capacity 1930s bridge was in use. The motorway to Espoonlahti was completed in the late 1960s.

The road between Kivenlahti and Kirkkonummi in Espoo used to be a congested two-lane road. In March 2010, construction work on a new motorway began and was completed on 29 October 2013.

== Route ==
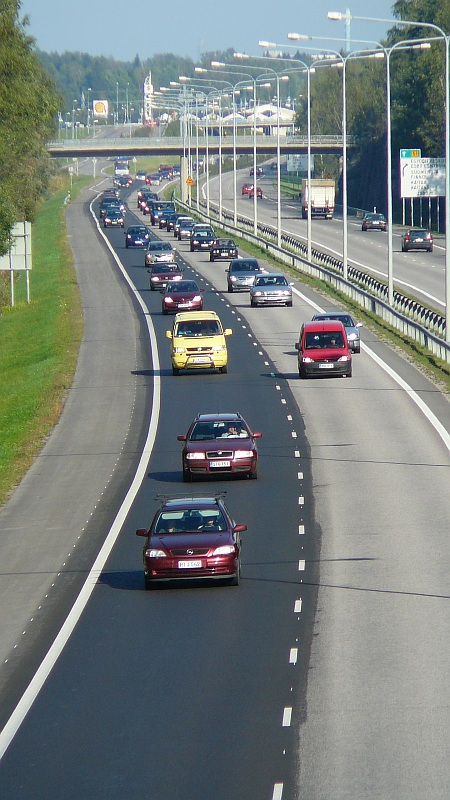
Finnish national road 51 in Nöykkiö, Espoo.

The road passes through the following localities:

- Helsinki (Ruoholahti and Lauttasaari)
- Espoo (Keilaniemi, Matinkylä and Nöykkiö)
- Kirkkonummi (Sarsvik, Jorvas, Kirkkonummi, and Vuohimäki)
- Siuntio (Fågelvik)
- Ingå (Degerby and Ingå)
- Raseborg) (Svarvarböle and Karis)
