= Veikkola =

- Village
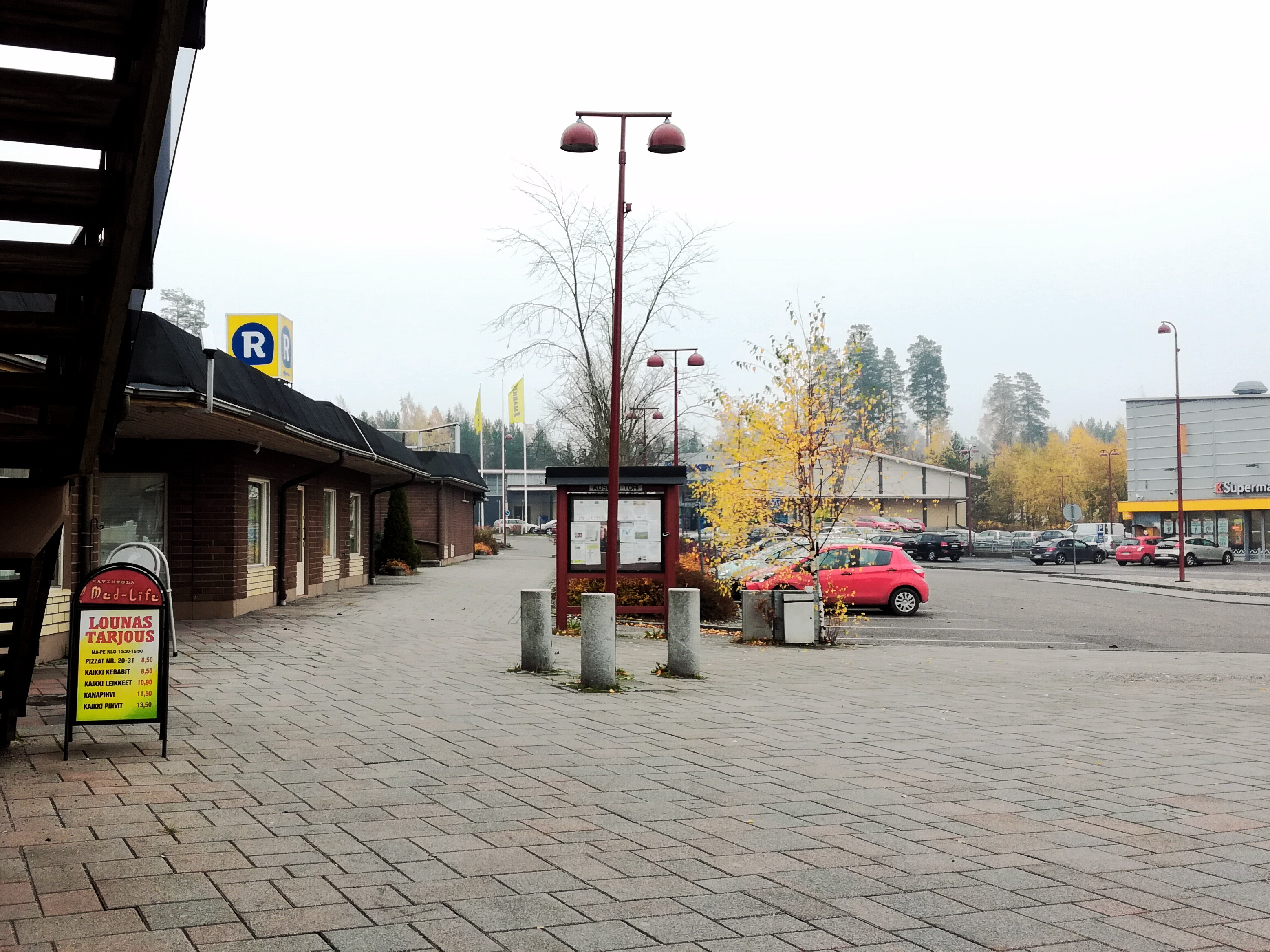
- The centre of Veikkola.

- Location within Uusimaa
- Country: Finland
- Region: Uusimaa
- Municipality: Kirkkonummi

Population (31 December 2020)
  - Total: 5,924
- Time zone: UTC+2 (EET)
  - Summer (DST): UTC+3 (EEST)

Veikkola (Finnish: [ˈʋei̯kːolɑ]) is a village in Kirkkonummi municipality in Uusimaa, Finland. It is located about 20 kilometres (12 mi) north of the municipal center along the Helsinki–Turku Highway (E18), near the border of Vihti. The regional road 110 also passes through the village. Veikkola has almost 6,000 inhabitants. Near Veikkola is the Nuuksio National Park.

There are two elementary schools in Veikkola, of which Veikkola School (Veikkolan koulu) is a 1–9 grade comprehensive school and Vuorenmäki School (Vuorenmäen koulu) is a 1–6 grade elementary school. Veikkola School was founded in 1899, and the current school building was built in 2004. Veikkola also has a health center, a library, several kindergartens and a nursing home, and a sports park with a soccer field. Veikkola also has three grocery stores: S Group's S-Market and Kesko's K-Market and K-Supermarket, and one R-kioski convenience store.

There were plans for a railway station along the Helsinki–Turku high-speed railway, but the plan was abandoned after Kirkkonummi's municipal council rejected the railway's shareholder agreement by a vote of 36–15 on December 8, 2025.

== See also ==
- Evitskog
- Nummela (Vihti)
- Ojakkala
