= Tervalampi =

Village in Uusimaa, Finland

Coordinates: 60°19.43′N 24°24.2′E

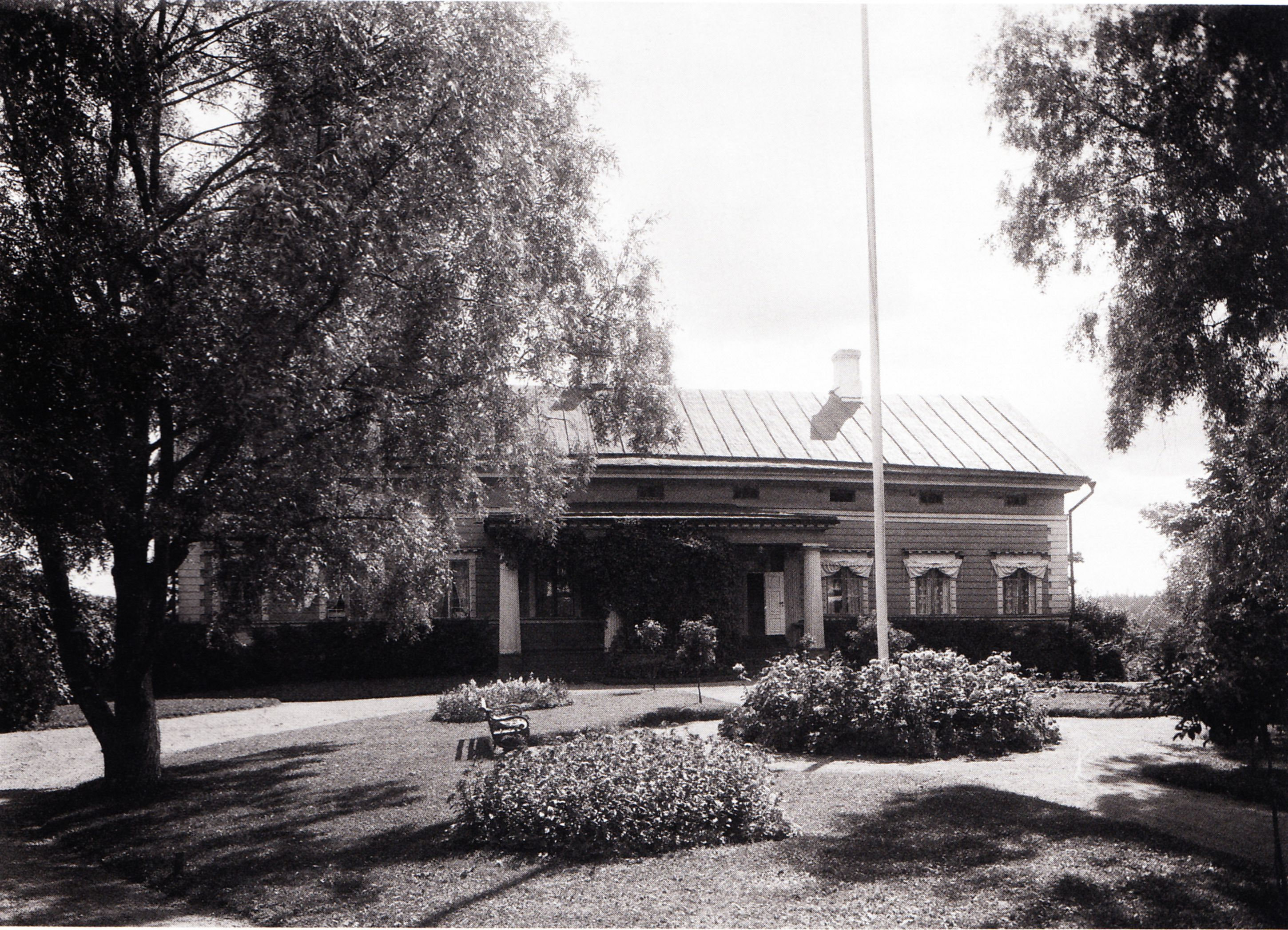
The Tervalampi Manor in 1915

Tervalampi is a village at the border of the municipalities Vihti and Kirkkonummi in the Uusimaa region in Finland. It belongs to the municipality of Vihti. The village is approximately 40 km from Helsinki and has close to 580 inhabitants. The water bodies of the village are south of lake Poikkipuoliainen, the north of lake Huhmarjärvi, the south of lake Kaitlampi, Ruuhilampi, Kurjolampi and Tervalampi, from which the village got its name.

The village hosts a large part of the Nuuksio National Park. Tervalampi is also famous for Tervalampi Mansion that was formed in 1641. The current building of the Mansion was built in 1830. In 1936, the Mansion was bought by the city of Helsinki who still owns it. The Tervalampi Mansion became a rehabilitation center for people with addiction in 1981 and it run until December 2019.

Tervalampi has a riding stable, several associations and a village house Sampola. The closes supermarket is in Ojakkala, a village 5 km from Tervalampi. The closest large centre of services is in Nummela 10 km from Tervalampi.
