= Finnish national road 25 =

Road in Finland

National Road 25
- Valtatie 25 (Finnish); Riksväg 25 (Swedish)
- Valtatie 25, Riksväg 25
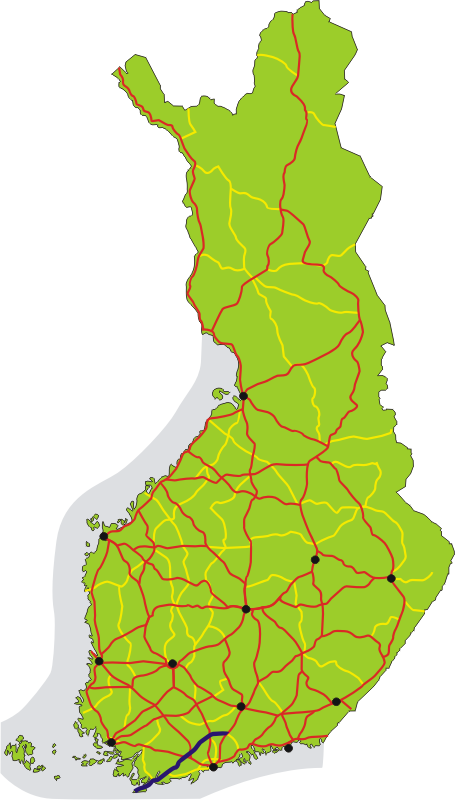

Route information
- Maintained by the Finnish Transport Agency
- Length: 171 km (106 mi)
- Existed: 1996–present

Major junctions
- From: Hanko
- To: Vt 4 in Mäntsälä

Location
- Country: Finland
- Major cities: Ekenäs, Lohja, Hyvinkää

Highway system
- Highways in Finland

The Finnish national road 25 (Finnish: Valtatie 25, Hangonväylä; Swedish: Riksväg 25, Hangöleden) is the main route between the major cities of Hanko and Hyvinkää in southern Finland. It runs from Tulliniemi in Hanko to the Maisala in Mäntsälä, where it continues to Porvoo as the 2nd class main road 55. Together with the aforementioned road, it forms the Helsinki Metropolitan Circuit and is often referred to as the outer beltway of the Greater Helsinki or also known as the Ring V.

== History ==
In the 1938 numbering system, the route from Helsinki via Tammisaari to Hanko was numbered as main road 51, and the route from Nummenkylä in Lohja to Tammisaari via Lohja was numbered as main road 53. When Porkkala was leased to the Soviet Union, main road 51 was rerouted to run through Virkkala in Lohja, shortening main road 53 to the route between Nummenkylä and Virkkala. Main road 51 was later rerouted to end in Karis, and the route between Virkkala and Hanko became part of main road 53. In 1968, main road 53 was extended to Hyvinkää and was extended further to Mäntsälä in 1979. The Tammisaari bypass was completed in 1972 and the Karis bypass in 1983.

In the 1996 numbering reform, main road 53 was renumbered to national road 25. Road 319 between Tuulos and Padasjoki was renumbered to main road 53 a few months earlier; as a result, main road 53 existed in two locations for a short time.

== Route ==
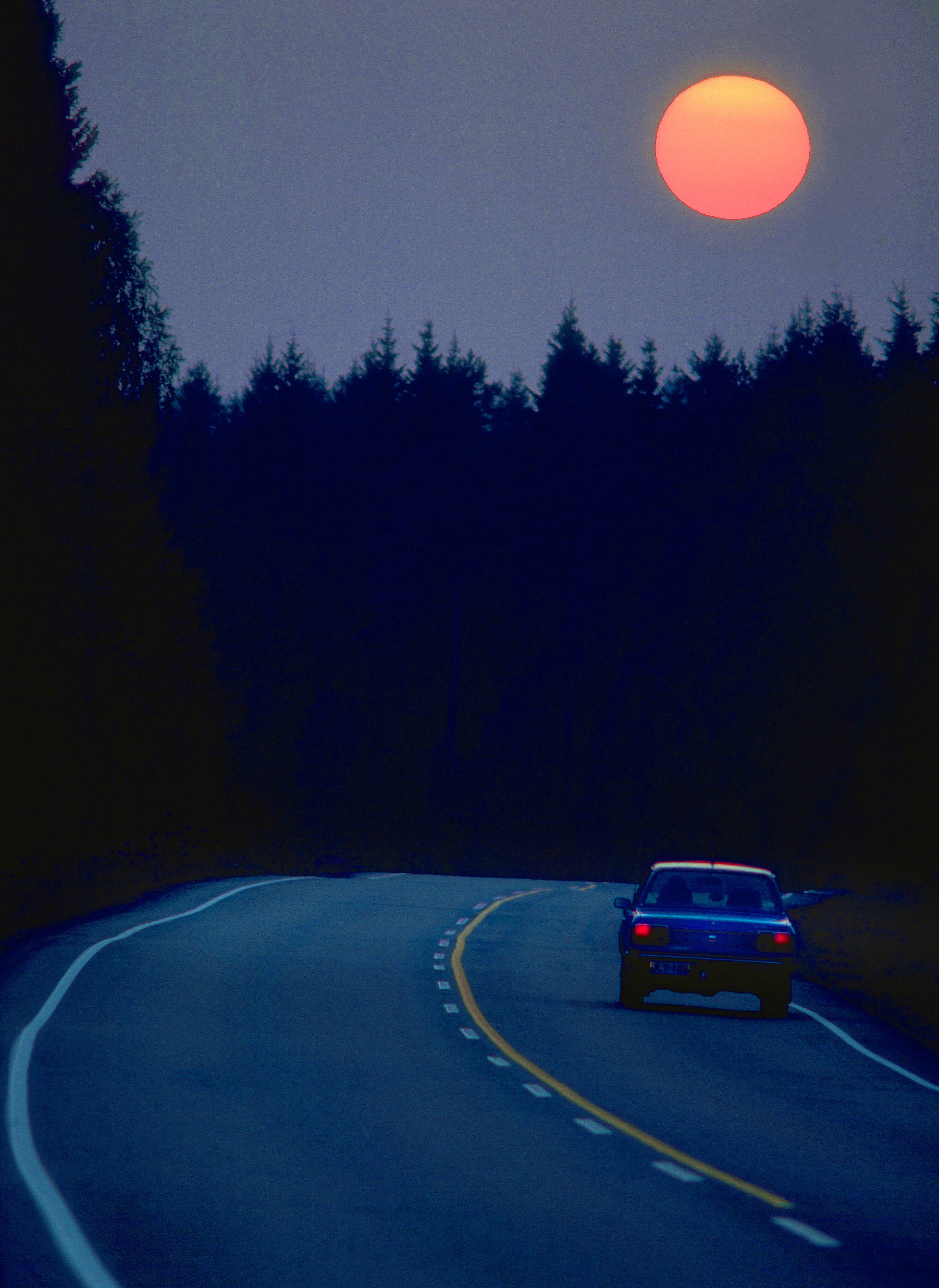
Road between Hanko and Hyvinkää at sunset, early 1990s.

The road passes through the following municipalities, localities in brackets:

- Hanko
- Raseborg (Ekenäs and Karis)
- Lohja (Virkkala, Lohja and Muijala)
- Vihti (Nummela, Ojakkala and Otalampi)
- Nurmijärvi (Röykkä, Rajamäki and Herunen)
- Hyvinkää (Hyvinkää, Ridasjärvi)
- Mäntsälä (Hirvihaara and Mäntsälä)
