= Upinniemi =

Village and garrison in Kirkkonummi, Finland

Coordinates: 60°01′45″N 24°21′30″E

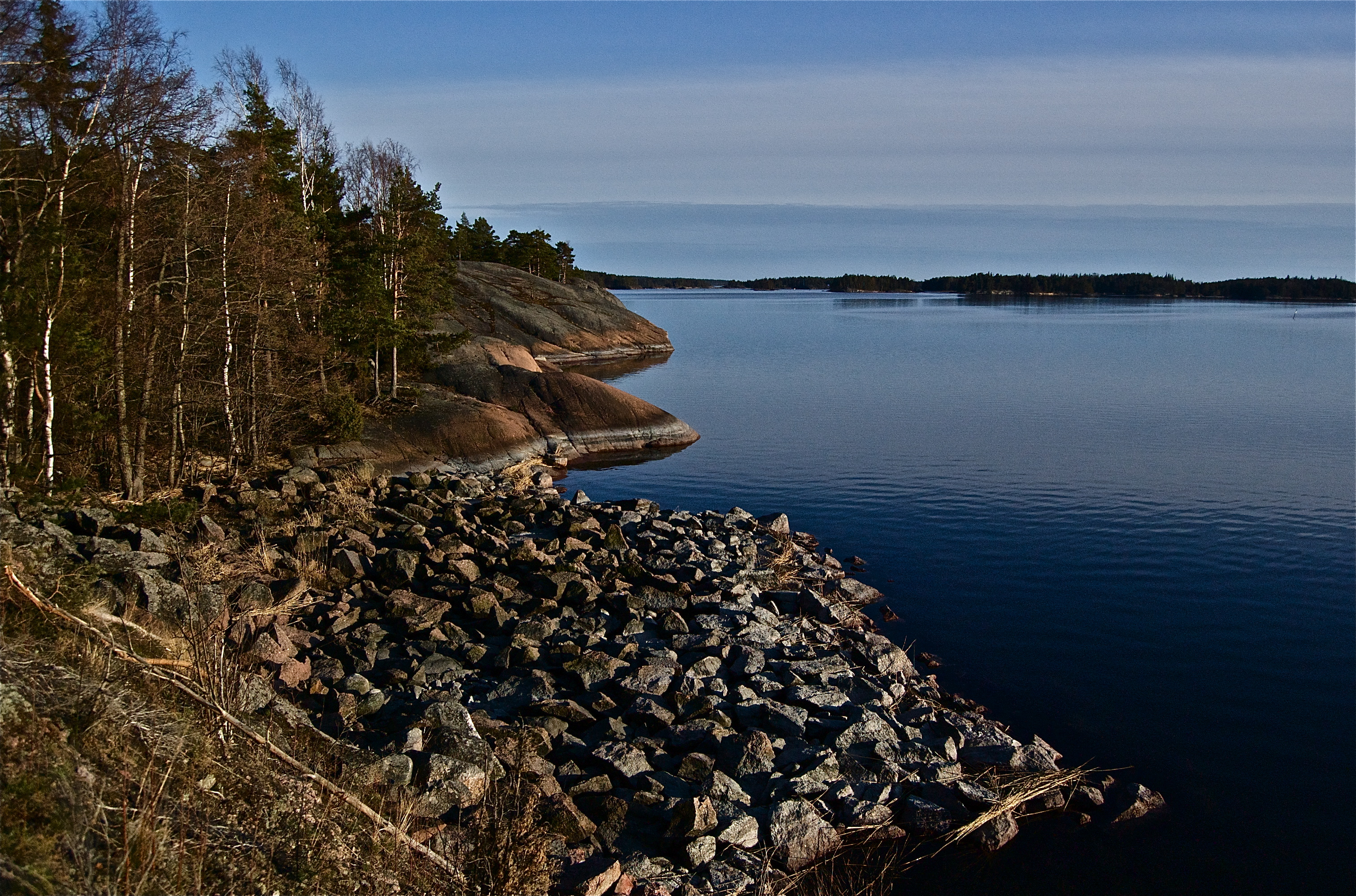
Gulf of Finland at Upinniemi

Upinniemi (Swedish: Obbnäs) is a village in the municipality of Kirkkonummi in southern Finland. It is located approximately 12 km south of the municipal centre.

Upinniemi is dominated by the Finnish naval base, which is one of the largest military installations in the country. The headquarters of the Gulf of Finland Naval Command is also located there.

== Finnish naval base ==
The Finnish naval base headquarters is located in Kirkkonummi, which is approximately 30 km west of Helsinki, while the military port facilities are nearer the village of Upinniemi.

The base is home to several elements of the Finnish Navy's fleet, including the Coastal Brigade, surface warfare units and support units. Naval training is also organized as a subunit at the base.

The base has hosted joint naval exercises with the U.S. Marine Corps in August 2022, even prior to Finland's accession to NATO in 2023. In 2024, Finland opened up more specific military cooperation with the United States Navy, including a P-8A anti-submarine station at the Upinniemi military port.

== History ==
Beginning late in World War II, from 1944 to 1956, the Soviet Union operated the Porkkala Naval Base on Upinniemi, under a lease agreement with Finland.

== See also ==
- Kantvik
