= Evitskog =

Village in Kirkkonummi, Finland

Coordinates: 60°11′N 24°20′E

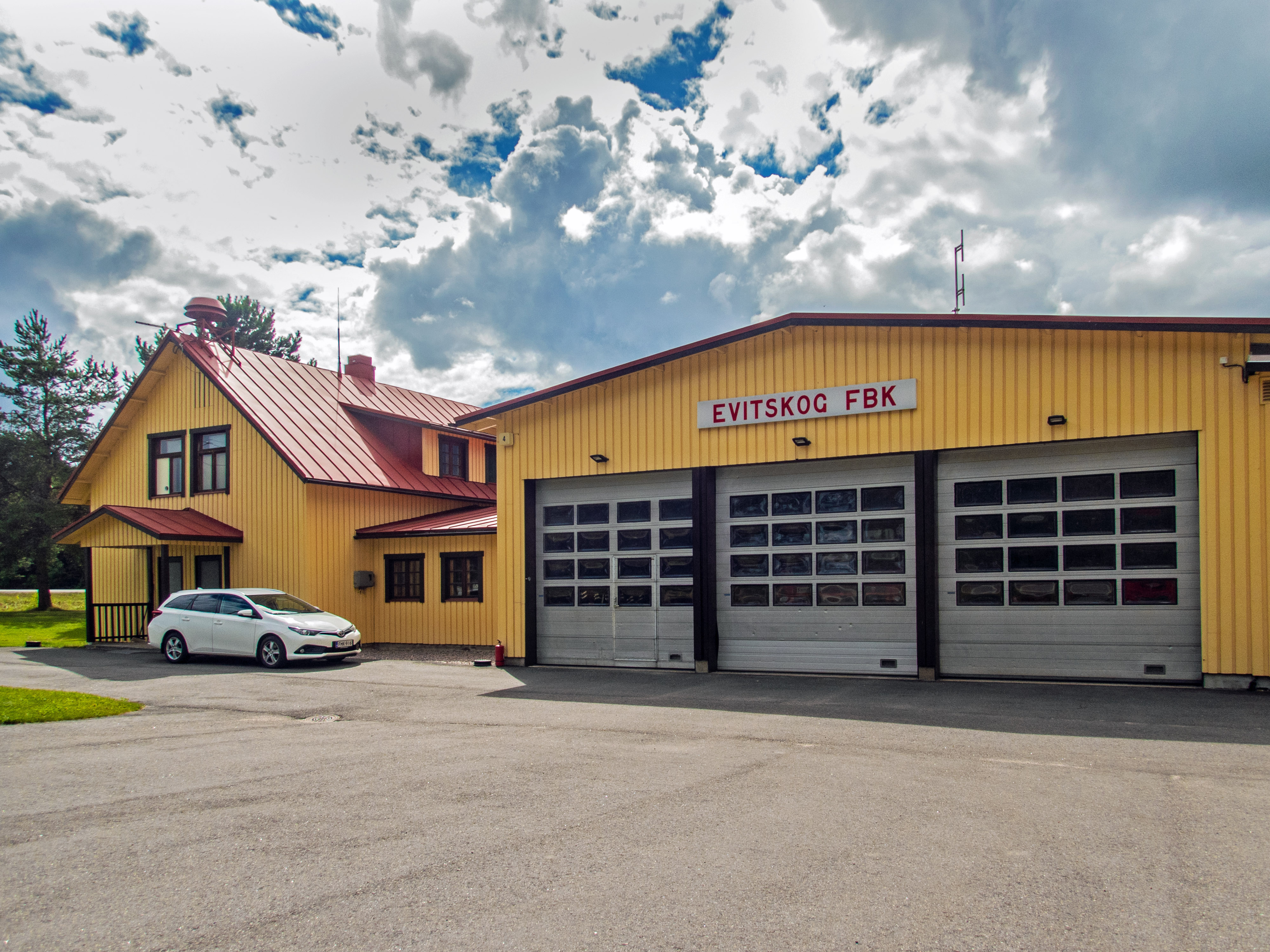
Evitskog Fire Brigade in the village.

Evitskog is a village of approximately 600 inhabitants in Kirkkonummi municipality. It is situated in western Uusimaa region, southern Finland, just outside the Helsinki Metropolitan Area. Distance to Helsinki is 30 km, and to Kirkkonummi town center 15 km. Nearest shops and local services are in Lapinkylä, roughly 6 km away.

The name of Evitskog is a compound of an Old Swedish given name Övidher or Ödvidher and the word skog meaning 'forest'. The same given name is also found in Övitsböle, the Swedish name for the Ylästö district of Vantaa.

The voluntary fire brigade, Evitskog FBK, was founded 1931, and it is the oldest voluntary fire brigade in Kirkkonummi. The red fire brigade building is a landmark of Evitskog.

In 1970s the trade union TVK built a course center for its members in Evitskog. The building was later changed to housing unit for foreign guest workers especially from Estonia. In August 2015 an asylum seekers' centre moved to the location. It provides accommodation for 260 people.

Singer-songwriter Paradise Oskar is from Evitskog.
