= St. Michael's Church, Kirkkonummi =

Coordinates: 60°07′30″N 24°26′22″E

St. Michael's Church in Kirkkonummi
- Kyrkslätts kyrka / Kirkkonummen kirkko
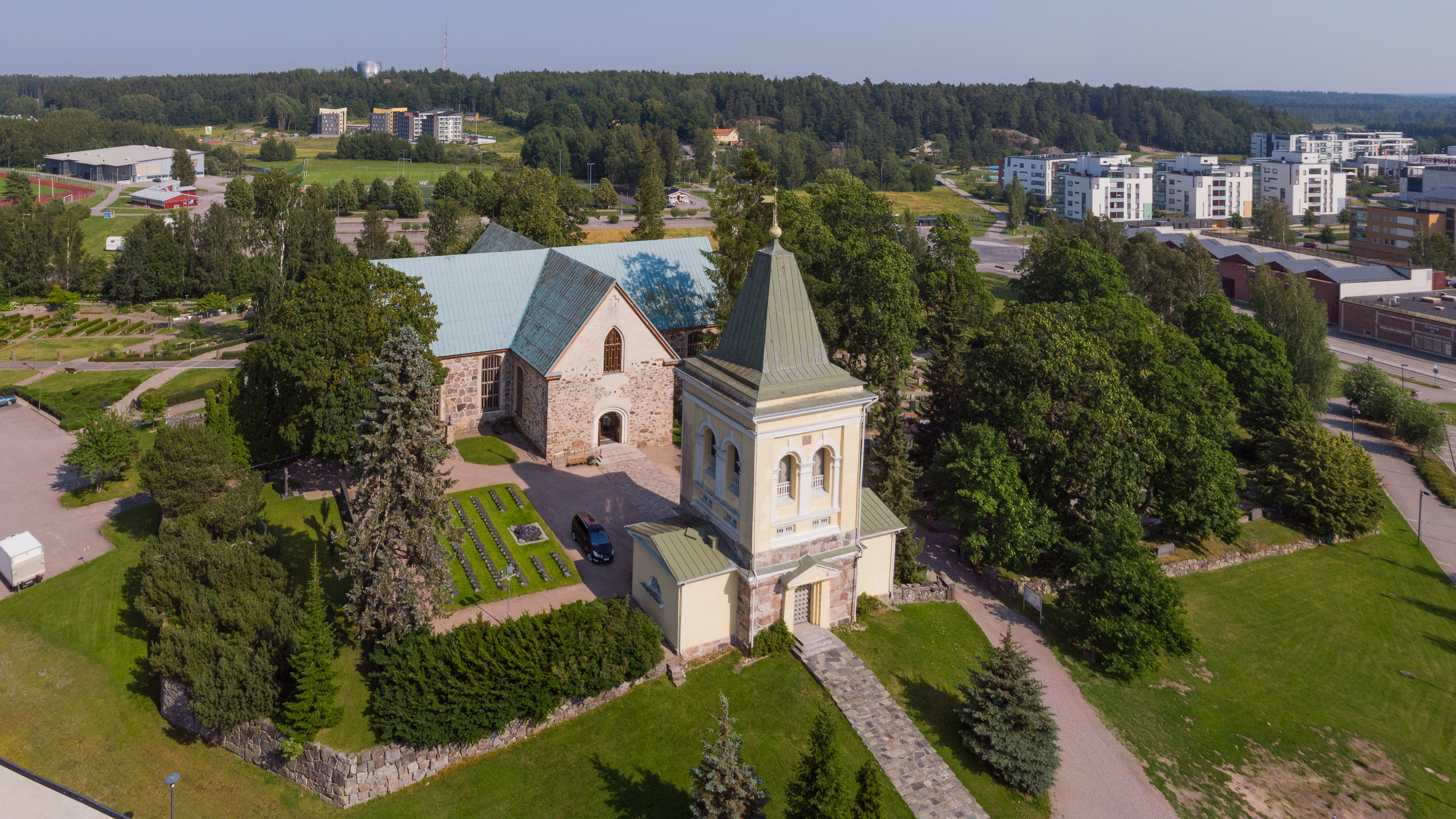
- St. Michael's Church during summer 2022
- St. Michael's Church in Kirkkonummi
- Location: Kirkkonummi, Uusimaa
- Country: Finland
- Language(s): Finnish, Swedish
- Denomination: Evangelical Lutheran
- Previous denomination: Roman Catholic
- Religious institute: Evangelical Lutheran Church of Finland

History
- Dedication: St. Michael

Architecture
- Architectural type: Gothic
- Years built: Between 1400 and 1490

Administration
- Diocese: Diocese of Borgå, Diocese of Espoo
- Parish: Kyrkslätts svenska församling, Kirkkonummen suomenkielinen seurakunta

St. Michael's Church in Kirkkonummi is a gothic, medieval stone church in the Finnish municipality of Kirkkonummi, located in the municipal town centre. The church was built somewhere between 1400 and 1490. The original medieval brick walls are still to be seen in the eastern part of the church.

Kirkkonummi Church is consecrated to St. Michael. The church is shared by the Swedish-speaking parish of Kirkkonummi (Swedish: Kyrkslätts svenska församling) and the Finnish-speaking parish of Kirkkonummi (Finnish: Kirkkonummen suomenkielinen seurakunta).

Originally the church was Roman Catholic but after the Reformation it was converted to Lutheranism.

== History ==
There have been various earlier wooden churches on the same place where St. Michael's Church nowadays stand. During the Middle Ages a safe sea route went past the hill which the church was built on.

=== Late Middle Ages ===
It is hard to date the different parts of the St. Michael's church since the later stages of construction and rebuilding have demolished large parts of the original features of the church. Nowadays the only original medieval brickwork can be found on the parts of the eastern wall of the church.

The central part of St. Michael's Church was masoned by the end of the 15th century. Apparently the parish was lacking funds since the church was left unfinished in many parts. A portion of the church was still built out of wood and no brick vaults had been constructed.

=== Modern times ===
In the 1570s St. Michael's Church was repaired twice: first Russian soldiers damaged the church badly and after that the church was hit by a lightning bolt and caught fire. The next major renovation was conducted in 1637.

St. Michael's Church was enlarged several times during the 18th and 19th centuries. The church was built into a form of a cross in the mid 19th century. In 1847 the medieval sacristy was demolished and a new sacristy with brick walls was built on the old one's place. The bell tower was built in 1824.

=== Porkkala Naval Base ===
During 1944–1956 the Soviet Union rented Porkkala Naval Base from Finland. St. Michael's Church was part of this new rental area. New borders were drawn and people living on the new rental area had to be evacuated quickly. The Soviets used the church as a cultural house. Parts of the church's interior were evacuated to the northern part of Kirkkonummi to Haapajärvi Church.

After the rental era St. Michael's Church was repaired under the conduct of architect Olof Hansson. The church was reconsecrated in 1959. The latest restoration of the church was completed in 1997.

== Interior ==
Artist Lennart Segerstråle has designed the glass paintings of the naves in 1930. The paintings are called "The Window of Comparison", "The Window of Suffering", "the Window of Resurrection" and "the Window of Praise".

In 1944 Segerstråle was among others helping to evacuate the interior of the church. He left a drawing for the Soviets with a Russian text saying "Jesus Christ the saviour of all peoples". The drawing was seen and it was ordered to be destroyed. Fortunately a Finnish officer hid the drawing in his home and in 1980 it was returned to St. Michael's Church, restored, and hung on the northern wall.

The altar does not have an altar painting anymore. The old altar painting by Robert Wilhelm Ekman portraying Christ's enlightenment, completed in 1862, is now located on the wall of a side aisle of the church. Another painting in the church chapel is by J. Tolker and it portrays the Holy Communion. This painting was completed in 1756.

The church organ was made in Denmark in 1958–1959 and it has 32 registers.

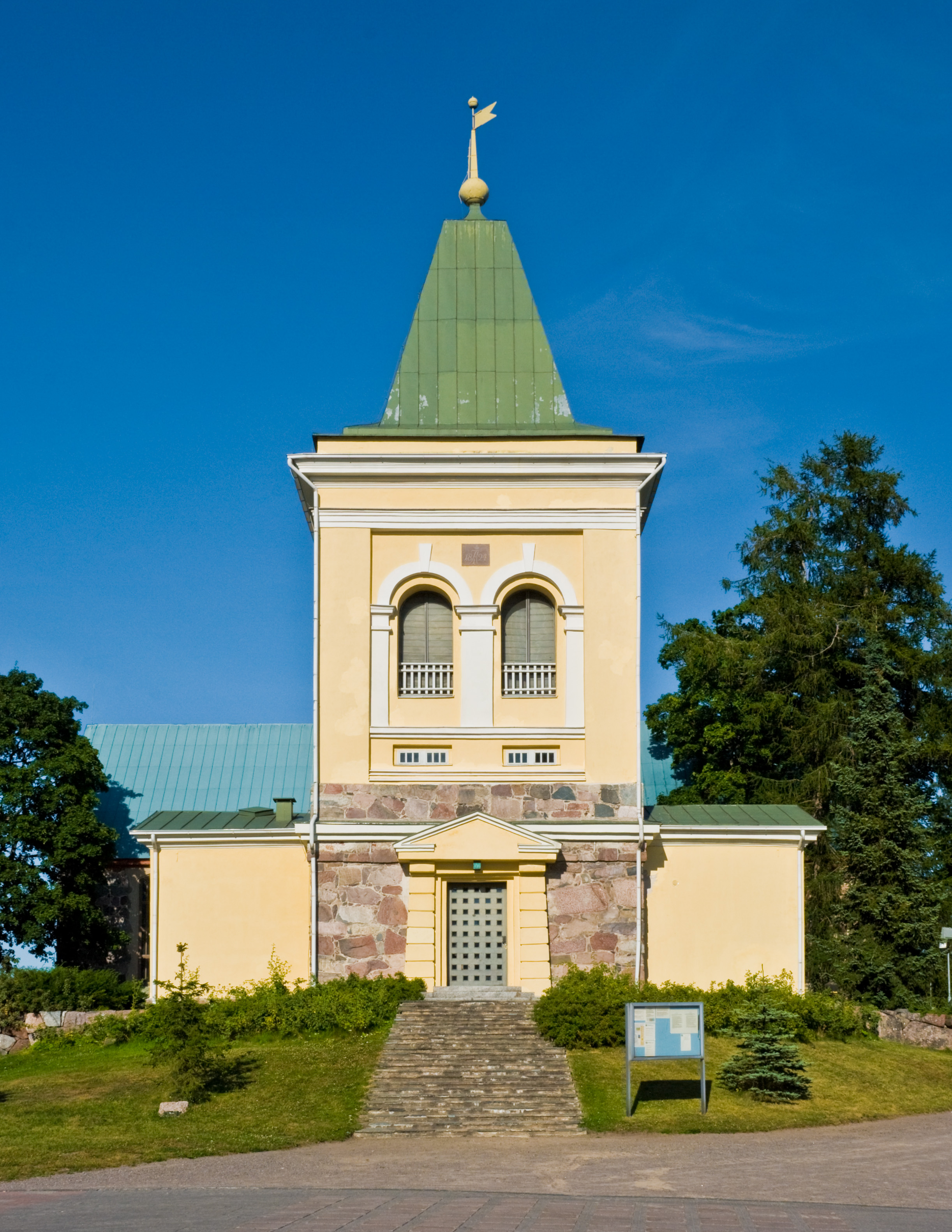
The bell tower

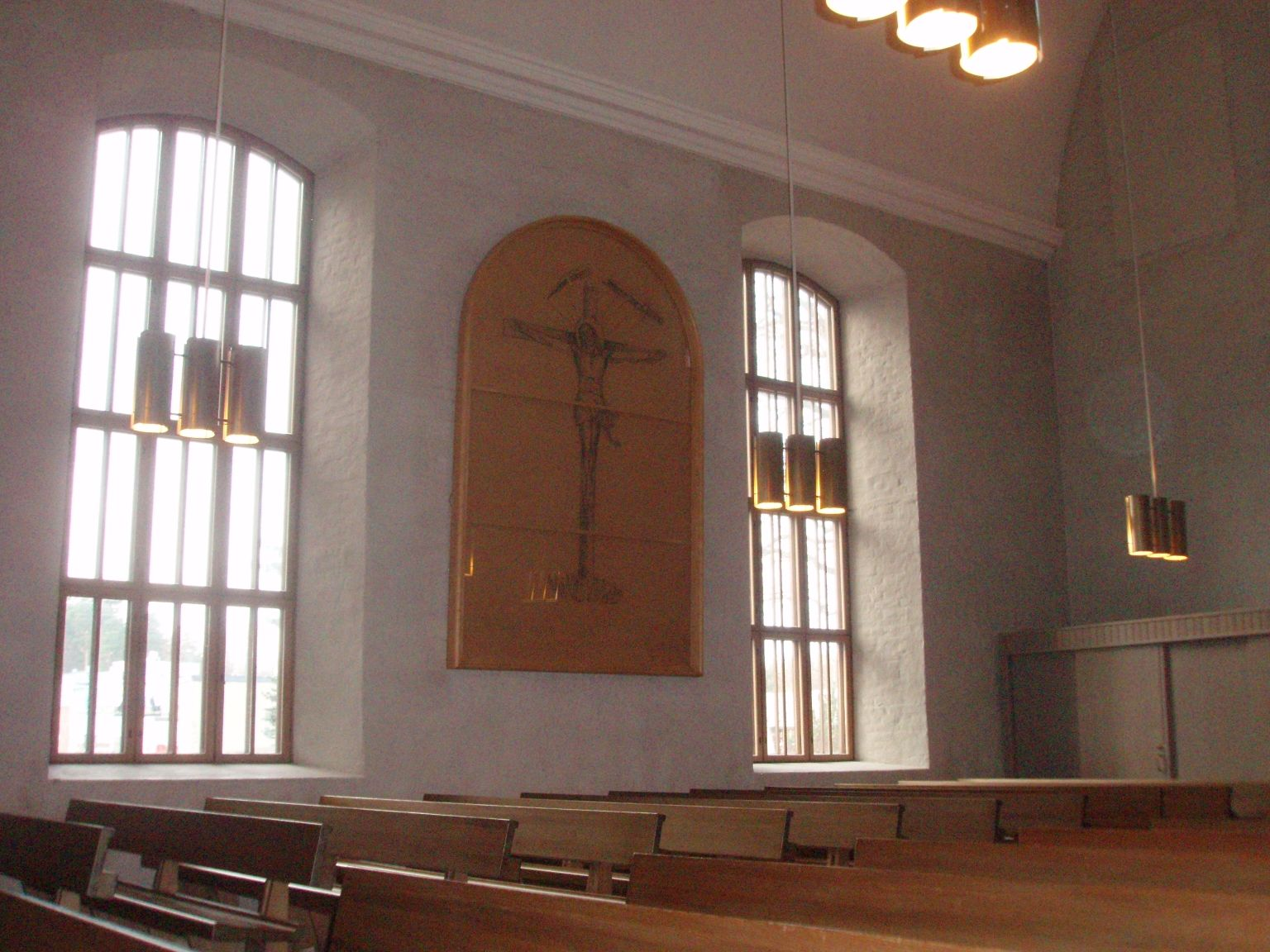
Drawing by Lennart Segerstråle

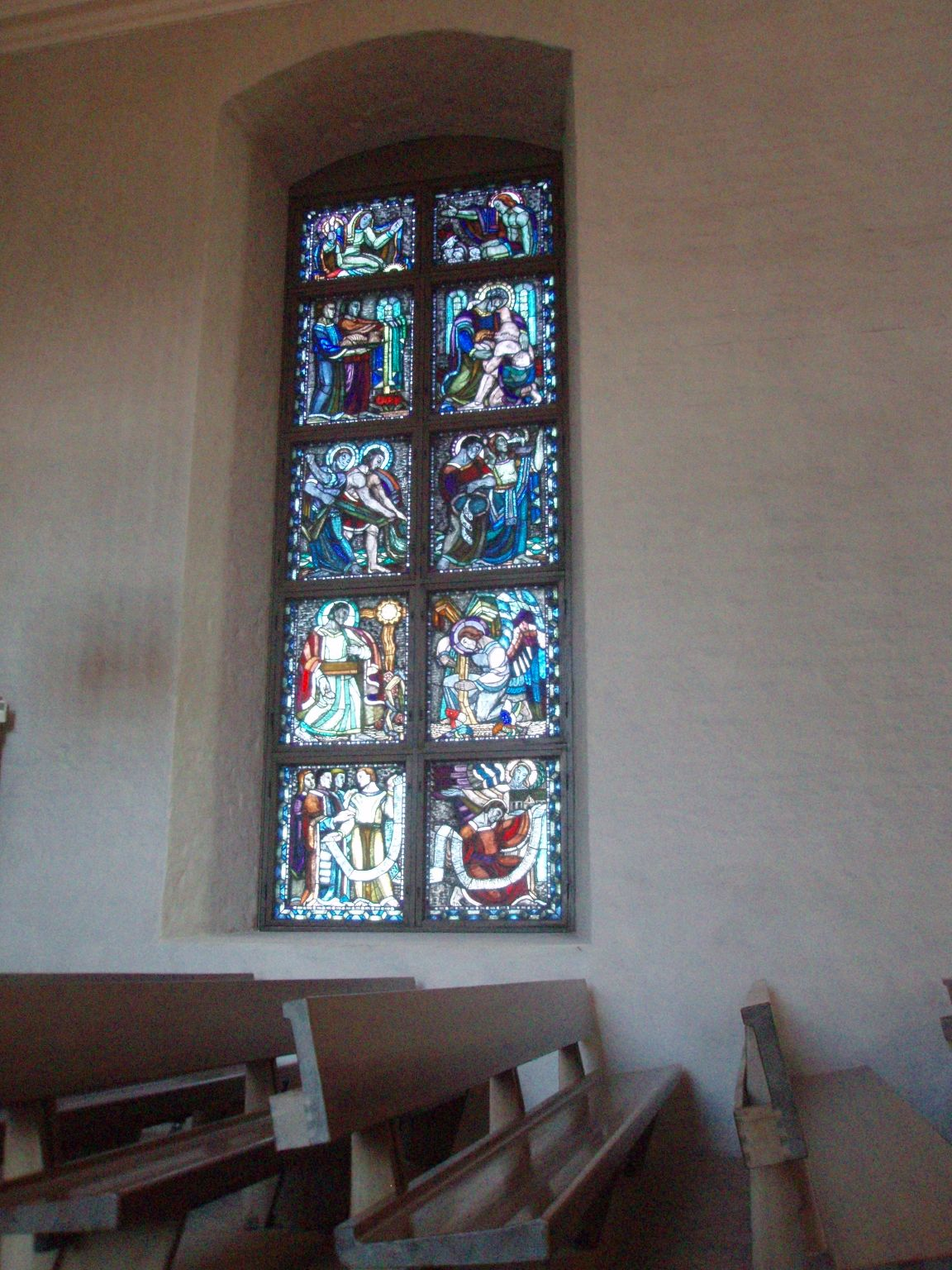
Painted glass window

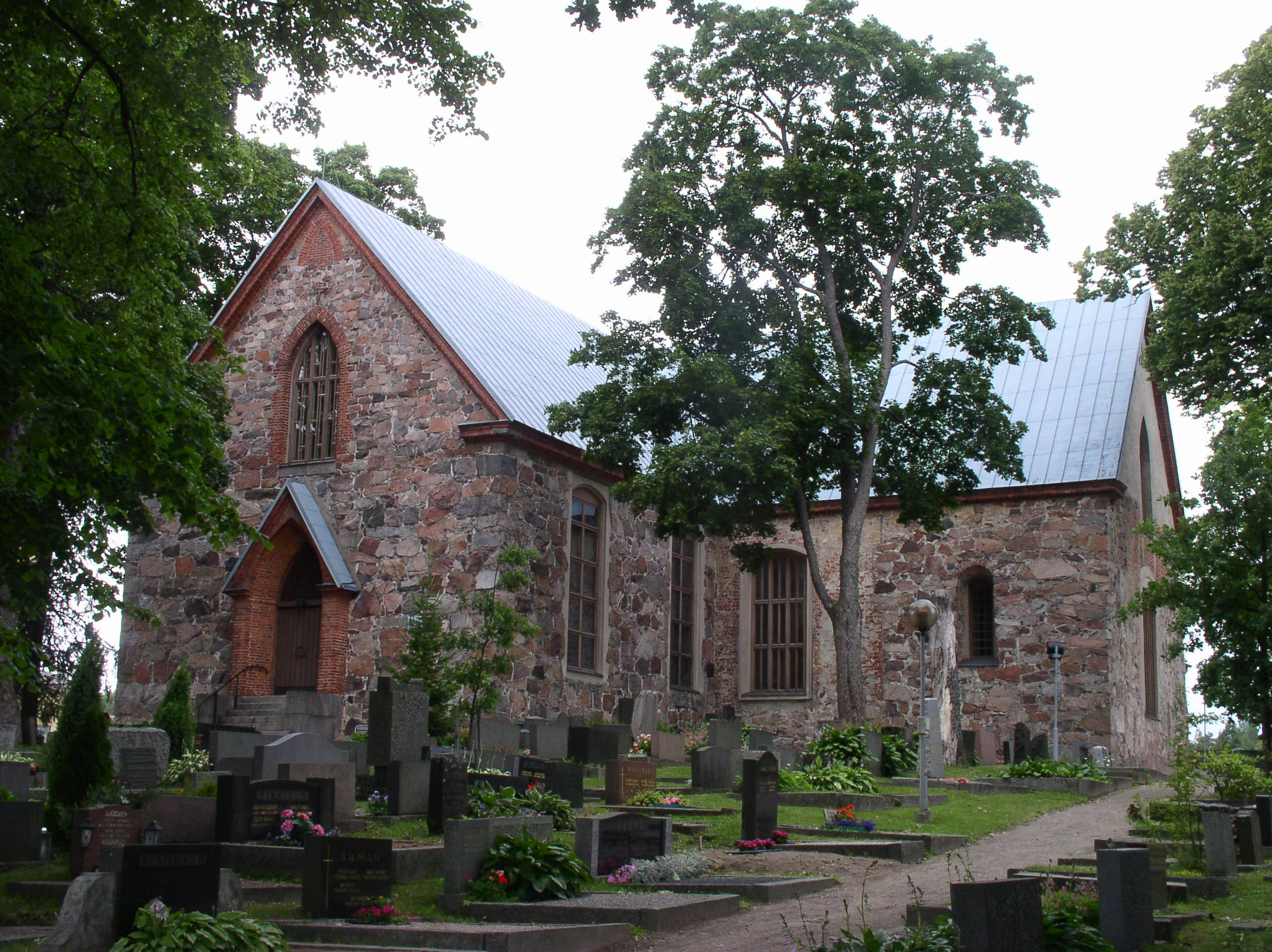
Church and the surrounding graveyard

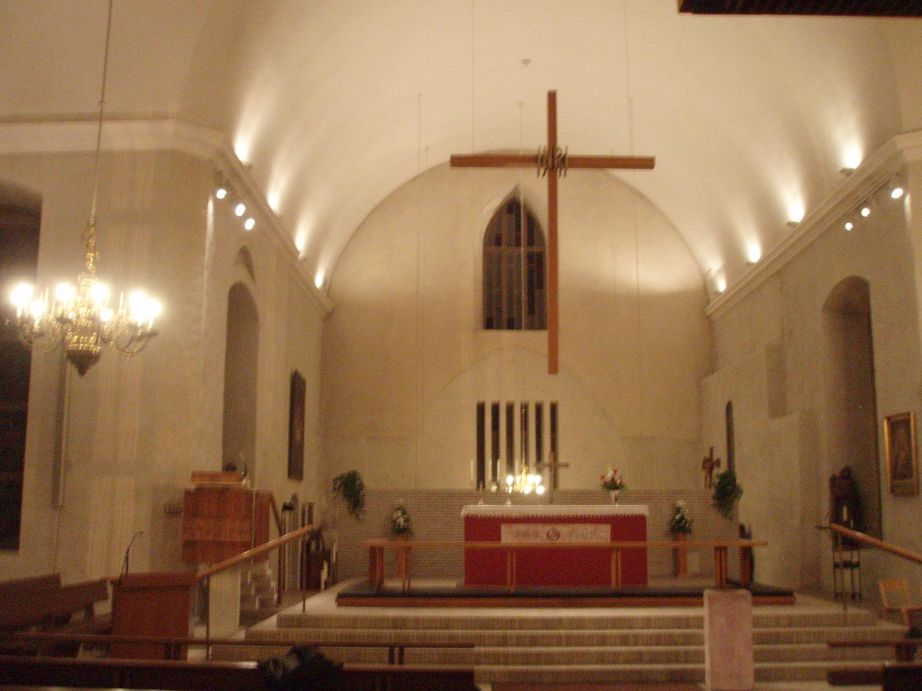
The main altar

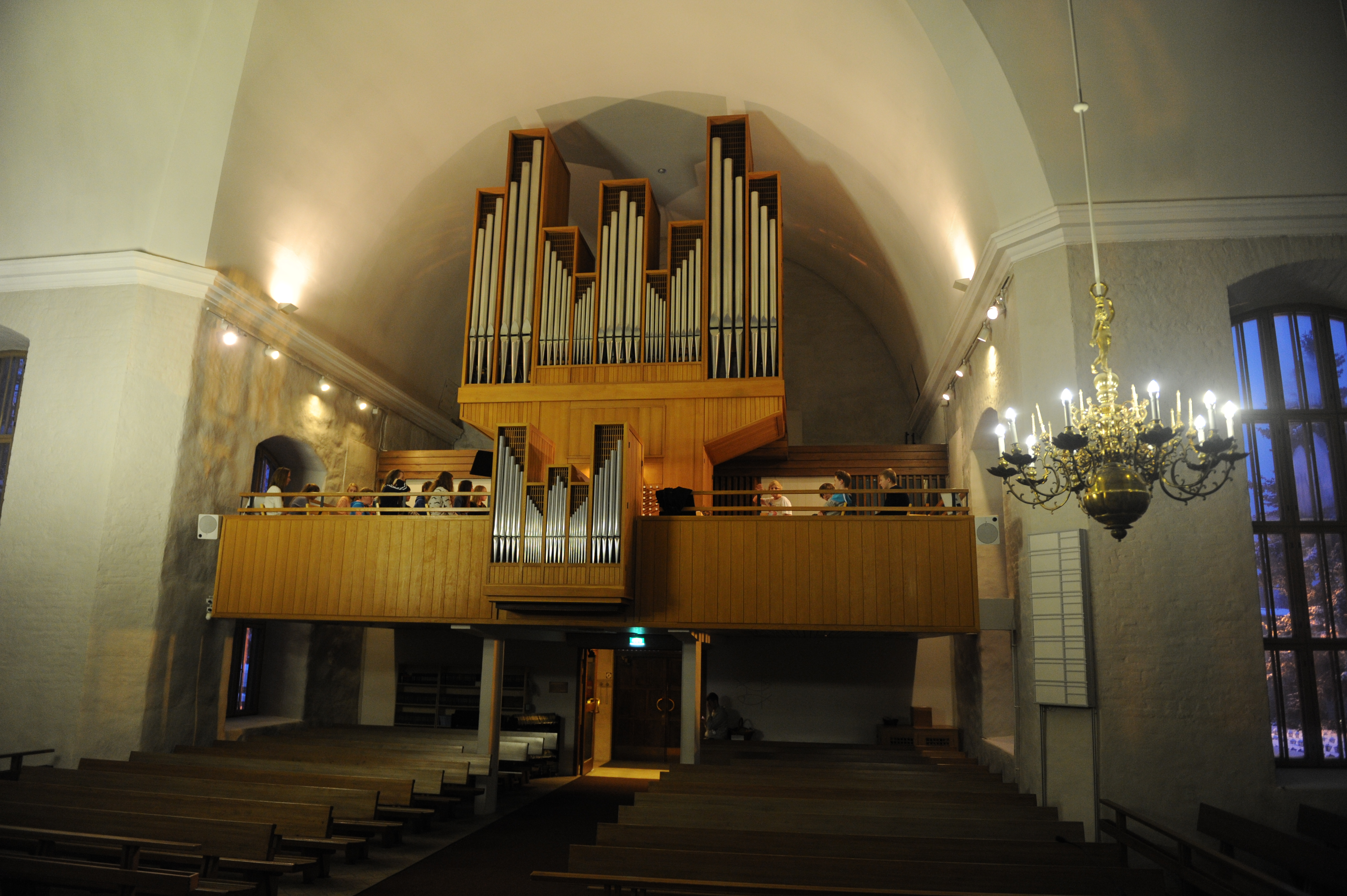
The organ made in Denmark

== See also ==
- Kirkkonummi
- St. Peter's Church in Siuntio
- Porkkala Naval Base
- Evangelical Lutheran Church of Finland
- Diocese of Espoo
- Diocese of Borgå
