= Muijala =

- District of Lohja
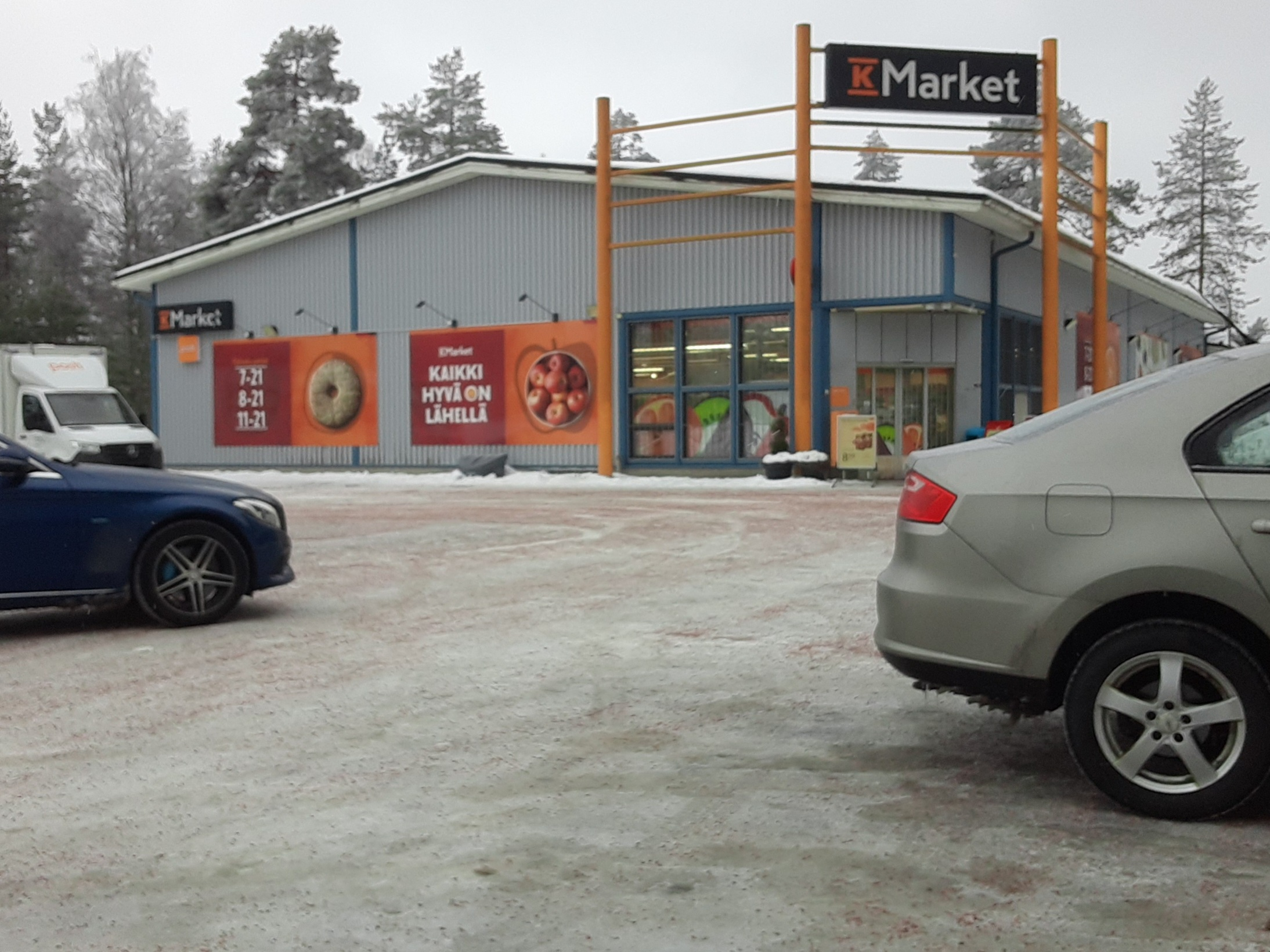
- K-Market Lohjanportti in Muijala
- Interactive map of Muijala
- Coordinates: 60°17.20′N 24°11.43′E
- Country: Finland
- Region: Uusimaa
- Sub-region: Greater Helsinki (formerly Lohja sub-region)
- City: Lohja

Muijala (Finnish: [ˈmui̯jɑlɑ]) is a district in Lohja, Finland. It is located northeast of the city center of Lohja along the connecting road 1125 and the Hyvinkää–Karjaa railway between the Turku Highway (Vt 1; E18) and the Hanko Highway (Vt 25). The driving time from Muijala to Helsinki along the Turku highway is about 45 minutes and buses run to Helsinki every 15-50 minutes during peak hours. The easternmost area of Muijala is an industrial area called Muijalannummi.

In the eastern parts of Muijala, near the Vihti border and its largest urban area Nummela, there is the grocery store K-market Lohjanportti, which also has a Posti and Veikkaus services (formerly also an ATM). There is a car shop (Kamux-Lohja) near the shop. There is also a primary school in Muijala, where there is teaching from 1 to 6. categories. The school also offers recreational opportunities for young people through clubs. Similarly, the residents' association has its own turns in the school hall, for example, to play floorball. The school field has a trough in winter and a football and beach volleyball court in summer. Behind the course in the woods is a five-lane disc golf course. To the north of Muijala School, across the Lohjanharjuntie road, you will find Muijala Ski Area, which has a cross-country ski run in winter and hiking trails for jogging in summer. Near Muijala you will find a pond called Nälköönlampi, which is a popular swimming place. In winter, the pond is open. Jogging trails towards the Muijala ski area start near the pond.

== See also ==
- Nummela (Vihti)
- Virkkala
