= Junkarsborg =

Coordinates: 60°09′12″N 23°47′10″E

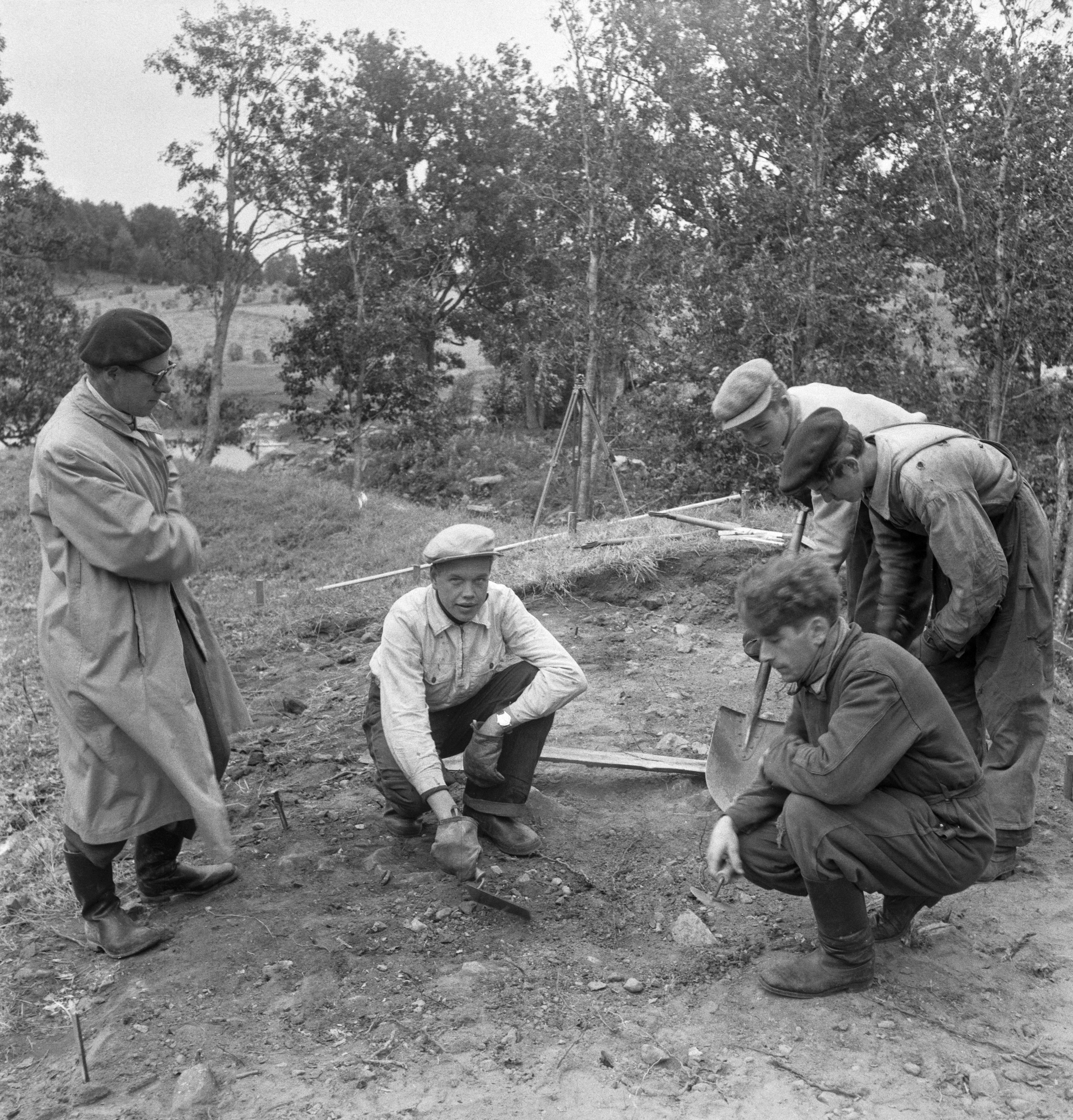
Excavations at Junkarsborg in 1952

Junkarsborg was a medieval castle in Karis, Raseborg, Finland. Today, only rectangular earth walls remain. Archaeologists suppose that the castle was built in the early 14th century and was used until the beginning of the 15th. It probably was a predecessor of the Castle of Raseborg only a few kilometers away. Some coins from late 14th century have been found. The site has been excavated 1891–92, 1937, and 1950–54.

The ruins are on a forested island in the middle of the Svartå river and can only be reached on foot. Some reconstruction work has been done during 2005–06 to improve the access to the island and its visual appearance.
