= Kantvik =

- Village
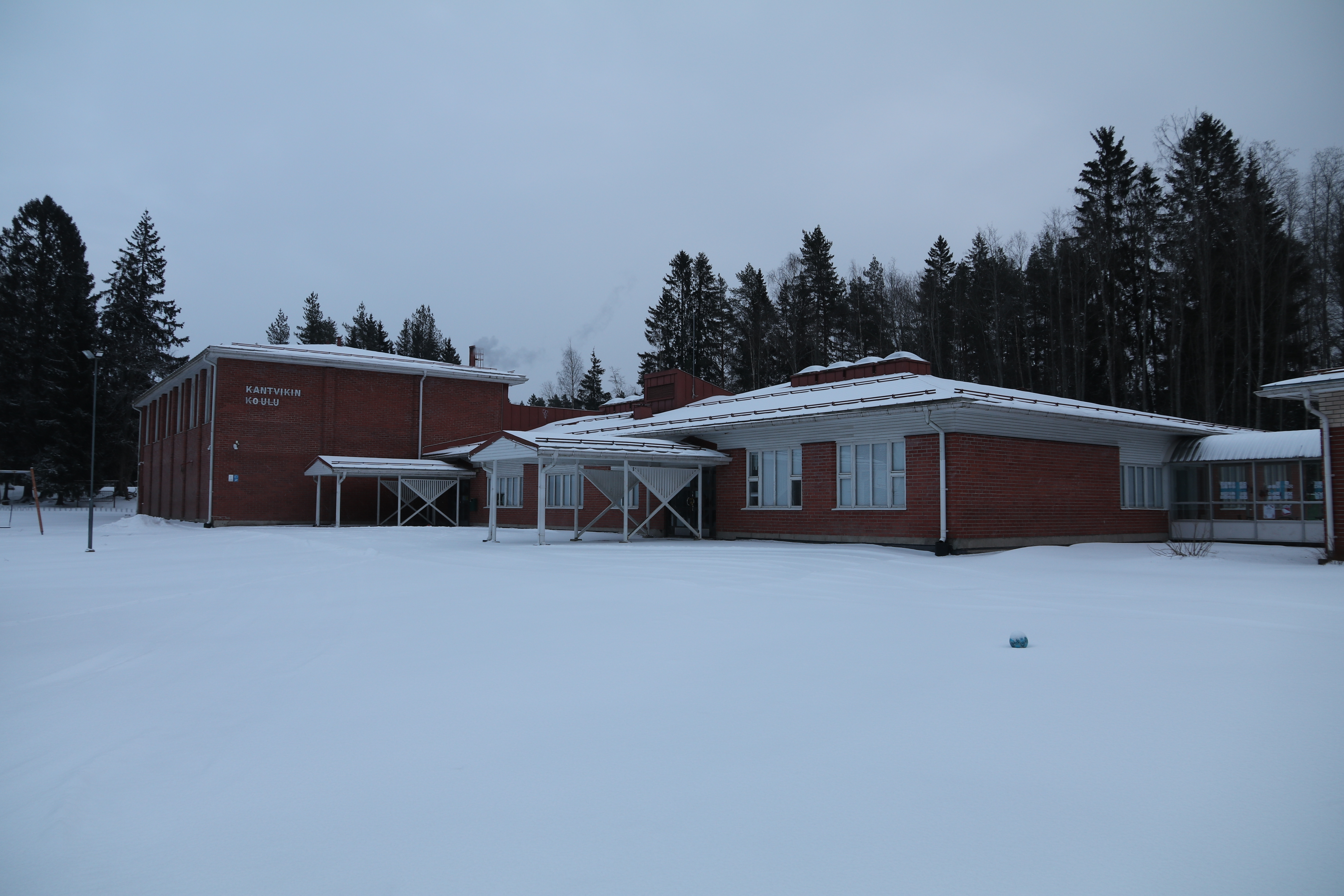
- Kantvik school

- Location within Uusimaa
- Country: Finland
- Region: Uusimaa
- Municipality: Kirkkonummi

Population (31 December 2021)
  - Total: 3,024
- Time zone: UTC+2 (EET)
  - Summer (DST): UTC+3 (EEST)
- Postal code: 02460

Kantvik is a village in Kirkkonummi municipality in Uusimaa, Finland. It is located about 5 kilometres (3.1 mi) south of the municipal center towards Upinniemi. Nearby services include a primary school and a Sale grocery store. There is a bus connection from Kantvik to the center of Kirkkonummi, such as lines 172, 173 and 904.

There is industry in Kantvik, such as the Suomen Sokeri sugar factory, and Mildola, which manufactures vegetable oil products. Kantvik has also two harbour areas, one of which, with an area of about five hectares, the Port of Helsinki manages.

== See also ==
- Upinniemi
