= Virkkala =

Virkkala Virkby
- District of Lohja
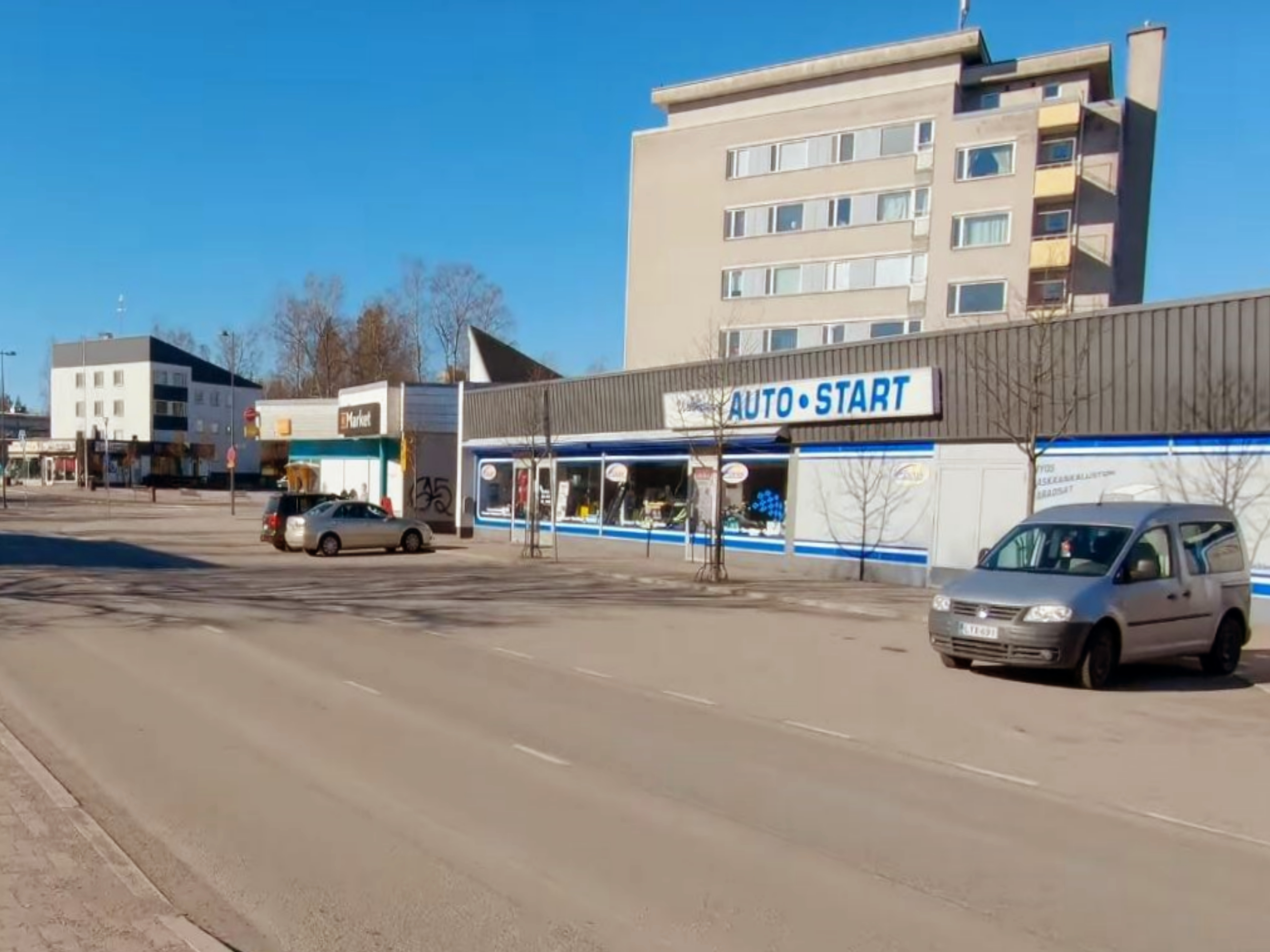
- Virkkala
- Interactive map of Virkkala
- Coordinates: 60°12.00′N 24°00.00′E
- Country: Finland
- Region: Uusimaa
- Sub-region: Greater Helsinki (formerly Lohja sub-region)
- City: Lohja
- Main District: South Lohja

Area
  - Total: 3,494 km^{2} (1,349 sq mi)

Population (12-31-2012)
  - Total: 7,536

Virkkala (Finnish: [ˈʋirkːɑlɑ]; Swedish: Virkby) is a district of Lohja, Finland, located about 8 kilometers southwest of the center of Lohja along Hanko Highway (Vt 25). Lake Lohja is located right next to Virkkala on its western side. The urban center of Virkkala has businesses as well as a library, pharmacy, and parish center. Most of the Swedish-speaking settlement in Lohja was concentrated in the Virkkala area.

Petter Forsström (1877–1967), vuorineuvos known as Kalkki-Petteri, gave the initial impetus to Virkkala's development. During the recession of the 1990s, Oy Lohja Ab was merged with Wärtsilä into Metra, which sold the plant to the Swedish Euroc Group. Euroc closed the plant in 1994. Today, the plant area is known as the Kalkkipetteri area, and there are dozens of small businesses.

The Rauhala and Risti primary schools are located in Virkkala, the Swedish-language Virkby School. Secondary schools include Järnefelt School (named after Arvid Järnefelt) and the Swedish-speaking Källhagens School. Virkkala is also home to the city’s only Swedish-language high school, the Virkby Gymnasium. Secondary schools and high schools also serve the residents of Siuntio, Ingå and Karjalohja within a radius of about 30 kilometers. A small animal clinic was opened in Virkkala in 2010, which has now moved to Tynninharju. Extensive renovation work on the city center began in Virkkala in the early 2010s, which stretched for several years, leading to business closures and significantly reducing parking spaces.

The Virkkala Church of the Lohja Parish was designed by architect Mikael Nordenswan and was completed in 1953. The Kässä Culture House and the protected Pähkinäniemi grove area with a nature trail are also located in Virkkala. The dance hall in the area burned down in the winter of 2015.

== See also ==
- Ingå
- Karis
- Muijala
- Siuntio
