= Porkkala Naval Base =

Former Soviet naval base in Uusimaa, Finland

- Порккала
- Porkkalanniemi in Finland
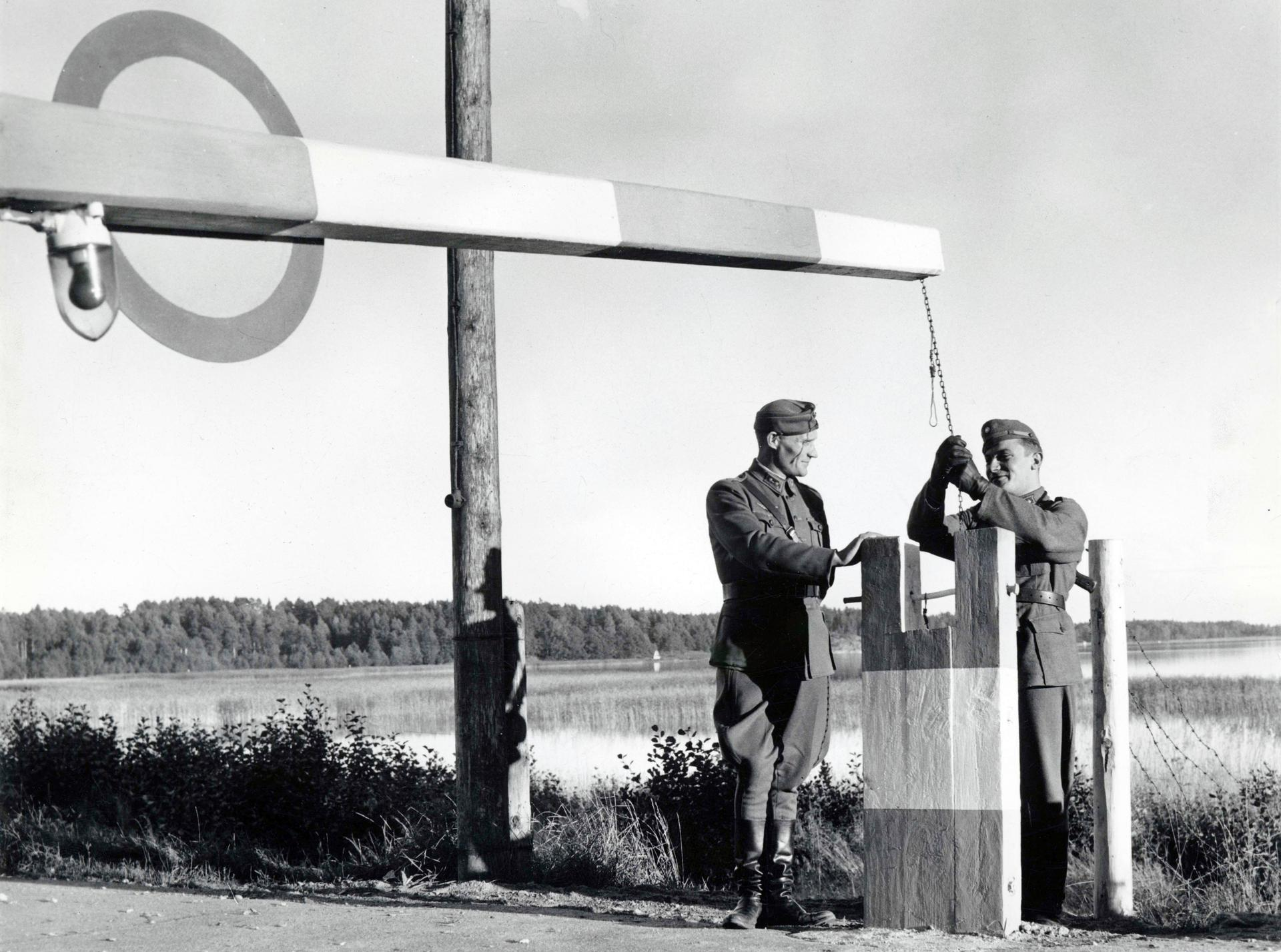
- Finnish border post bordering Porkkala Naval Base

Site information
- Owner: Soviet Union
- Operator: Soviet Navy

Location
- Location in Finland
- Coordinates: 59°59′N 24°26′E

Site history
- Built: 1945
- In use: 1956
- Fate: closed

Garrison information
- Garrison: Baltic Fleet

Porkkala Naval Base was a Soviet naval base operational from 1944–1956 in the municipalities of Kirkkonummi, Ingå and Siuntio on the Porkkala peninsula, 30 kilometers (19 mi) west of Helsinki, Finland.

The area was leased to the Soviet Union according to the Moscow Armistice signed in 1944 by Finland, the Soviet Union, and the United Kingdom. The area was returned to Finland in 1956. In the 21st century, it is the site of the Finnish naval base Upinniemi.

== History ==
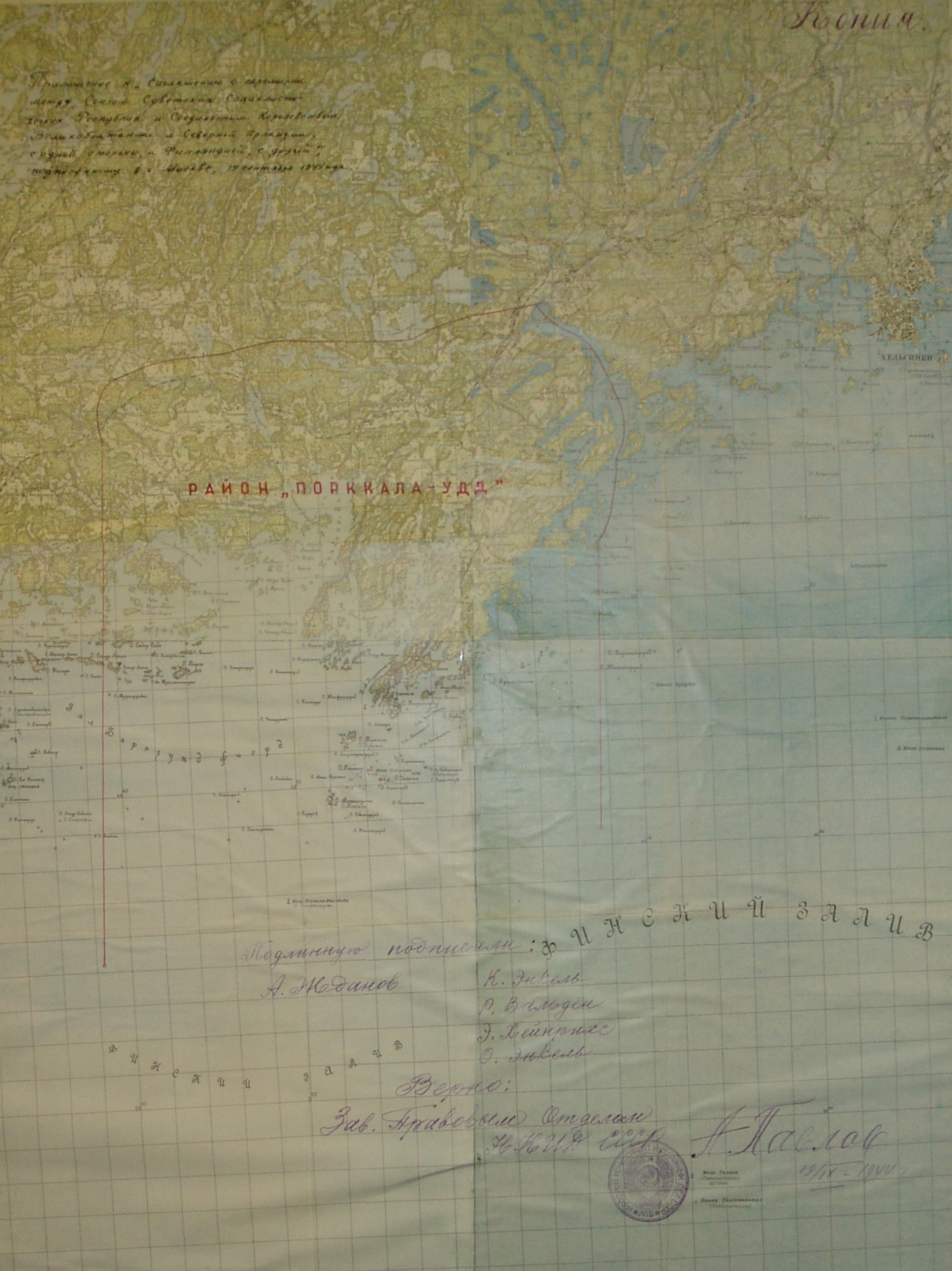
Porkkala Naval Base location on a map

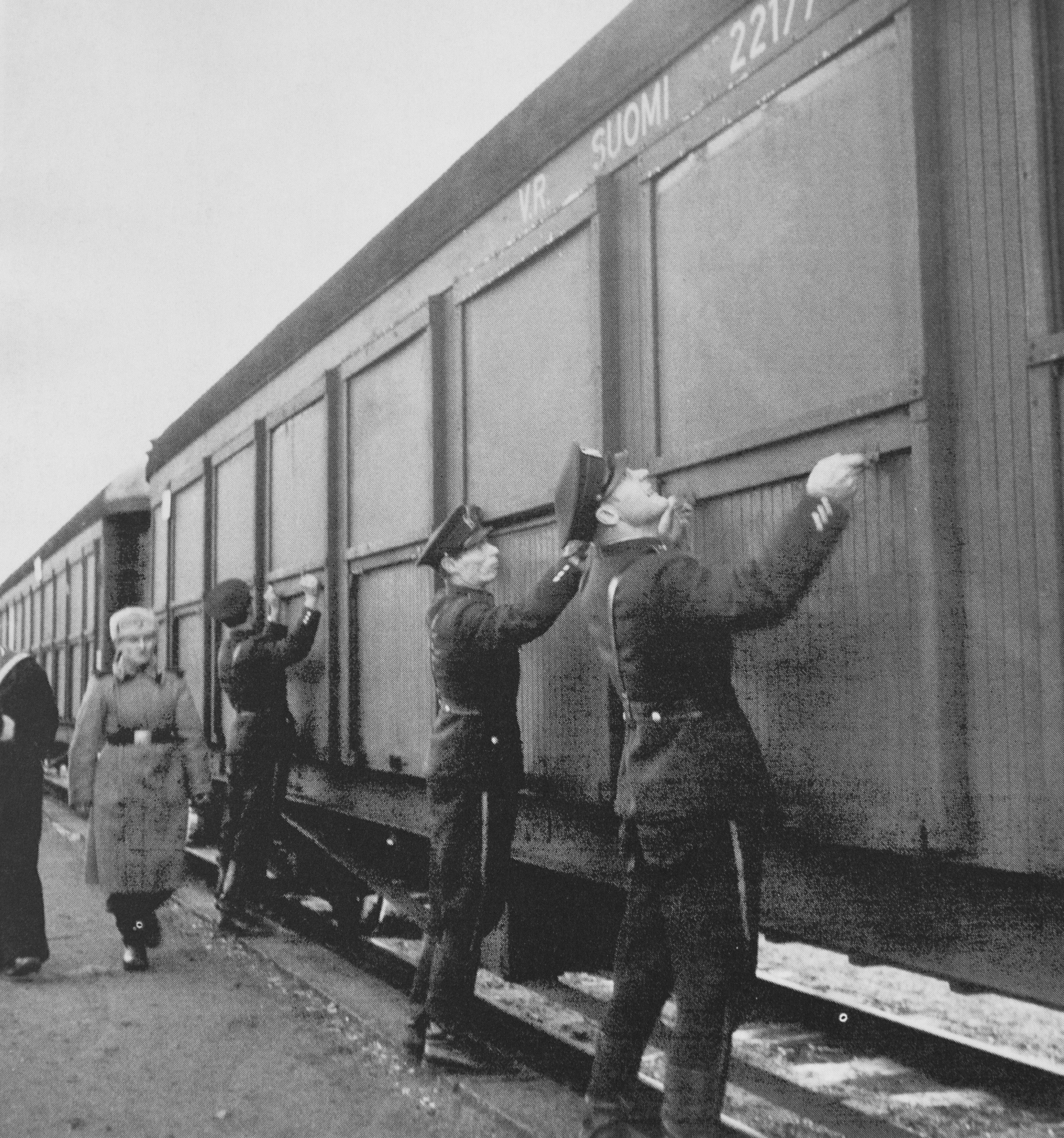
The train windows are covered at Kauklahti station before traveling through the Porkkala leased naval area

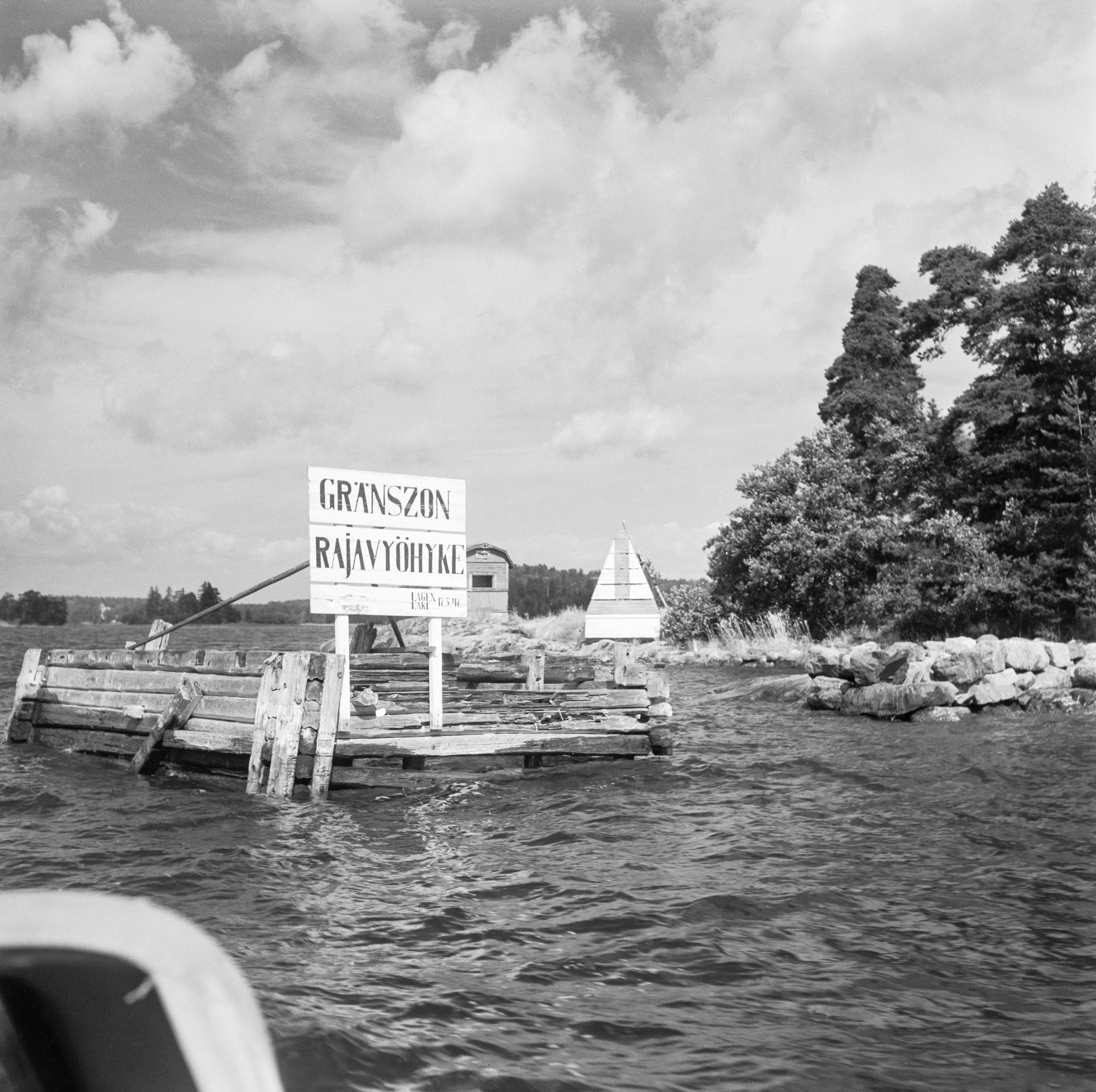
1953 Porkkala border zone between Finland and Soviet Union

At the end of the Second World War, the Soviet Union secured the rights of lease to a naval base at Porkkala, in accordance with the Moscow Armistice agreement that ended the Continuation War, between Finland and the Soviets on September 19, 1944. Porkkala replaced the peninsula of Hanko as a site of Soviet naval operations; the latter had been leased to the Soviets in 1940–41.

Ten days after the armistice, the USSR on 29 September 1944 leased a large area centered on the peninsula, including land from the municipalities of Kirkkonummi, Siuntio and Ingå and almost the entire area of Degerby. It was immediately placed under a military commander, Neon Vasilyevich Antonov (1907–1948), who remained in office until June 1945. He was transferred to command the Amur River flotilla, in preparation for the war against Japan.

On 1 November 1944, the headquarters and other assets of the 55th Rifle Division were converted into the 1st Mozyr Red Banner Naval Infantry Division of the Baltic Fleet at Oranienbaum. Its subordinate units were renumbered. The 107th Rifle Regiment became the 1st Regiment, the 111th Rifle Regiment became the 2nd Regiment, and the 228th became the 3rd Regiment. The 185th Tank Regiment became the 1st Tank Regiment and the 84th Artillery became the 1st Artillery. The division formed the garrison of the Porkkala Naval Base.

In 1948, postwar changes were made: the division became the 1st Machine Gun Artillery Division of the Soviet Baltic Fleet. The 1st Regiment became the 51st Machine Gun Artillery Regiment, the 2nd Regiment the 54th, and the 3rd Regiment the 57th. The 1st Tank Regiment was renumbered as the 194th and the 1st Artillery was renumbered as the 414th. The 53rd and 60th Machine Gun Artillery Regiments were added to the division after being formed from ground units. The division included 16,000 soldiers, occupying 280 machine gun and 208 artillery bunkers. In 1955, Finland began negotiations for a Soviet withdrawal, and the division began disbanding in August 1955. The process was completed in January 1956, when what remained of the division was disbanded at the Bobochinsky Camp in the Leningrad Military District.

According to the armistice of 1944, the area was leased to the Soviet Union for 50 years. On February 10, 1947, the Paris peace treaty reaffirmed the Soviet Union's right to occupy this area until 1994.

No Soviet civilian administration was set up; the USSR simply administered it through the military commander of Porkkala. This post was held from June 1945 until 26 January 1956 by Sergey Ivanovich Kabanov (1901–1973), the former Commander of Hanko naval base.

Beginning in 1947, Finnish passenger trains running between Helsinki and Turku were allowed to use the line through the area, on the condition that all train windows had to be closed with shutters and that the trains be pulled by Soviet engines with Soviet crews during the transit. Photography was prohibited during the transit.

Although Finland had conceded the Soviet lease for Porkkala for 50 years, the two nations reached an agreement for it to be returned earlier. The agreement was signed on September 19, 1955, exactly 11 years after the armistice. The Soviet Union transferred control of the area back to Finland on January 26, 1956. This may be attributed to the Finno-Soviet Treaty of 1948, the conditions of which made the naval base unnecessary.

At present, the Porkkala area houses one of the main bases of the Finnish Navy, located in Upinniemi, near Porkkala proper.

== Sources ==
- Feskov, V.I.; Golikov, V.I.; Kalashnikov, K.A.; Slugin, S.A. (2013). Вооруженные силы СССР после Второй Мировой войны: от Красной Армии к Советской [The Armed Forces of the USSR after World War II: From the Red Army to the Soviet: Part 1 Land Forces] (in Russian). Tomsk: Scientific and Technical Literature Publishing. ISBN 9785895035306.
