= Ojakkala =

Village in the Vihti municipality, Finland

Coordinates: 60.37022°N 24.39896°E

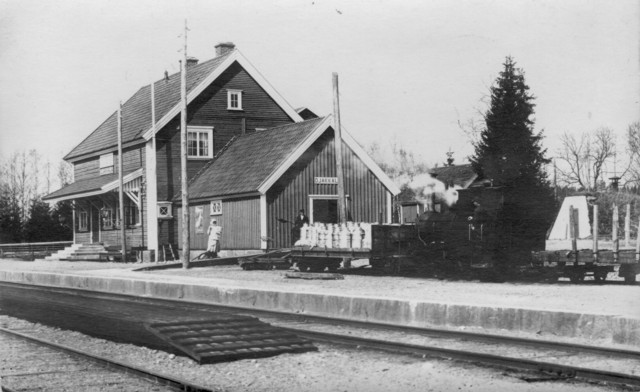
Old railway station in Ojakkala before 1960s.

Ojakkala is a village in the Vihti municipality, 45 kilometers from Helsinki, Finland. The administrative center of Vihti municipality, Nummela, is located 6 kilometres (3.7 mi) southwest of Ojakkala. Next to village is Enäjärvi. The population of Ojakkala is about 2,500. Ojakkala's services include, among other things, a primary school (Ojakkalan koulu) and the K-Market grocery store. There is also a historic sports hall (Ojakkalan urheilutalo) in the village, which currently serves as a venue for meetings and celebrations.

In Ojakkala, there is a ski resort Vihti Ski Center, a golf resort Vihti Golf Center and an amusement park PuuhaPark.

== See also ==
- Veikkola
- Tervalampi
