= Kirkkonummen keskusta =

Kirkkonummen keskusta Swedish: Kyrkslätts centrum
- Village
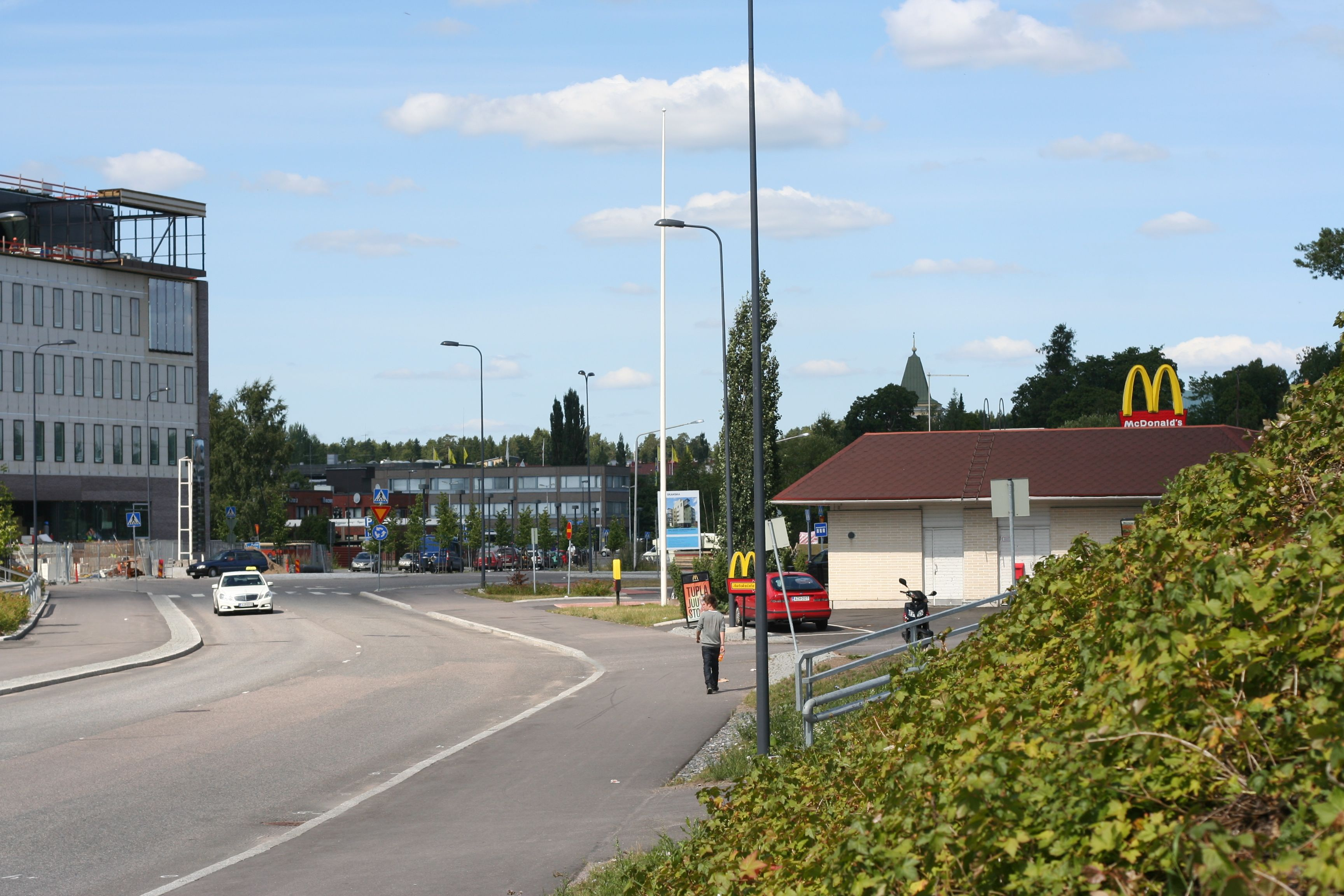
- The town centre of Kirkkonummi in 2011. On the left, the town hall under construction, behind McDonald's the bell tower of St. Michael's Church.

- Location within Uusimaa
- Coordinates: 60°07′25″N 24°26′20″E
- Country: Finland
- Region: Uusimaa
- Municipality: Kirkkonummi

Population (31 December 2022)
  - Total: 20,464
- Time zone: UTC+2 (EET)
  - Summer (DST): UTC+3 (EEST)

Kirkkonummen keskusta (Swedish: Kyrkslätts centrum; lit. 'Kirkkonummi's centre') is the urban area and administrative centre of the Kirkkonummi municipality in Uusimaa, Finland. It has been built approximately in the middle of the municipality, along the Rantarata railway and the Highway 51. In terms of population, it is the municipality's largest human settlement, where at the end of 2022, over 20,000 people lived, or about half of Kirkkonummi's entire population.

Most of Kirkkonummi municipality's services are also located in the area of the town centre; at the end of the 1990s, a McDonald's restaurant and the municipality's first Prisma hypermarket were opened in the centre.

== See also ==
- Kirkkonummi railway station
- Kantvik
- Masala, Kirkkonummi
- Veikkola
