= Nummela (Vihti) =

- Urban area
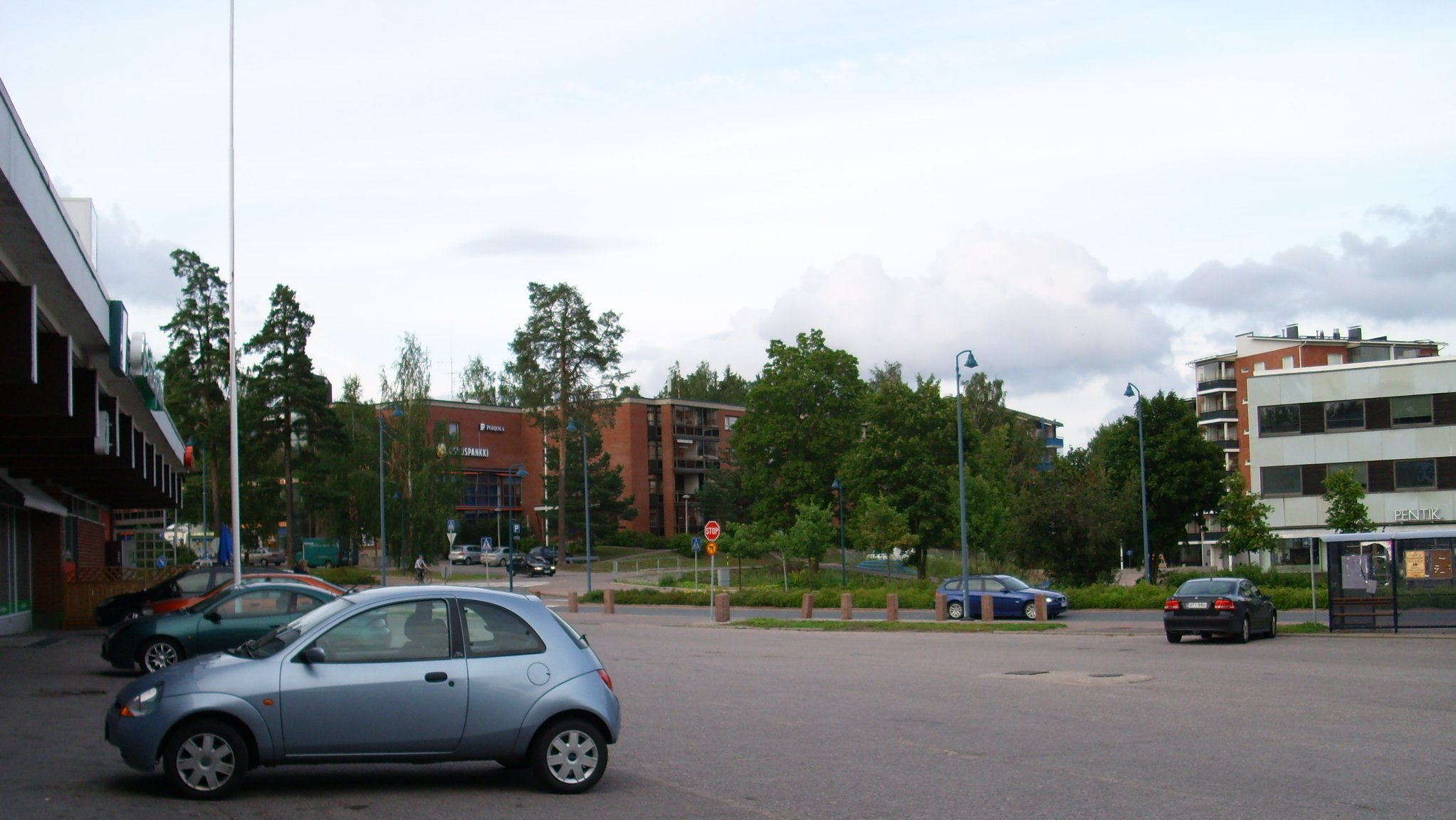

- Location within Uusimaa
- Coordinates: 60°20′02″N 24°19′14″E
- Country: Finland
- Region: Uusimaa
- Municipality: Vihti
- Postal code: 03100

Nummela (Finnish pronunciation: [ˈnumːelɑ]) is the largest urban agglomeration and municipality seat of Vihti municipality in Southern Finland. Nummela is located in a triangle between highways 1, 2 and 25, 44 kilometres (27 mi) northwest from the capital Helsinki, 19 kilometres (12 mi) northeast from the city of Lohja and 6 kilometres (3.7 mi) southwest from Ojakkala, the third largest settlement in Vihti. Population of Nummela's urban area is around 13 500 and population within its post code is around 15 000.

Nummela has an airport (ICAO: EFNU) that is suitable for gliding. One of Microsoft's data centers, the Vihti Data Center, is planned for Nummela.

Nummela is home of the most accurate geodetic baseline in the world; it is 864 metres (2,835 ft) long and is used to make maps, bridges and dams, even in foreign countries.

== Famous people from Nummela ==
- Uma Aaltonen, writer
- Merikukka Forsius, politician
- Ella Kanninen, television presenter
- Vivi Friedman, film director
- Veikko Helle, politician
- Anssi Kela, singer
- Jani Lakanen, orienteering competitor
- Aleksi Mäkelä, film director
- Markus ”Zarkus” Poussa, musician
- Markus Selin, film producer
- Jani Sievinen, swimmer
- Eeli Tolvanen, ice hockey player

== Gallery ==
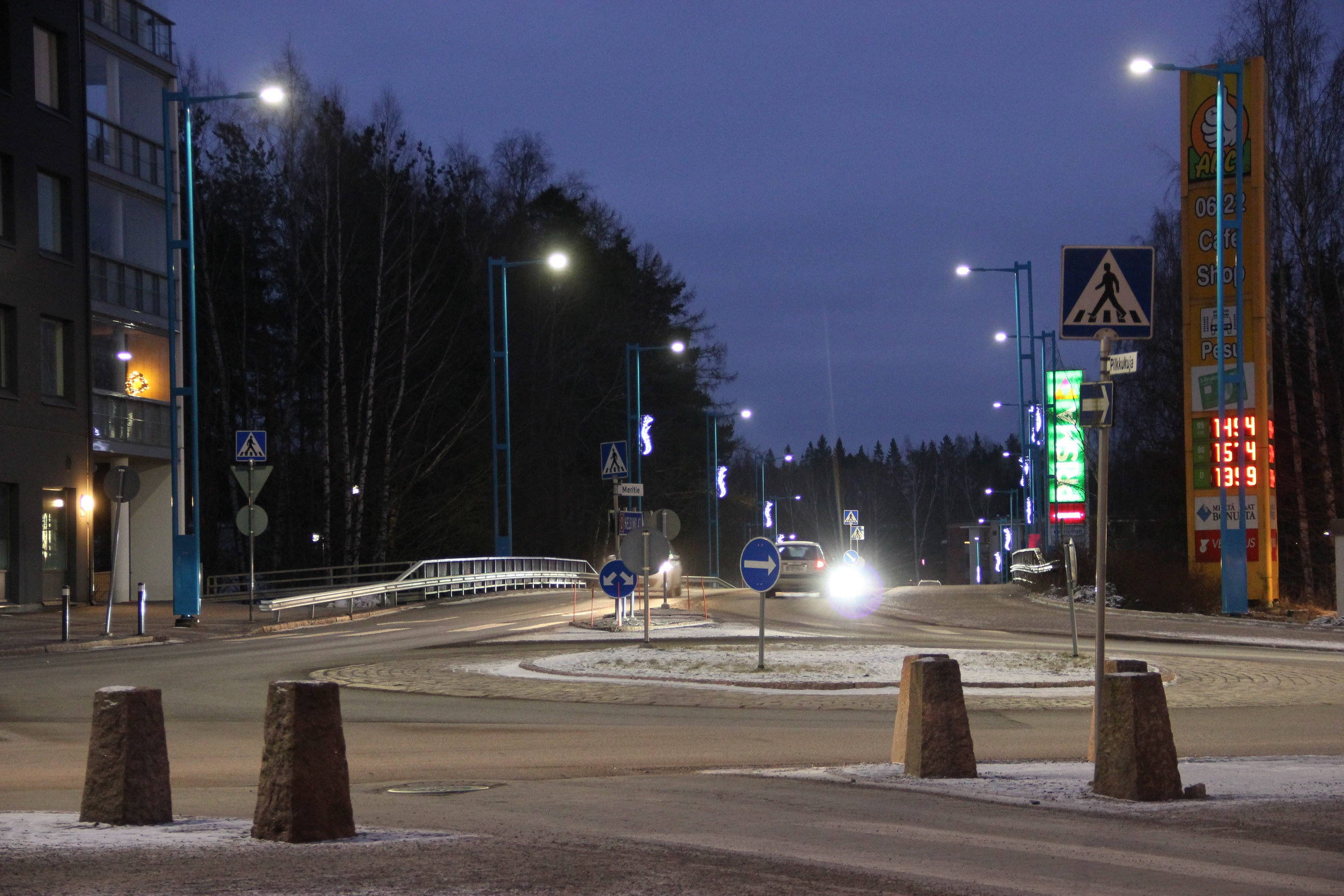
Center of Nummela at night.

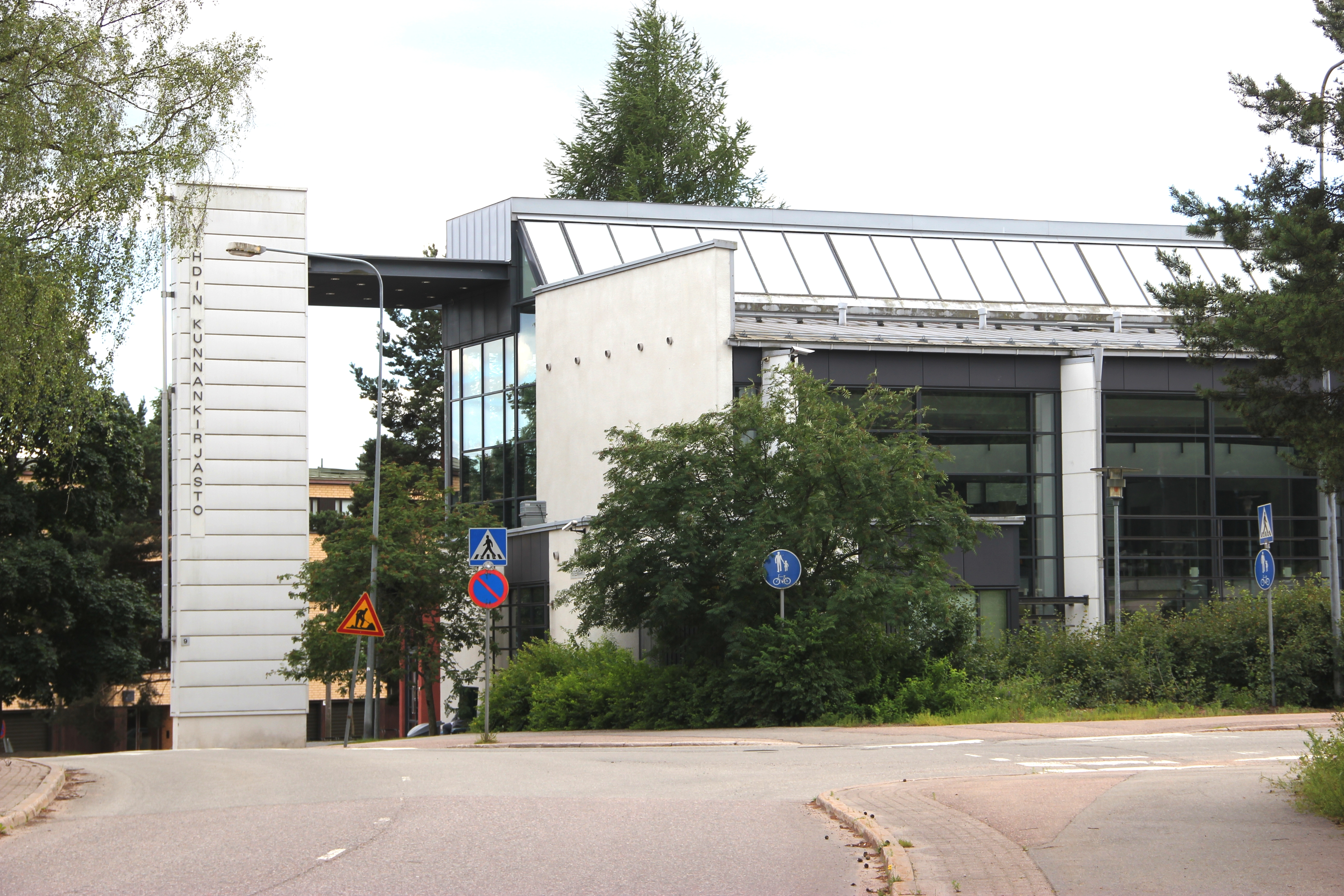
The seat of the main library of Vihti is in Nummela.

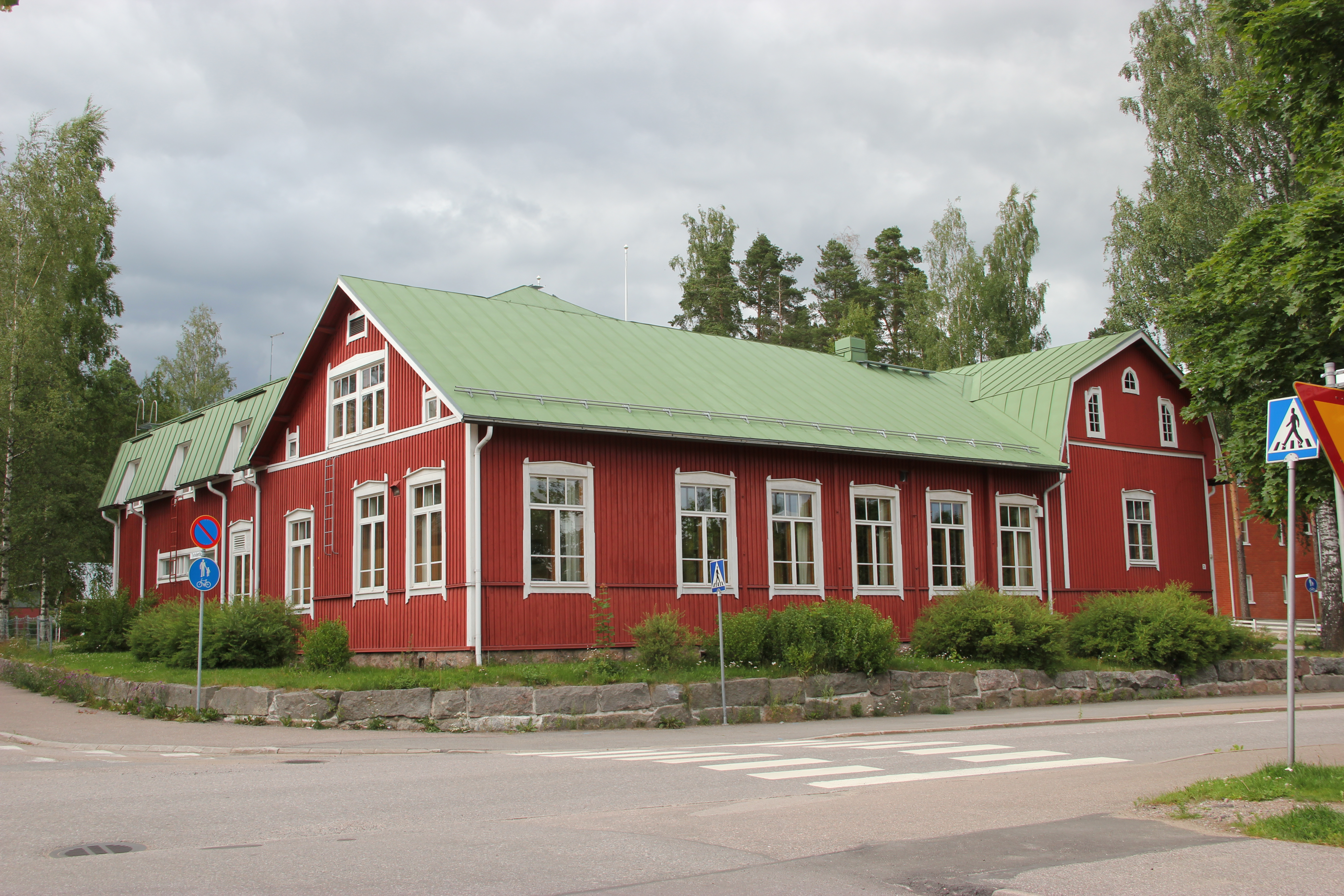
Rientola, the people's House in Nummela.

== See also ==
- Muijala
- Ojakkala
- Vihti (village)
