= Karis =

Town and former municipality in Uusimaa, Finland

Karis Karis – Karjaa
- Former town
- Karis stad Karjaan kaupunki
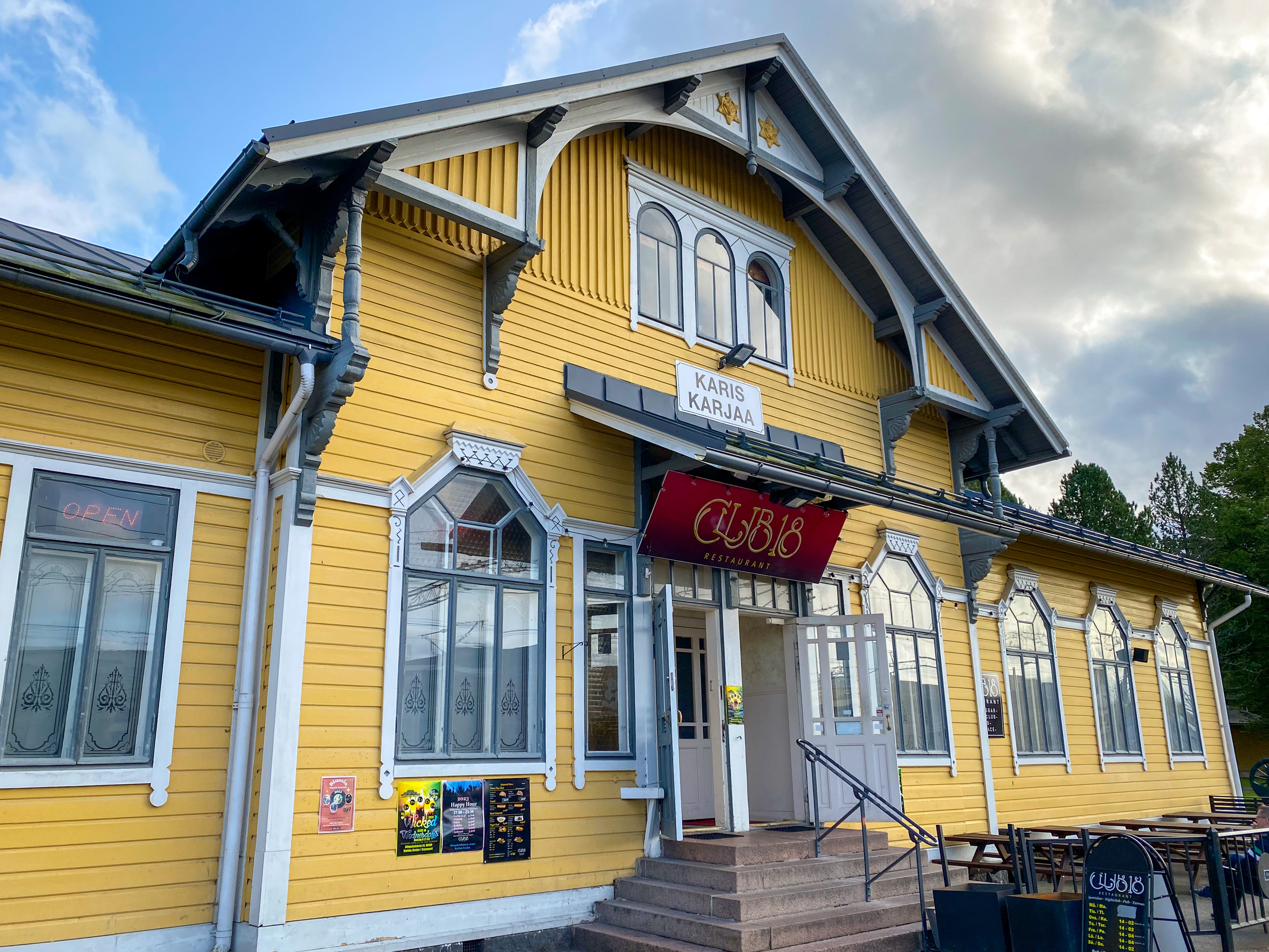
- Karis train station

- Coat of arms

- Location of Karis in Finland
- Interactive map of Karis
- Location within Uusimaa Location within Finland Location within Europe
- Coordinates: 60°04′15″N 023°39′45″E
- Country: Finland
- Region: Uusimaa
- Sub-region: Ekenäs sub-region
- Founded: 1930
- Town privileges: 1977
- Consolidated: 2009

Area
  - Total: 214.76 km^{2} (82.92 sq mi)
  - Land: 196.82 km^{2} (75.99 sq mi)
  - Water: 17.94 km^{2} (6.93 sq mi)

Population (2008-12-31)
  - Total: 9,155
  - Density: 46.51/km^{2} (120.5/sq mi)

Population by native language
  - Finnish: 38% (official)
  - Swedish: 59% (official)
- Time zone: UTC+2 (EET)
  - Summer (DST): UTC+3 (EEST)
- Climate: Dfb

Karis (Finland Swedish: [ˈkɑːris]; Finnish: Karjaa [ˈkɑrjɑː]) is a town and former municipality in Finland. On January 1, 2009, it was consolidated with Ekenäs and Pohja to form the new municipality of Raseborg (Finnish: Raasepori).

It is located in the Finnish province of Southern Finland and is part of Uusimaa, one of the regions of Finland. The town had a population of 9,155 (as of 31 December 2008) and covered a land area of 196.82 square kilometres (75.99 sq mi). The population density was 46.51 inhabitants per square kilometre (120.5/sq mi).

The municipality was bilingual, with a majority (59%) being Swedish language speakers and a minority (38%) being Finnish language speakers.

Karis railway station is on both the Rantarata line, connecting Helsinki Central railway station and Turku Central railway station; and on the Hanko–Hyvinkää railway where it is the junction station for branch line services to Hanko railway station. By driving along the national road 51 to Helsinki, the minimum distance is about 75 kilometers.

Stage magician Simo Aalto came from the town.

== See also ==
- Ingå
- Junkarsborg
- Virkkala
