= Kirkkonummi =

Municipality in Uusimaa, Finland

Kirkkonummi Kirkkonummi – Kyrkslätt
- Municipality
- Kirkkonummen kunta Kyrkslätts kommun
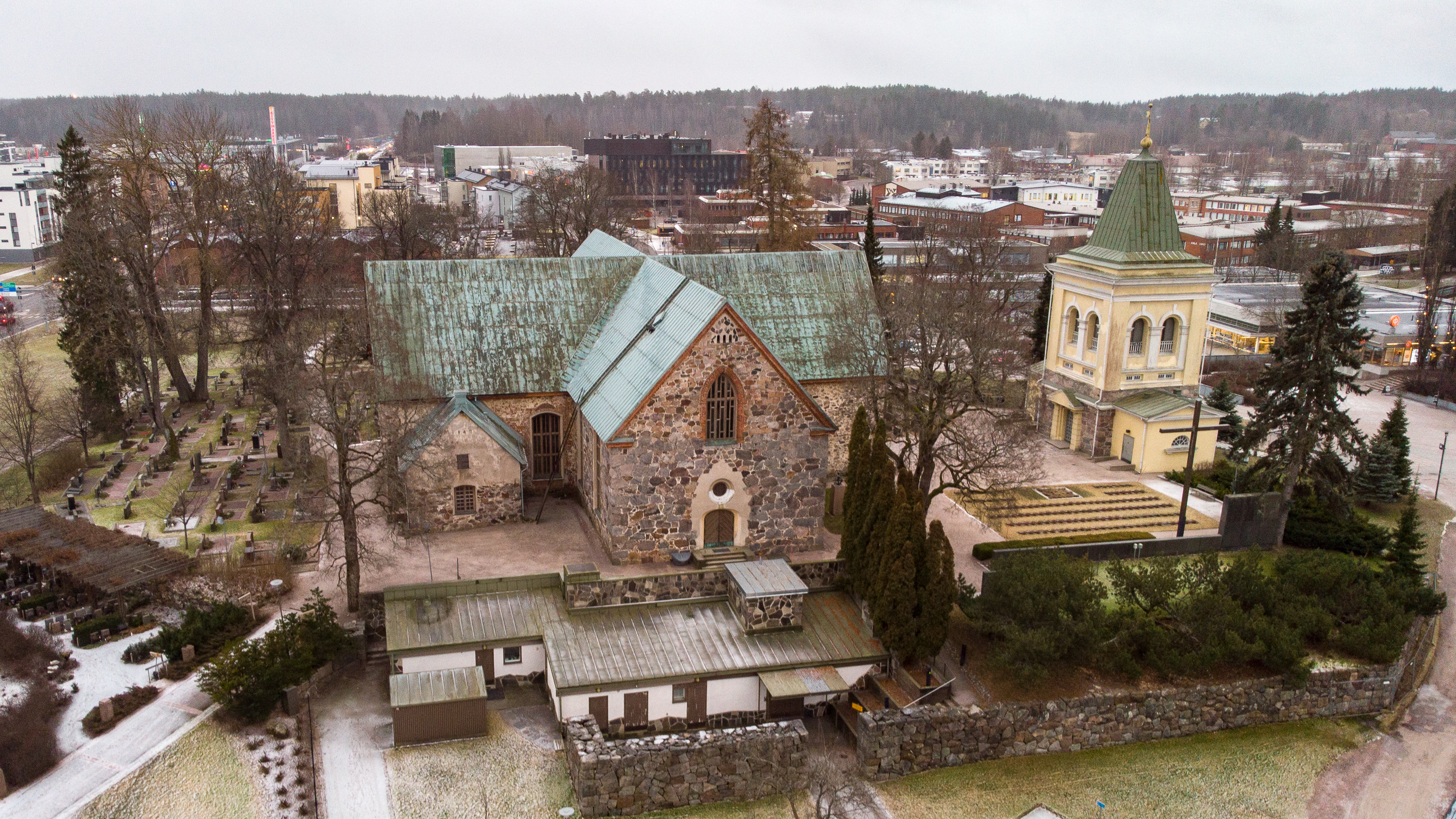
- Aerial view of St. Michael's Church in the municipal town centre.

- Coat of arms

- Location of Kirkkonummi in Finland
- Interactive map of Kirkkonummi
- Coordinates: 60°07′N 024°26′E
- Country: Finland
- Region: Uusimaa
- Sub-region: Helsinki sub-region
- Metropolitan area: Helsinki metropolitan area
- Charter: 1330
- Municipal manager: Tarmo Aarnio
- Seat: Kirkkonummen keskusta
- Villages: Masala, Veikkola

Area (2018-01-01)
  - Total: 1,017.01 km^{2} (392.67 sq mi)
  - Land: 366.6 km^{2} (141.5 sq mi)
  - Water: 649.91 km^{2} (250.93 sq mi)
  - Rank: 209th largest in Finland

Population (2025-12-31)
  - Total: 41,725
  - Rank: 28th largest in Finland
  - Density: 113.82/km^{2} (294.8/sq mi)

Population by native language
  - Finnish: 72.2% (official)
  - Swedish: 14.4% (official)
  - Others: 13.3%

Population by age
  - 0 to 14: 19%
  - 15 to 64: 64.1%
  - 65 or older: 16.9%
- Time zone: UTC+02:00 (EET)
  - Summer (DST): UTC+03:00 (EEST)
- Website: www.kirkkonummi.fi

Kirkkonummi (Finnish pronunciation: [ˈkirkːoˌnumːi]; Swedish: Kyrkslätt, Finland Swedish: [ˈtɕyrːkslet], Sweden Swedish: [ˈɕʏ̂rːkslɛt]) is a municipality in Finland, located in the southern coast of the country. Kirkkonummi is situated in the western part of the Uusimaa region. The population of Kirkkonummi is approximately 42,000. It is the 28th most populous municipality in Finland. Kirkkonummi is part of the Helsinki Metropolitan Area, which has approximately 1.62 million inhabitants.

Kirkkonummi is situated on the northern shore of the Gulf of Finland and borders Espoo, Vihti, Siuntio and Ingå. The literal translation of the Finnish name "Kirkkonummi" into English is "church heath"; the Swedish name "Kyrkslätt" translates to "church plain".

Kirkkonummi is a bilingual municipality with Finnish and Swedish as its official languages. The population consists of 72% Finnish speakers, 14% Swedish speakers, and 13% speakers of other languages.

== Geography ==
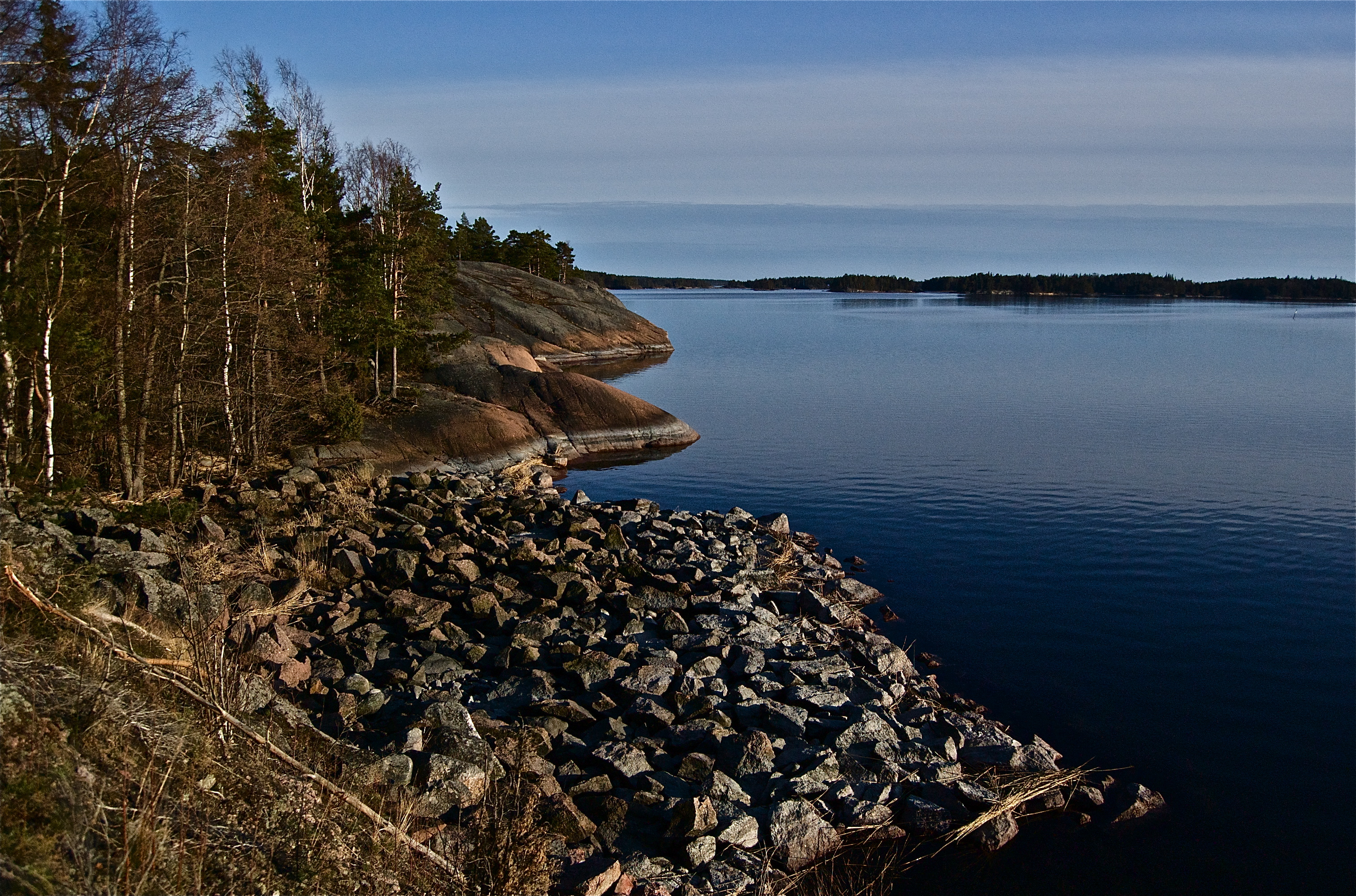
Gulf of Finland at Upinniemi

The municipality is located just outside the Helsinki Metropolitan Area, bordering the city of Espoo in the east. Other neighbouring municipalities are Vihti and Siuntio. The distance from the municipal centre to central Helsinki is some 30 kilometres (20 mi). Kirkkonummi also has excellent train and bus connections to other parts of the Greater Helsinki area, and many of its inhabitants commute daily to Helsinki.

The municipality covers an area of 1,017.01 square kilometres (392.67 sq mi) of which 649.91 km^{2} (250.93 sq mi) is water. The population density is 113.82 inhabitants per square kilometre (294.8/sq mi). In recent years, Kirkkonummi has faced the highest population growth rate in the country, at over 3% per annum.

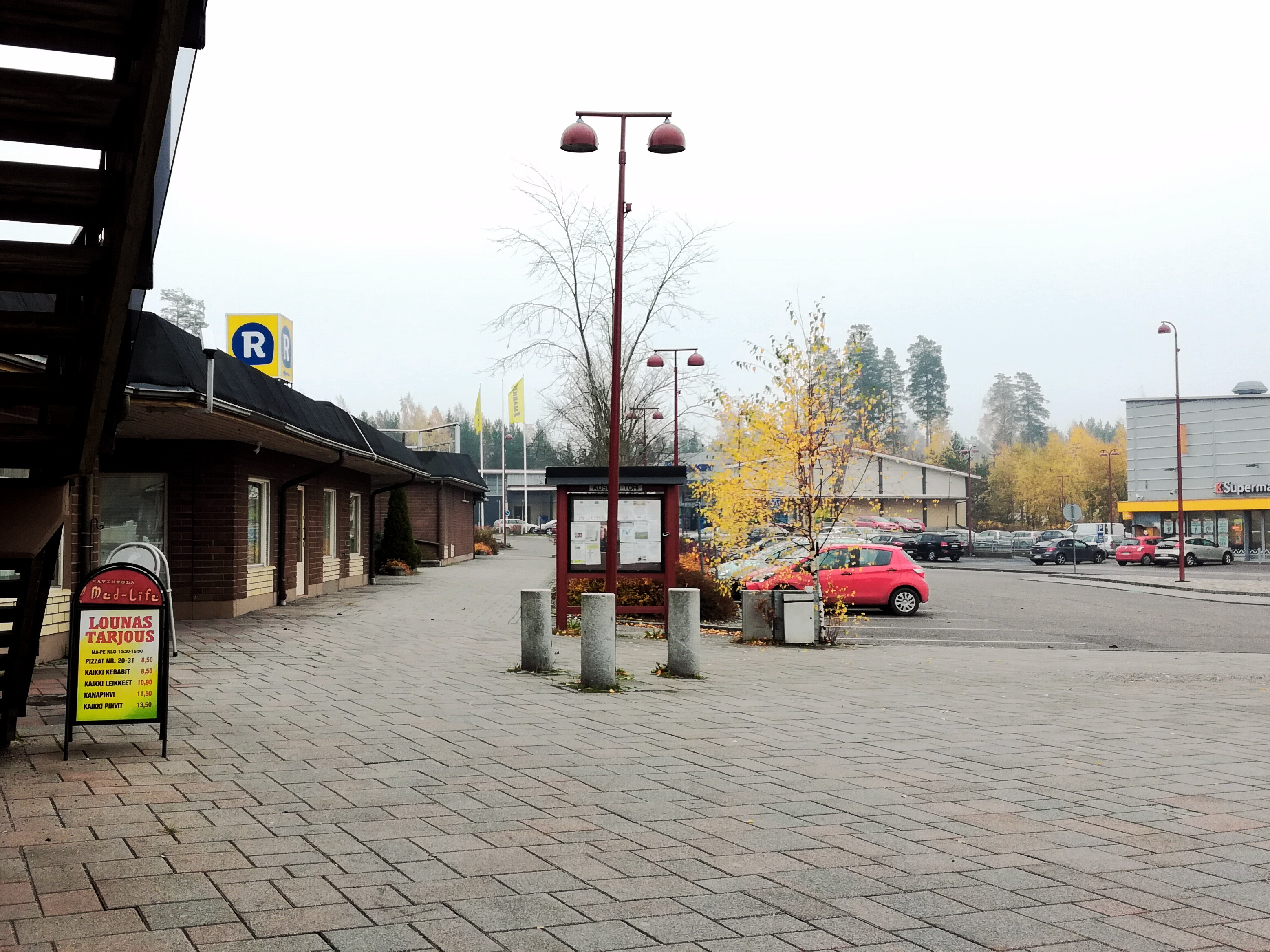
The centre of Veikkola

Major population centres in Kirkkonummi include the municipal centre, Masala, Veikkola, Kantvik and the Upinniemi naval garrison area. In addition to these, there are dozens of smaller villages. Geographically, Kirkkonummi has two famous peninsulas, namely Porkkala and Upinniemi, the latter one of which houses a major Finnish naval base. Porkkala is also on one of the main bird migration routes in the Baltic Sea region. Additionally, Kirkkonummi has a large central plains area, through which a railway goes from Helsinki to Turku as well as extensive lake areas, much of which is relatively untouched wilderness.

=== Climate ===
Kirkkonummi has a four-season humid continental climate (Köppen: Dfb) with long, cold, snowy winters, and warm summers; spring and fall are somewhat cool and brief seasons. Similar to that of Nova Scotia or Hokkaido. The monthly daily average temperatures range from −3.9 °C (25.0 °F) in January to 20 °C (68 °F) in July. Precipitation is well-spread throughout the year, though late spring to early summer is the driest season while late fall to winter tends to be the wettest. Its location in the very southern tip of Finland gives it a milder climate than that of northern Finland, being influenced by the North Atlantic Current and the Baltic Sea. Record temperatures range from −31.4 °C (−24.5 °F) in February, up to 34.8 °C (94.6 °F) in July. The plant life hardiness zones are between 6a and 7a, representing an annual extreme minimum temperature between −23.3 and −17.8 °C (−9.9 and 0.0 °F).

Climate data for Kirkkonummi 2010-present normals, records 2010-present
Month	Jan	Feb	Mar	Apr	May	Jun	Jul	Aug	Sep	Oct	Nov	Dec	Year
Record high °C (°F)	8.3 (46.9)	8.7 (47.7)	14.5 (58.1)	21.7 (71.1)	29.9 (85.8)	32.5 (90.5)	34.8 (94.6)	32.6 (90.7)	27.2 (81.0)	18.6 (65.5)	14.2 (57.6)	11.4 (52.5)	34.8 (94.6)
Mean maximum °C (°F)	7.1 (44.8)	6.7 (44.1)	10.3 (50.5)	17.4 (63.3)	27.1 (80.8)	31.0 (87.8)	31.8 (89.2)	29.4 (84.9)	23.5 (74.3)	14.9 (58.8)	10.4 (50.7)	7.2 (45.0)	17.8 (64.0)
Mean daily maximum °C (°F)	−1.0 (30.2)	−2.2 (28.0)	4.6 (40.3)	9.4 (48.9)	15.7 (60.3)	20.5 (68.9)	22.6 (72.7)	21.1 (70.0)	15.7 (60.3)	8.5 (47.3)	3.5 (38.3)	0.0 (32.0)	9.1 (48.4)
Daily mean °C (°F)	−2.4 (27.7)	−4.8 (23.4)	1.1 (34.0)	5.6 (42.1)	12.0 (53.6)	18.1 (64.6)	20.0 (68.0)	18.6 (65.5)	14.6 (58.3)	7.6 (45.7)	2.7 (36.9)	−1.3 (29.7)	7.4 (45.3)
Mean daily minimum °C (°F)	−4.0 (24.8)	−5.7 (21.7)	−1.1 (30.0)	3.0 (37.4)	8.3 (46.9)	13.9 (57.0)	16.2 (61.2)	14.1 (57.4)	9.5 (49.1)	6.8 (44.2)	1.0 (33.8)	−2.6 (27.3)	5.8 (42.4)
Mean minimum °C (°F)	−23.9 (−11.0)	−26.1 (−15.0)	−17.3 (0.9)	−7.2 (19.0)	−2.4 (27.7)	5.8 (42.4)	7.3 (45.1)	6.5 (43.7)	1.4 (34.5)	−5.1 (22.8)	−11.8 (10.8)	−16.9 (1.6)	−8.6 (16.5)
Record low °C (°F)	−30.2 (−22.4)	−31.4 (−24.5)	−24.3 (−11.7)	−11.8 (10.8)	−5.1 (22.8)	2.8 (37.0)	5.9 (42.6)	3.2 (37.8)	−3.7 (25.3)	−8.3 (17.1)	−21.7 (−7.1)	−25.6 (−14.1)	−31.4 (−24.5)
Average relative humidity (%)	89	86	77	69	64	66	70	77	83	85	89	89	79
Source 1: Past Weather in Kirkkonummi, Finland 2010–2020
Source 2: record highs and lows

== History ==
Kirkkonummi has been populated from the Stone Age to the present day as evidenced by the first Stone Age rock paintings found in Finland that are located by lake Vitträsk in the central lake region of Kirkkonummi. Incidentally, these paintings were found by the famous Finnish composer Jean Sibelius. The southern half of the municipality was leased to the Soviet Union between 1945 and 1956 for use as a naval base as part of the peace settlement that ended the hostilities between the Soviet Union and Finland during World War II. Signs of this time include concrete bunkers, other fortifications and the remains of an airbase.

== Demographics ==
Population size 1990–2025
Year	Population
1990	25,366
1995	27,316
2000	29,694
2005	33,581
2010	36,942
2015	38,649
2020	40,082
2025	41,725

== Politics ==
Results of the 2011 Finnish parliamentary election in Kirkkonummi:

- National Coalition Party 30.7%
- Social Democratic Party 16.8%
- True Finns 16.3%
- Swedish People's Party 14.3%
- Green League 10.1%
- Centre Party 4.4%
- Left Alliance 3.6%
- Christian Democrats 2.3%

== Attractions ==
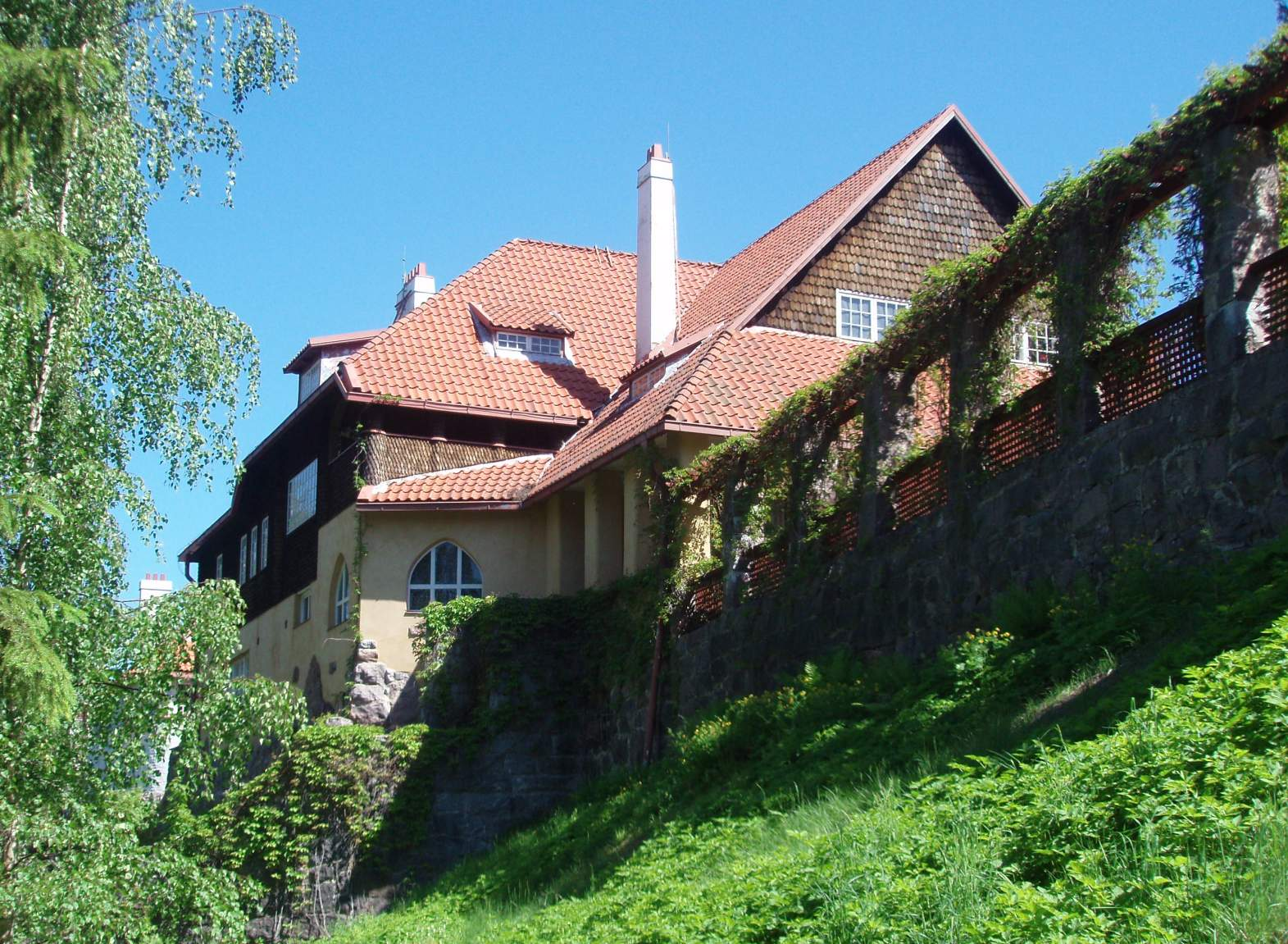
Hvitträsk mansion

Places of interest located in Kirkkonummi include the medieval stone church in the municipal centre, the wooden church in the village of Haapajärvi, as well as the Hvitträsk manor designed by Finnish architects Eliel Saarinen, Herman Gesellius and Armas Lindgren.

== Notable people ==
- Herman Gesellius (1874–1916), architect
- Seidi Haarla (born 1984), actress
- Jani Hakanpää (born 1992), professional ice hockey player
- Kai Meriluoto (born 2003), professional footballer
- Laura Närhi (born 1978), pop singer
- Daniela Owusu (born 2004), first Black woman to portray Saint Lucy in national celebrations
- Juuso Puhakka (born 1998), racing driver
- Riikka Purra (born 1977), politician
- Eero Saarinen (1910–1961), architect

== International relations ==
=== Twin towns — Sister cities ===
Kirkkonummi is twinned with:

- Sundbyberg, Sweden
- Paldiski, Estonia

== See also ==
- Finnish national road 51
- St. Michael's Church, Kirkkonummi
- Siuntio
