= Vihti (village) =

Village in Uusimaa, Finland

Coordinates: 60°24′57″N 24°19′36″E

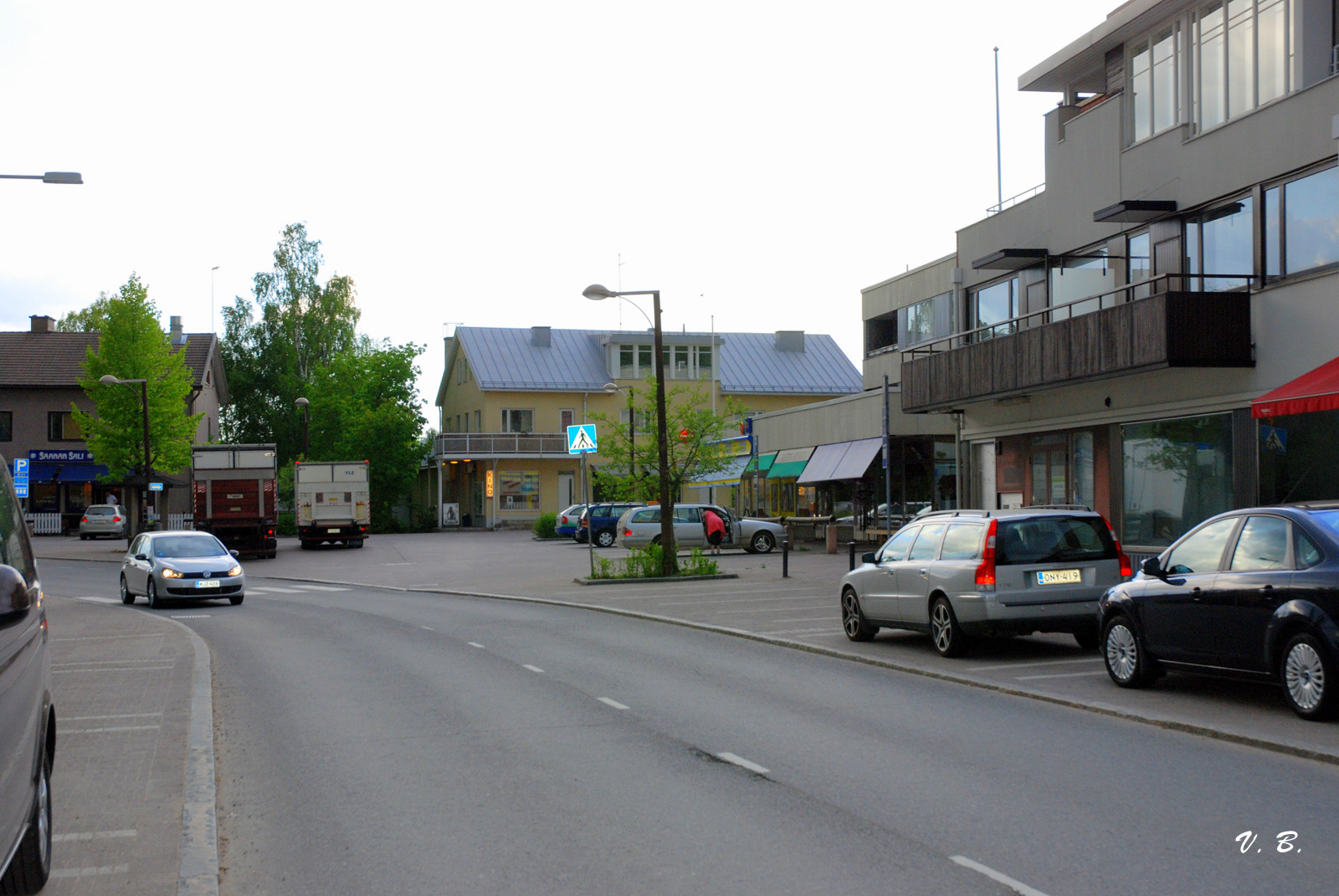
The center of the Vihdin kirkonkylä

Vihdin kirkonkylä (lit. 'Vihti church village') is the second largest urban area of the Vihti municipality in Uusimaa, Finland. It was the administrative center of the municipality until 2004, when the municipal office moved to Nummela. It is located in the northern part of Vihti on the shore of Kirkkojärvi basin of Lake Hiidenvesi. In 2022, the urban settlement had 3,339 inhabitants.

Vihti Church, the ruins of St. Bridget's Church. the Vihti Museum, the Siirilä Art House and the Summer Theater are located in the urban area. During the summer, the area hosts the Wuosisatamarkkinat festival and midsummer celebrations, both of which gather thousands of guests. In the summer of 2016, a nationwide mission was held in Vihdin kirkonkylä

In 1994, Vihdin kirkonkylä was chosen as the Village of the Year in Uusimaa.

== See also ==
- Nurmijärvi (village)
- Vihdintie
- Vihtijärvi
