= Haavisto (village) =

Village in Uusimaa, Finland

Coordinates: 60°31′15″N 24°20′45″E

Haavisto is a village in the town of Karkkila, Finland. The village is located along regional road 133 (Mt 133) between Karkkila and Vihti. To the south there is a connecting road to Olkkala and Vihti's church village, and to the north there is a road to Läyliäinen. Buses run through Haavisto a few times a day, mainly along regional road 132 (Mt 132), via Vihtijärvi and Klaukkala to Helsinki.
