= Lahnus =

- District of Espoo
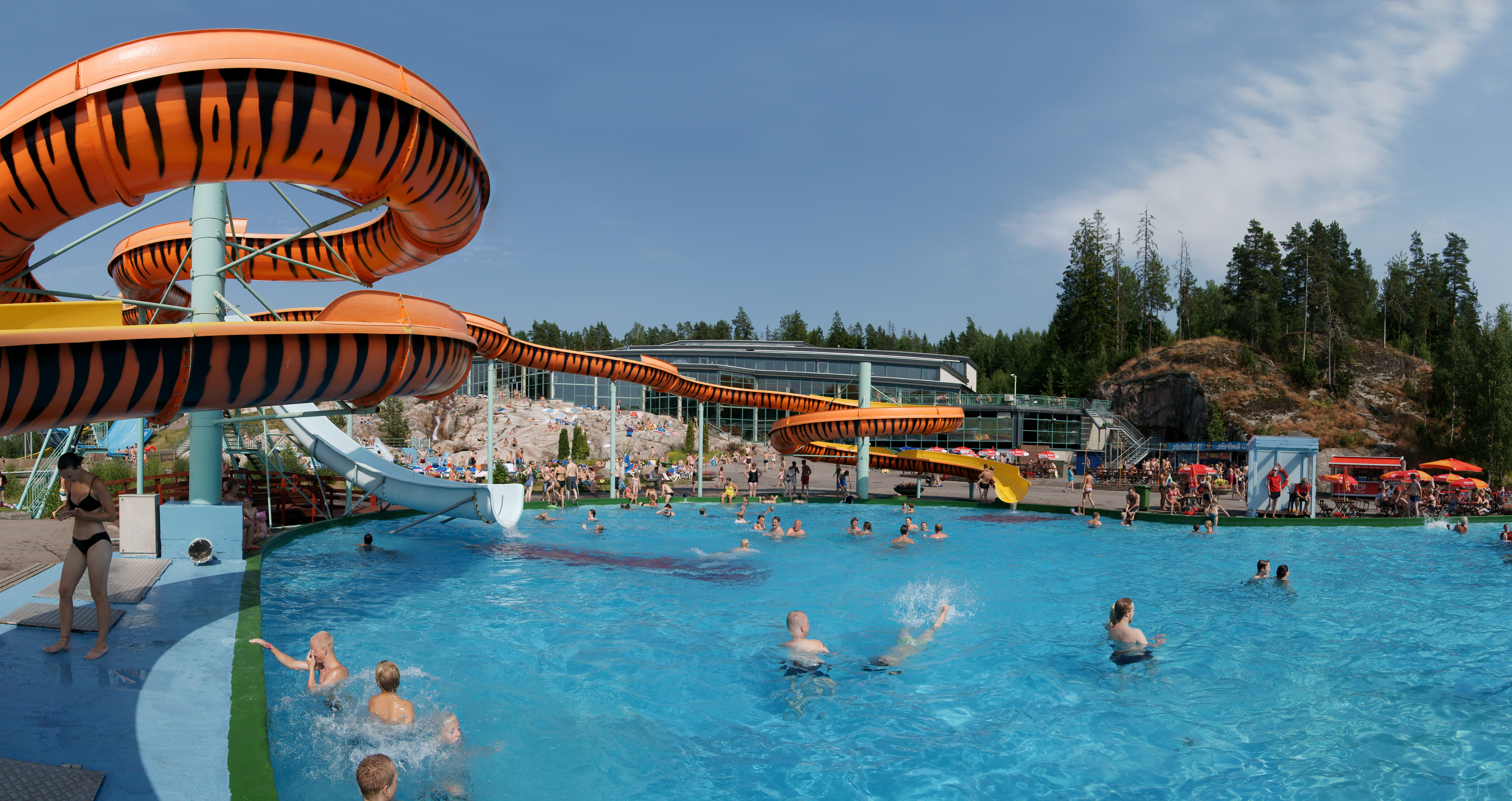
- Serena Waterpark in Lahnus

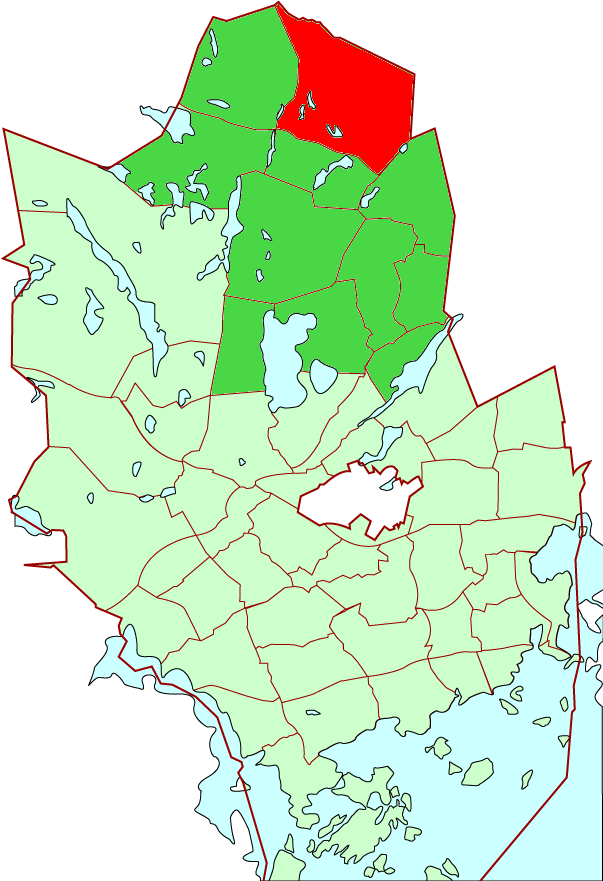
- Location of Lahnus within Espoo
- Country: Finland
- Municipality: Espoo
- Region: Uusimaa
- Sub-region: Greater Helsinki
- Main District: Pohjois-Espoo
- Inner District(s): Lahnus

Population (2006)
  - Total: 762

Languages
  - Finnish: 93.6 %
  - Swedish: 5.2 %
  - Other: 1.2 %

Lahnus is a district in the city of Espoo and administratively belongs to the Northern Espoo area. It is located near the municipality of Nurmijärvi and its largest village, Klaukkala. The most famous places in Lahnus are the Serena Waterpark and Hotel Korpilampi.

Finnish regional road 120 (Vihdintie) between Helsinki and Vihti, one of the most important road connections from Lahnus to the capital, passes through the district. Along the road, at the intersection near the Shell filling station, the north branch road to Klaukkala is Lahnuksentie (Mt 1324). There are also several nature reserves in Lahnus: Tremanskärr Nature Reserve and Luukki Nature Reserve, as well as part of Nuuksio National Park.

Lahnus is an old village name and has been spelled, among others: Lanoxby (1540), Lanos (1541), Lanas (1547), Lora (1558), Loureby (1559), Lahcnus (1563) and Lahnås (1594). The name is probably of Finnish origin, but the meaning is unclear. The highest daily rainfall in Finland was measured in Lahnus: on July 21, 1944, it was 198 millimeters.

== See also ==
- Röylä
