= Pohjois-Espoo =

Pohjois-Espoo Norra Esbo
- District of Espoo
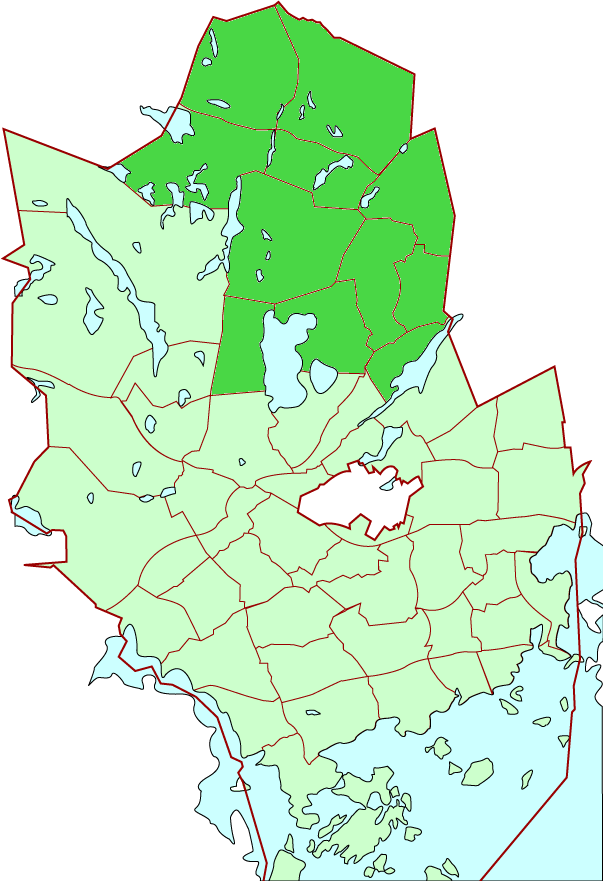
- Location of Pohjois-Espoo within Espoo
- Coordinates: 60.28°N 24.71°E
- Country: Finland
- Municipality: Espoo
- Region: Uusimaa
- Sub-region: Greater Helsinki
- Main District: Pohjois-Espoo

Population (2006)
  - Total: 9,548

Languages
  - Finnish: 90.7 %
  - Swedish: 6.1 %
  - Other: 3.2 %

Pohjois-Espoo (Swedish: Norra Esbo; lit. 'North Espoo') is a north main district of Espoo, a city in Finland.

It contains the districts Bodom, Kalajärvi, Lahnus, Lakisto, Luukki, Niipperi, Perusmäki, Röylä, Vanhakartano and Velskola.

== See also ==
- Districts of Espoo
- Nuuksio National Park
