= Hotel Korpilampi =

Hotel in Lahnus, Espoo, Finland

Coordinates: 60°19′31″N 024°43′47″E

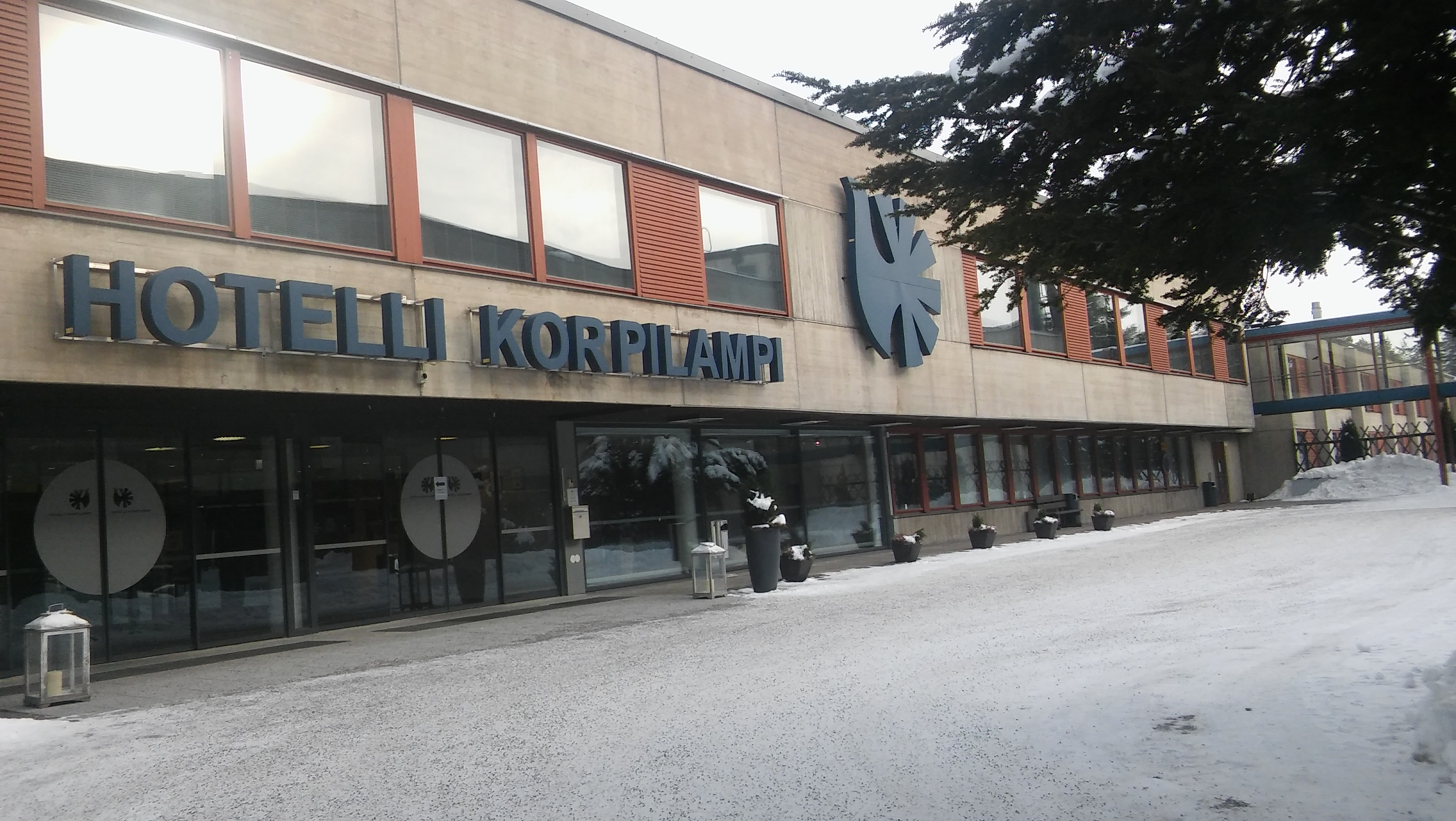
Main facade of Hotel Korpilampi

Hotel Korpilampi is a hotel in Lahnus, Espoo, Finland, operated by Pandox. Construction of this first so-called "wilderness hotel" in the Helsinki capital region started in 1975 and the hotel was opened in 1977. The hotel became publicly known in connection with the Korpilampi seminar in 1977. The hotel has a total of 156 rooms and 17 conference halls. The hotel also has a restaurant, a spa and a health club. Lomaliitto, the previous owner of Hotel Korpilampi, went bankrupt in 2009. After the bankruptcy the hotel was closed for a year and a half until Pandox bought the hotel.

== History ==
Construction of Hotel Korpilampi was started in 1975 as a joint venture called Tornilampi by HOK-Elanto, Enso-Gutzeit and the SKOP bank. The lot designated for construction had a total area of 17 hectares, and construction started by building an artificial pond by moving about 60 thousand cubic metres of mud away from the ground so that the maximum depth of the pond was 12 metres. As the lot for the hotel was full of rocky ground, it required extensive ground transport work before a basis for a building with 162 hotel rooms, five restaurants and an auditorium with 300 places could be built. A dormitory with 23 rooms for the hotel staff was built next to the hotel. Right from the start, the hotel was marketed in connection with Finnlines as suitable for Middle European passengers of the GTS Finnjet, but this strategy never paid off, but instead HOK-Elanto grew tired of the losses in the early 1980s and sold Hotel Korpilampi to Lomaliitto owned by the trade union association.

In 1989 the Serena water park was opened next to the hotel, and the hotel itself also became known as Serena Korpilampi.

== Korpilampi seminar ==
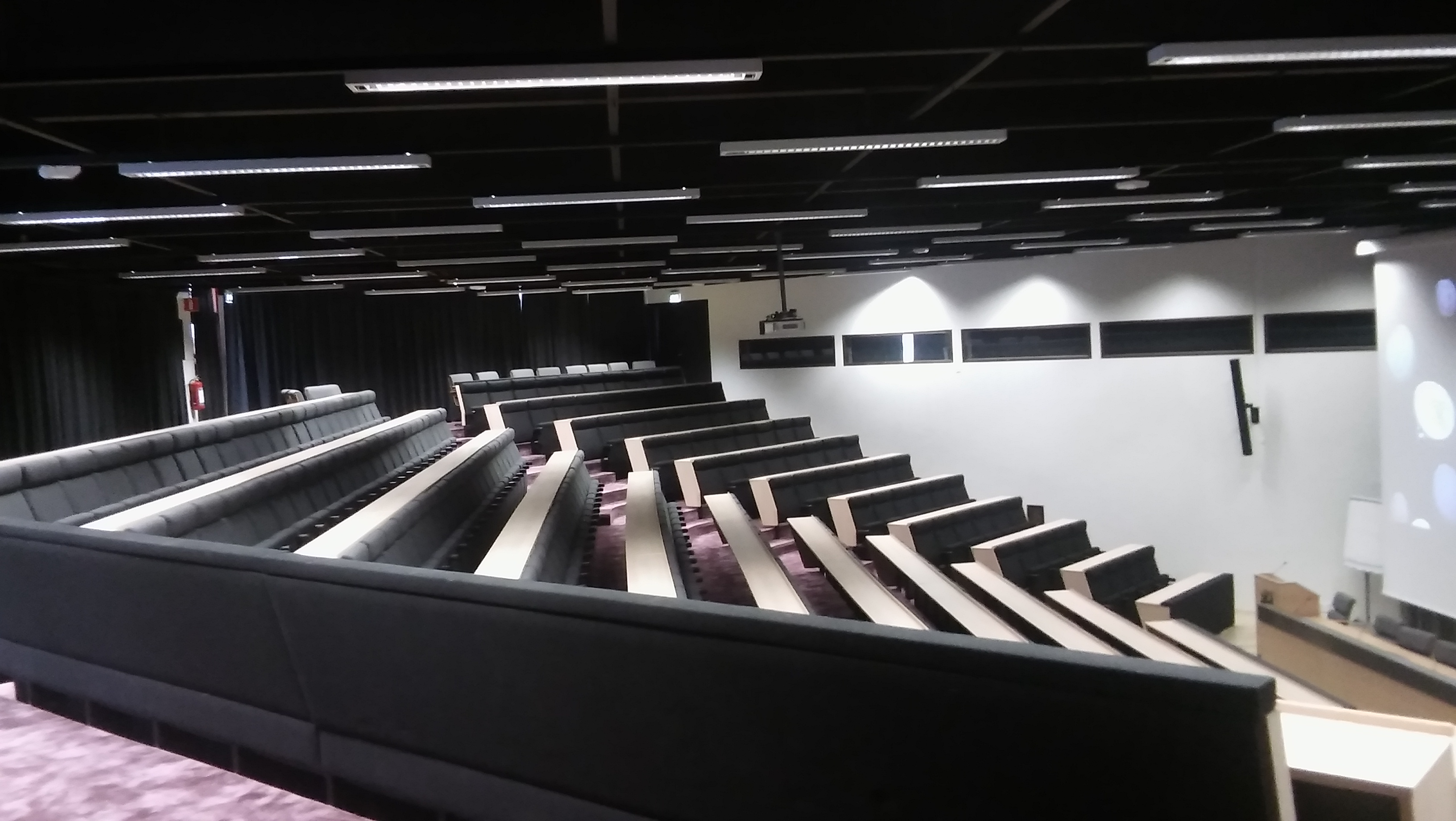
The auditorium at Hotel Korpilampi

The Korpilampi seminar was a financial and political seminar held at Hotel Korpilampi in 1977, organised by Kalevi Sorsa, the Prime Minister of Finland at the time. The seminar was attended by the elite of the political parties, organisations and businesses in Finland, numbering 350 in total. This conference, which has grown to mythical proportions in Finnish society, established a political consensus of the coming financial politics in Finland.
