= Serena Waterpark =

Finnish water park in Lahnus, Espoo

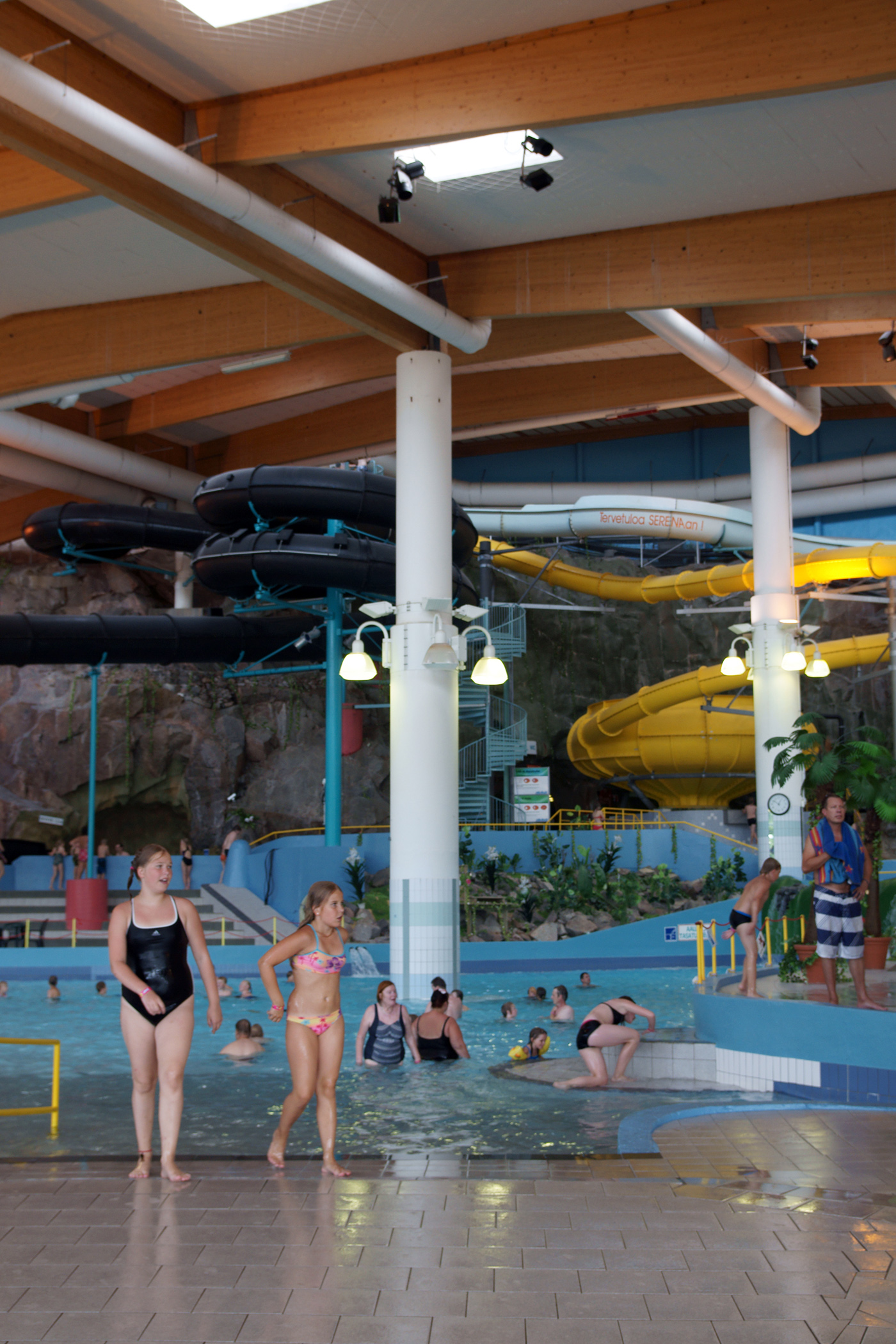
- Serena Waterpark indoor pools and slides
- Interactive map of Serena Waterpark
- Location: Tornimäentie 10, Lahnus, Espoo, Finland
- Coordinates: 60°19′32″N 024°44′21″E
- Opened: June 1989
- Owner: Aspro Parks
- General manager: David López Soriano

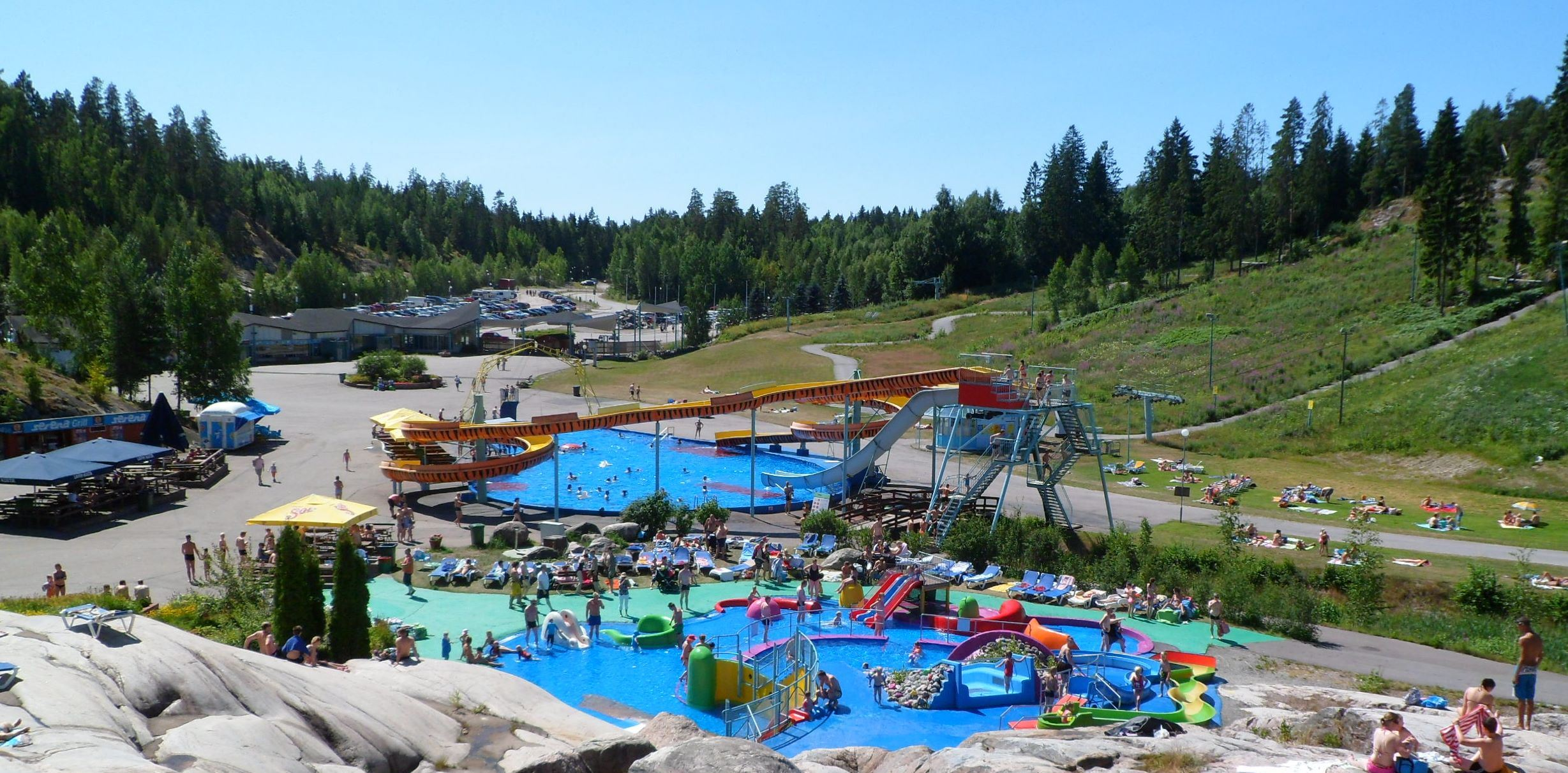
Outdoor area of the water park in 2013

Serena Waterpark (Finnish: Vesipuisto Serena) is a water park located along to the Vihdintie road in the Lahnus district of Espoo, Finland. It was opened after extensive excavation and construction work in June 1989. Serena is the largest indoor water park in the Nordic countries, and it is also one of the most popular travel destinations in Southern Finland, with more than 200,000 people visiting the water park every year.

With the depression in Finland in the early 1990s, the water park's original owner Serenaland Oy went bankrupt, and after that, the bankruptcy estate was transferred to Tervakoski's Puuhamaa in 1992. The current owner is Spanish Aspro Ocio S.A., to whom Puuharyhmä Oyj, which previously owned it, was sold in March 2007.

The water park features a variety of water slides, patios and hot tubs, children's pools and sparkling rapids, and the sauna departments are located in a part of the water park excavated inside the rock. There are also restaurants and cafés in the area. The Serena Ski Center is open in winter. There are six cottages for rent all year round.

The Serena Pop & Rock music festival was held in the area for the first time in 2014.

== See also ==
- Hotel Korpilampi, a hotel near the waterpark
- Visulahti, another Finnish waterpark in Mikkeli
