= Vihti Church =

Coordinates: 60°25′06″N 24°19′10″E

- Gustav's Church
- Vihdin kirkko, Vichtis kyrka
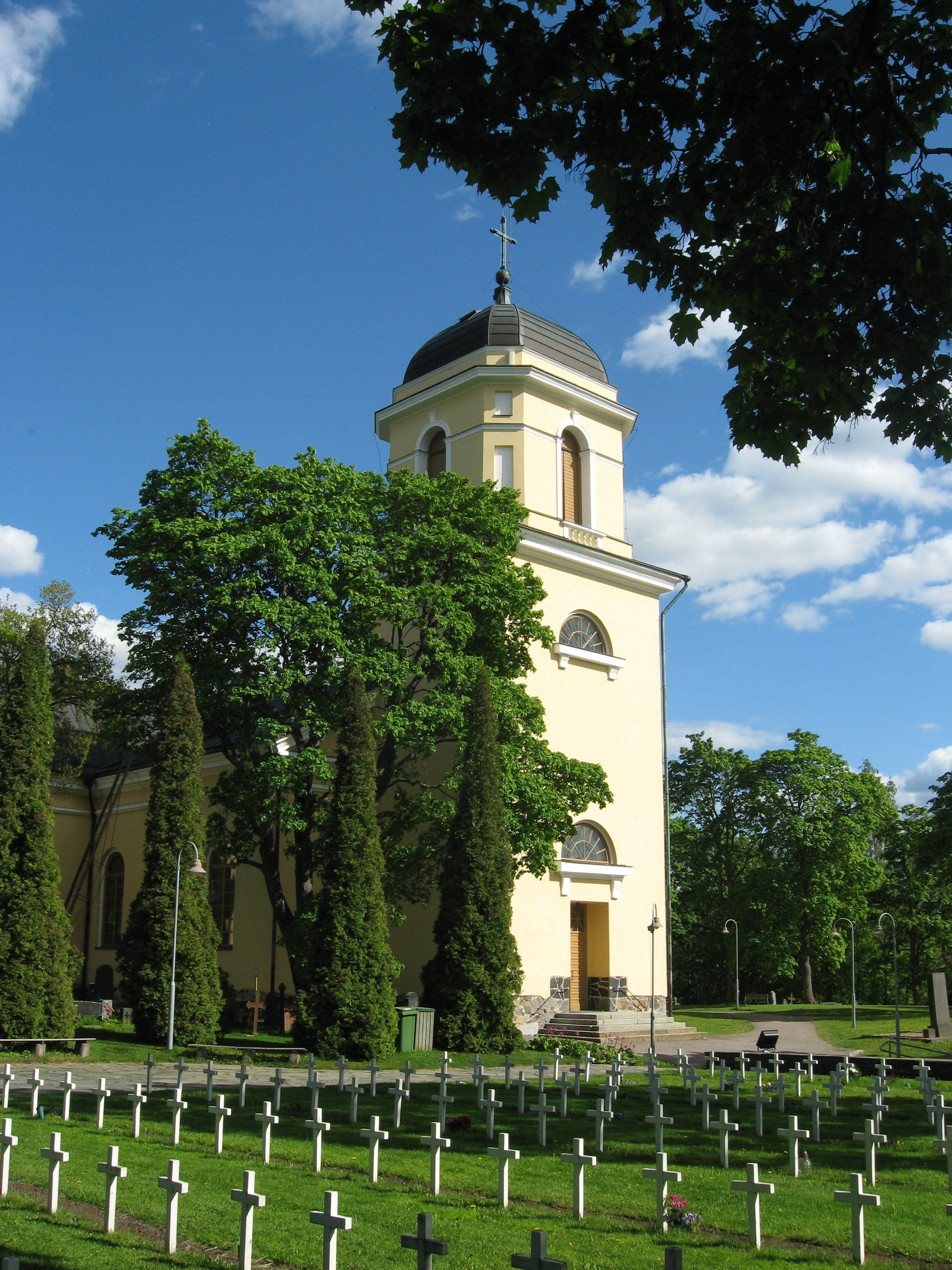
- Bell tower of Vihti Church
- Vihti Church
- Location: Vihti, Uusimaa
- Country: Finland
- Denomination: Lutheranism
- Religious institute: Evangelical-Lutheran Church of Finland
- Website: https://www.vihdinseurakunta.fi/

Architecture
- Heritage designation: Protected by law
- Architect(s): Antti Piimänen, Charles Bassi
- Style: Neoclassicism
- Years built: 1772

Administration
- Diocese: Diocese of Espoo
- Parish: Vihti parish

Vihti Church (Fin. Vihdin kirkko, Swe. Vichtis kyrka) is a Lutheran church built in 1772 in Vihti, Finland. The church is located in Vihti church village on Hartanmäki Hill. Vihti church was constructed according to Antti Piimänen's plans. The church has been ravaged by fire twice and both times it was reconstructed. Vihti church is also sometimes referred to as Gustav's Church after Gustav III of Sweden.

There is also a ruin of a medieval church in Vihti; St. Bridget's Church.

== Architecture and history ==
The primary building material used in construction of Vihti church is red brick which has been plastered and painted. Vihti church is shaped like a cross and it has a bell tower on the western side of the church. Vihti church was constructed according to church designer and master builder Antti Piimänen's plans and opened on 29 September 1772. At that time churches were named after the reigning monarch and therefore the Vihti church was named Gustav's Church after Gustav III of Sweden. In later years the name wasn't used as much and the name Vihti church became a more commonly used name.

Vihti church can house approximately 500-600 people. There were a little less than 2 000 inhabitants in Vihti at the time of construction of the church which means that one third of the parish members could fit inside the church in the 18th century. It wasn't very common for such small towns to have so big churches at the time.

=== Antti Piimänen's church ===
The decision to build a new church was made on 17 December 1760. It took many years to make the bricks that were used to construct the church and the building work was started ten years later in 1770. The construction work was completed in 1772 and the new church was standing in the middle of the village on the Hartanmäki hill. No original blueprints have been saved to this day but the original shape of the church has remained as it is. The only exception to this is the old sacristy which was later turned into a smaller, separate church room for services in Swedish. Services in Swedish were held for the Swedish-speaking inhabitants regularly until the year 1926.

The original organ with 13 registers and the original altar painting Jesus in Gethsemane were both completed in 1798.

=== The first fire ===
A lightning bolt struck the church's bell tower on 22 July 1818 and almost everything inside the church was lost to the fire. Only a large chandelier was saved. The diary of dean Hipping tells a story about the disaster: "But a harsh faith was waiting for this beautiful church. On the 22nd of July in 1818 right after noon dark clouds started to gather in the sky. At about 2 in the afternoon a lightning bolt struck the bell tower. The fire was spreading fast and in approximately one hour had everything that was inside of the church turned into ashes. The brick walls were partly standing and a temporary roof made of boards and hay was constructed between the walls."

=== Reconstruction ===
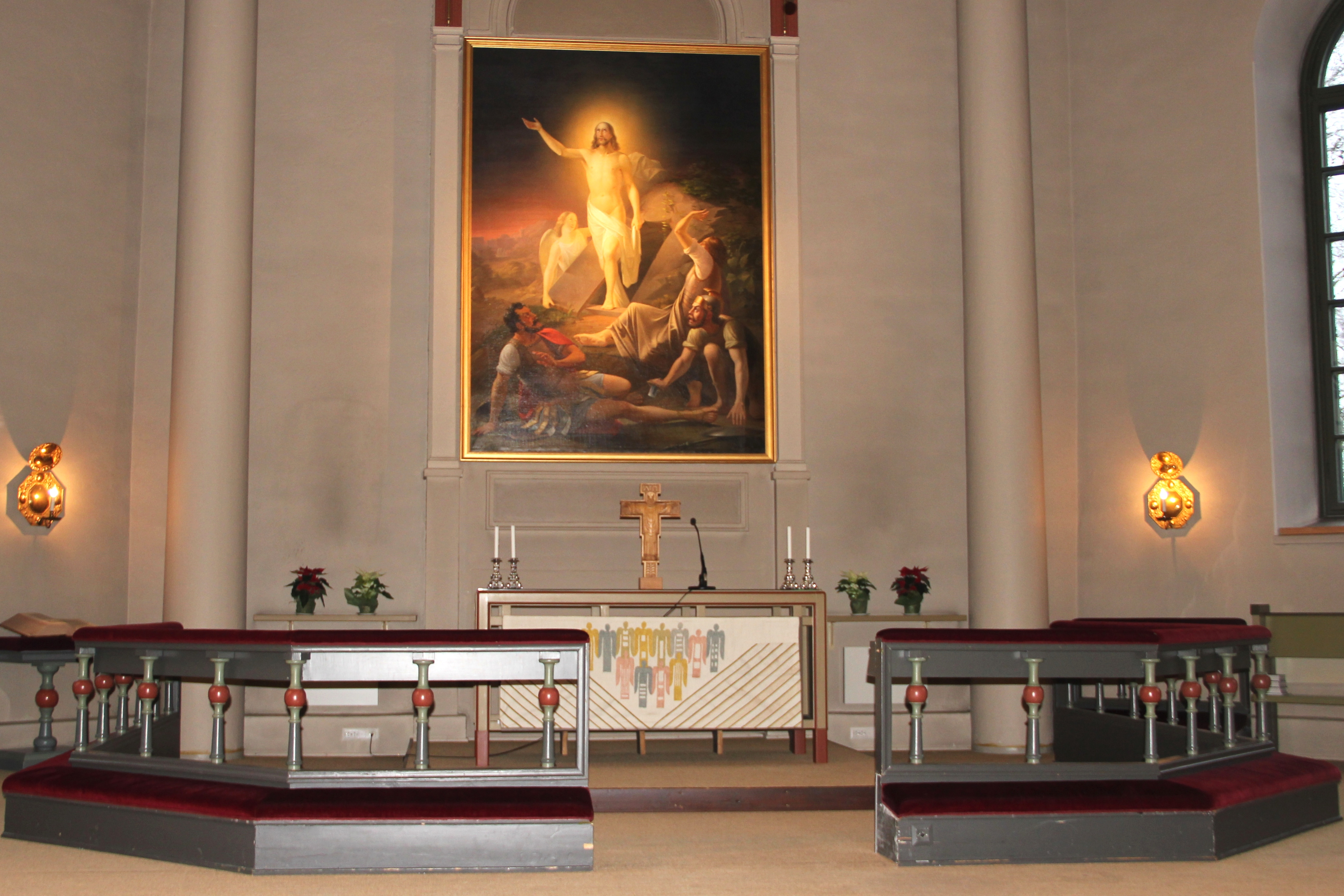
Altar painting Resurrection of Christ

The church was reconstructed following architect Charles Bassi's plans. Bass preserved the original shape of the church but, for example, added more windows. The classical shape of the bell tower and windows and doors can still be seen today. Vihti church was reopened in the end of 1822. The new organ was constructed and completed in 1835. It was only in 1845 when the new altar painting Resurrection of Christ was commissioned. The artist was Finnish B. A. Godenhjelm who lived in St. Petersburg. The new altar painting arrived to Vihti in 1846 but the altar was still under construction and there were some disagreements when it came to funding. Therefore, the new altar painting, which is also the current altar painting, was stored in the vicarage to wait for the completion of the altar.

=== The second fire ===
A lightning bolt struck the church again in August 1846. Almost everything was lost to the fire again and just some pieces of movables were saved like the chandelier, which was also saved from the previous fire. Also the new altar painting was saved since it was still stored in the vicarage.

The Helsingfors Tidningar newspaper wrote a couple of days later: Today on the 8th of august at half past two in the afternoon a lightning bolt struck the church roof setting the church on fire. The fire spread very fast and the roof was all ablaze before anyone was able to come for help. Only the church silver, chasubles and a couple of psalm books were saved.

=== New reconstruction ===
A new temporary church was constructed on the church yard. After some waiting Vihti parish was granted a permission to reconstruct the church according to Bassi's blueprints. Some of the church's classical features such as the dome and the windows of the bell tower were transformed to represent gothic revival. Vihti church was reopened again in 1848 but the new appearance of the church was preserved for 80 years.

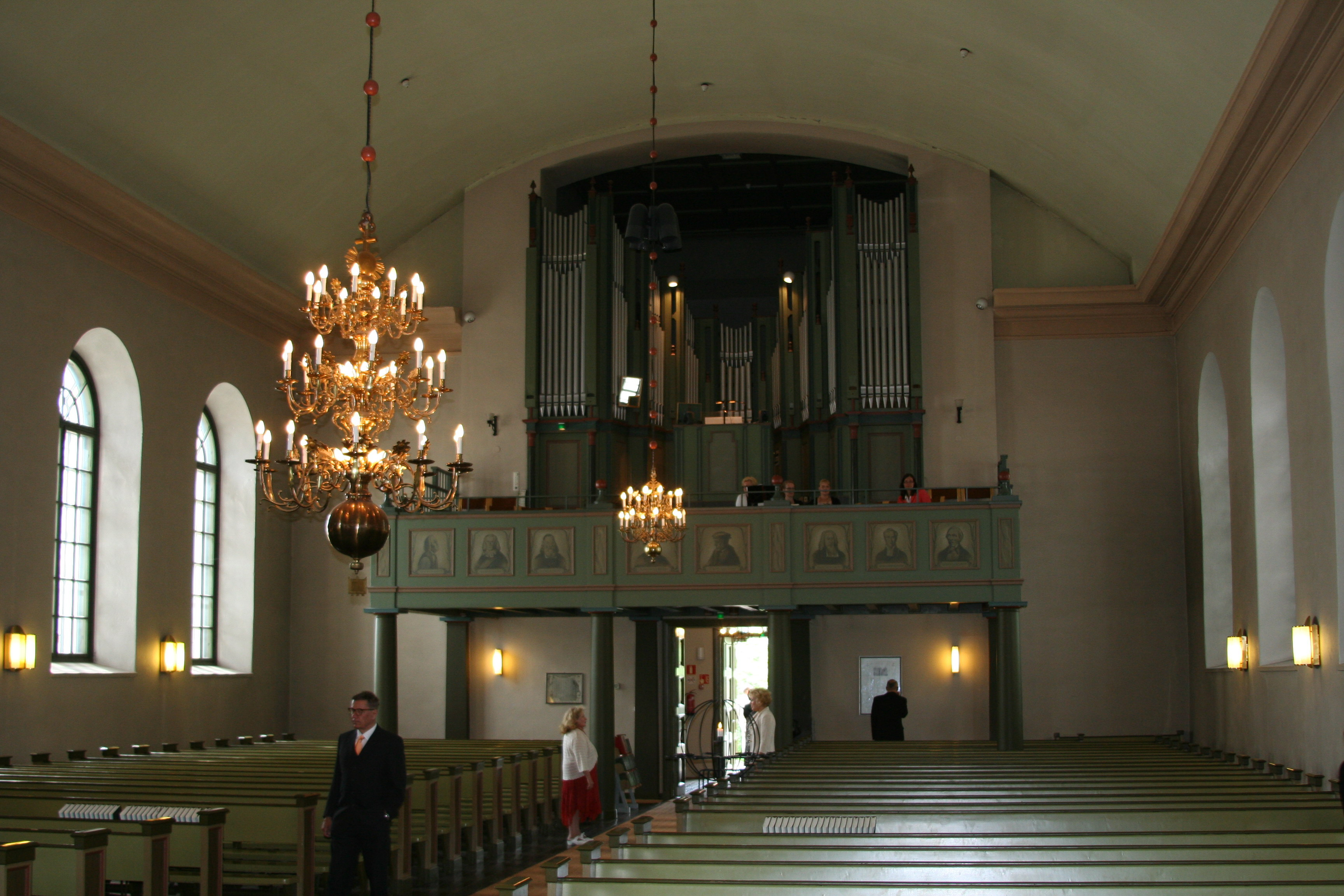
Main organ of Vihti church from 1860s

In 1847 Fredrik Pacius had organised a spiritual concert in Helsinki to rise funds to buy a new organ for Vihti church. It was though only in 1864 when the new organ with 16 registers was taken in use.

=== The 20th century renovation ===
Vihti church underwent a large renovation, designed by architect Kauno S. Kallio, in 1928–1929. The galleries were removed, the pulpit was moved and the Swedish-speaking church room in the northern part of the church was transformed into a classroom for confirmation school. Also a small entrance hall was built for this new classroom on the northern wall. The sacristy was moved on the southern part of the church and the space where the former southern gallery became a church museum. Some decorations that were considered to be useless were removed and six decorative pilars were constructed in the aspis. Also the gothic features were removed from the bell tower in order to make it look like it originally was according to Bassi's plans.

Decorative paintings were painted on the ceiling of the aspis and on the wall of the organ loft. A new organ with 27 registers was constructed. Vihti church was once again reopened in March 1929.

=== Later changes ===
The outer walls of Vihti church were painted in 1982. Some renovation works were carried out inside of the church in 1985 with architect Carl-Johan Slotte. Slotte, for example, removed some benches to make more room for a larger choir and orchestra. Vihti church was also painted from the inside and the interior after the renovation represents 1920s classicism. During the renovation also a new fire detecting and extinguishing system was installed. A new, smaller, organ with 16 registers was bought and placed in the aspis in 1990. A new copper roof was installed in 1995.
