= Securum =

Securum was a Swedish state company founded in 1992 during the 1990–1994 Swedish financial crisis for the purpose of taking on and unwinding bad debt from the partly state-owned Nordbanken bank. It followed a proposal made to the Swedish authorities by McKinsey & Co and based on better practices from the US banking crises of the 1980s (e.g., Savings & Loan, Resolution Trust Company and Mellon Bank). Many of the debts were owed by real-estate companies and it became a goal for Securum to stabilize the property market. The company was established when Anne Wibble was Finance Minister and Per Westerberg was Minister for Business and Industry in the Government of Carl Bildt.

The company took over a quarter of the bank's credit portfolio, comprising 3000 credits with 1274 companies (of which 790 were listed companies, the biggest of which was Nobel Industries to the value of 24 billion Swedish kronor). Securum had a share capital of 24 billion kronor from the Swedish state as well as 27 billion in credits. That would be enough to get through the crisis during a period of 10 to 15 years.

Securum's design was quite particular and followed proven success factors for a "bad bank": speed and independence to isolate the problem exposures, while simultaneously protecting capital and liquidity of the surviving "good bank" and its operations. In addition, The company management were given free hands. A large number of the credits were unwound by the summer of 1994. Five flotations were executed: Nobelpharma – today Nobel Biocare – Servisair and three property companies: Castellum AB, Norrporten as well as Pandox. By the summer of 1997, Securum itself could be wound down.

== See also ==
- Bad bank
- Swedish banking rescue
