= 1990–1994 Swedish financial crisis =

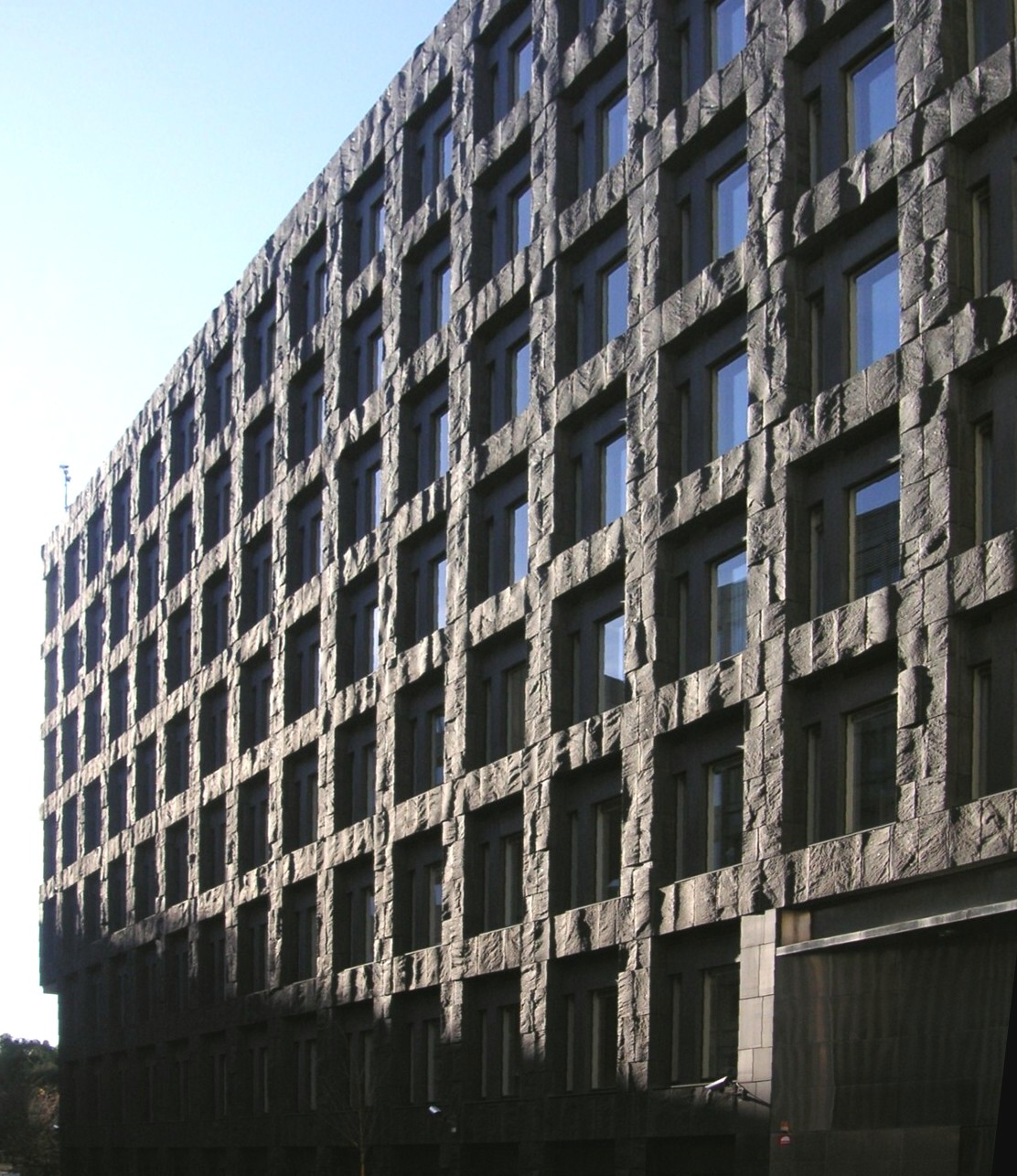

The 1990–1994 Swedish financial crisis took place in Sweden when the deflation of a housing bubble caused a severe credit crunch and bank crisis and a deep recession. Similar crises took place in countries around the same time, such as in Finland and the Savings and Loans crisis in the United States. The causes of the crisis were similar to those of the subprime mortgage crisis of 2007–2008. In response, the government took the following actions:

- The government announced the state would guarantee all bank deposits and creditors of the nation's 114 banks.
- Sweden's government assumed bad bank debts, but banks had to write down losses and issue an ownership interest (common stock) to the government. Shareholders at the remaining large banks were diluted by private recapitalizations (meaning that they sold equity to new investors). Bondholders at all banks were protected.
- Nordbanken and Götabanken were granted financial support and nationalized at a cost of 64 billion kronor. The firms' bad debts were transferred to the asset-management companies Securum and Retriva which sold off the assets, mainly real estate, that the banks held as collateral for these debts.
- When distressed assets were later sold, the proceeds flowed to the state, and the government was able to recoup more money later by selling its shares in the nationalized banks in public offerings.
- Sweden formed the Bank Support Authority to supervise institutions that needed recapitalization.

This bailout initially cost about 4% of Sweden's GDP, later lowered to between 0–2% of GDP depending on various assumptions due to the value of stock later sold when the nationalized banks were privatized.

In September 2008, economists Brad DeLong and Paul Krugman proposed the Swedish experiment as a model for what should be done to solve the economic crisis that was affecting the United States at the time. Swedish leaders who played a role in devising the Swedish solution and have spoken about the implications for other countries include Urban Bäckström and Bo Lundgren.

== Relation to Japan ==
As Japan struggled to handle the deflationary situation following the collapse of the Japanese asset price bubble in the early 1990s, officials considered restructuring economic policy according to Sweden's example following its own financial crisis. These policy changes were never implemented in Japan.
