= Nuuksio =

Nuuksio Noux
- District of Espoo
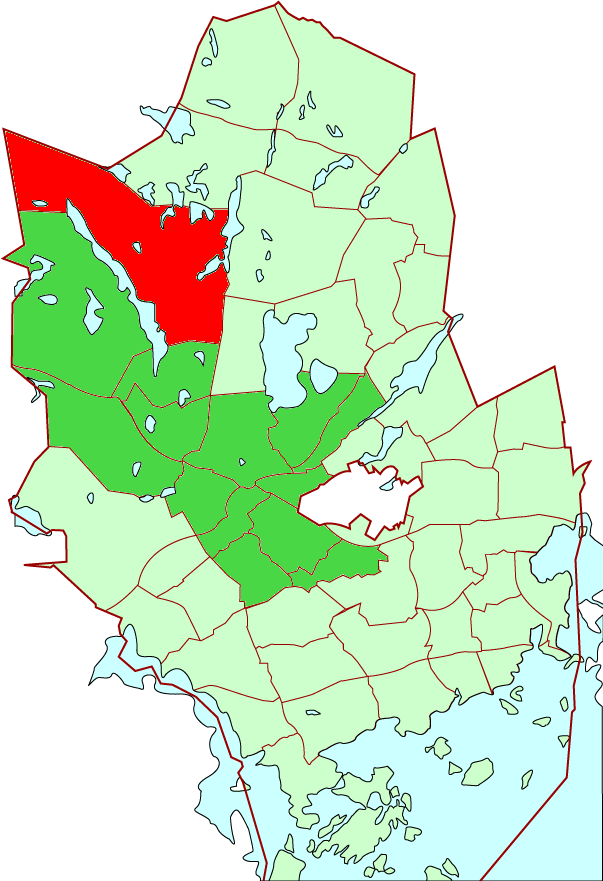
- Location of Nuuksio within Espoo
- Coordinates: 60°15′N 24°36′E
- Country: Finland
- Municipality: Espoo
- Region: Uusimaa
- Sub-region: Greater Helsinki
- Main District: Vanha-Espoo
- Inner District(s): Nuuksionpää

Population (2006)
  - Total: 123

Languages
  - Finnish: 82.1 %
  - Swedish: 17.1 %
  - Other: 0.8 %
- Jobs: 54

Nuuksio (Finnish) or Noux (Swedish) is a district of Espoo, a city in Finland, best known for the Nuuksio National Park. The Solvalla Sports Institute is also located in Nuuksio.

== Etymology ==
The Finnish name, Nuuksio, comes from the Swedish name, Noux, an old name which has had many forms, such as Noox (1540), Noosis (1541), Nooxby (1552) and Nowx (1556). The name has been thought to have been derived from the Sámi word njukča, meaning swan. However, this etymology is considered doubtful because a Sámi u would not plausibly transform into the diphthong ou or uo found in early forms of the name.

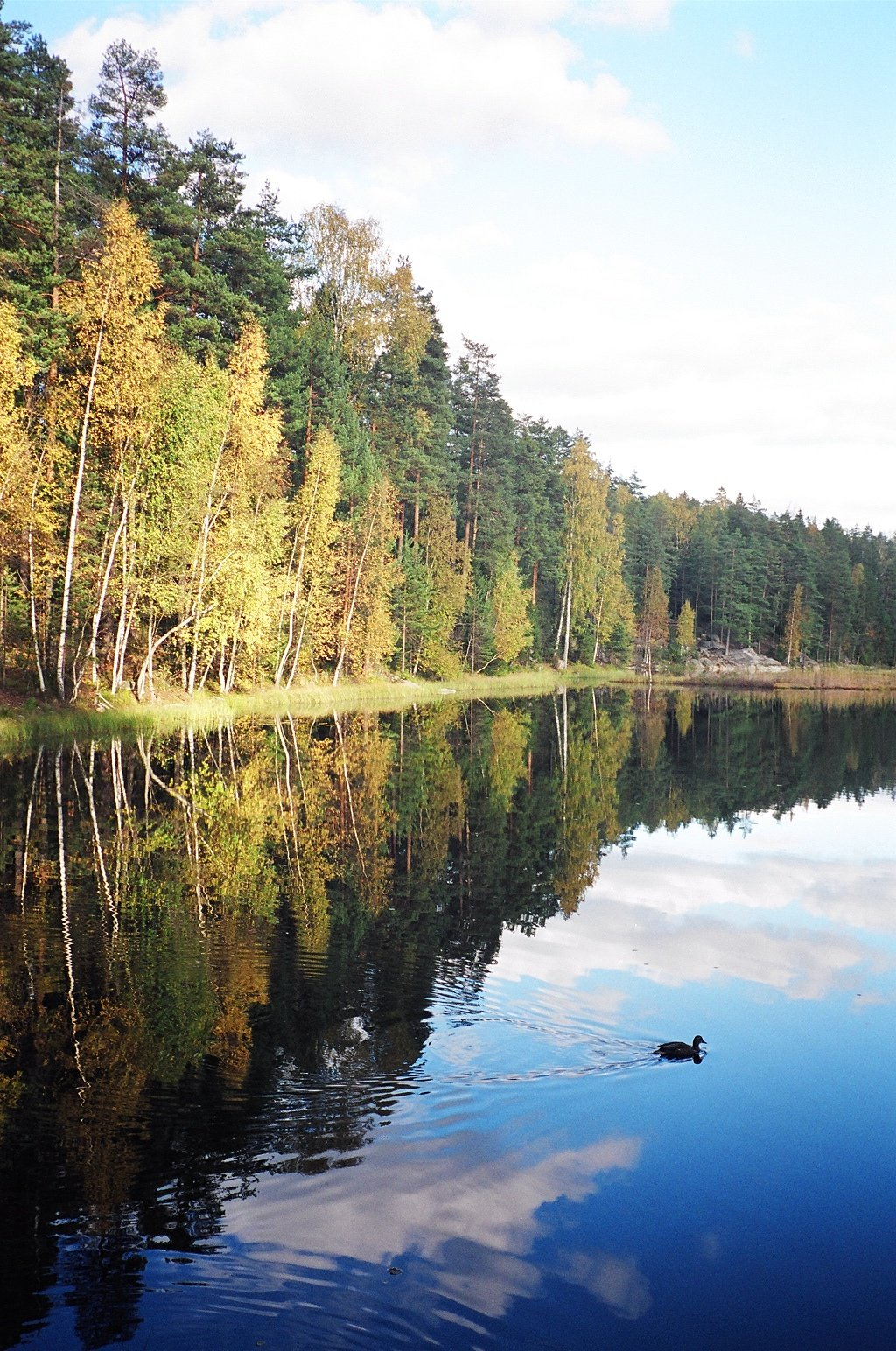
Lake Mustalampi

== See also ==
- Röylä
- Vanha-Nuuksio
- Districts of Espoo
