= Antti Piimänen =

18th-century Finnish church builder

Antti (Anders) Piimänen (1712 in Turku — 16 October 1775 in Turku) was a notable 18th-century Finnish church designer and master builder, considered the originator of the 'long church' (pitkäkirkko) style characteristic of much of the South West and Tavastia regions of Finland.

Piimänen learned his trade before the formal apprenticeship system was implemented in Turku, and was only granted his official master status relatively late, in 1759. Around the same time, he was the master-builder-in-charge of the Turku Cathedral extension works.

Noted for both his masonry and carpentry skills, Piimänen is especially known for his timber construction legacy, which has influenced many later church designers. Notable churches built by Piimänen include the Baroque-style Längelmäki Church, designated and protected by the Finnish Heritage Agency as part of a nationally important built cultural environment (Valtakunnallisesti merkittävä rakennettu kulttuuriympäristö), as well as Vihti Church, and many others. He also built the bell tower of Ruovesi Church, adjacent to the church itself built by Piimänen's disciple, Matti Åkerblom.
