= Röylä =

Coordinates: 60°17′49″N 24°41′53″E

Röylä Rödskog
- District of Espoo
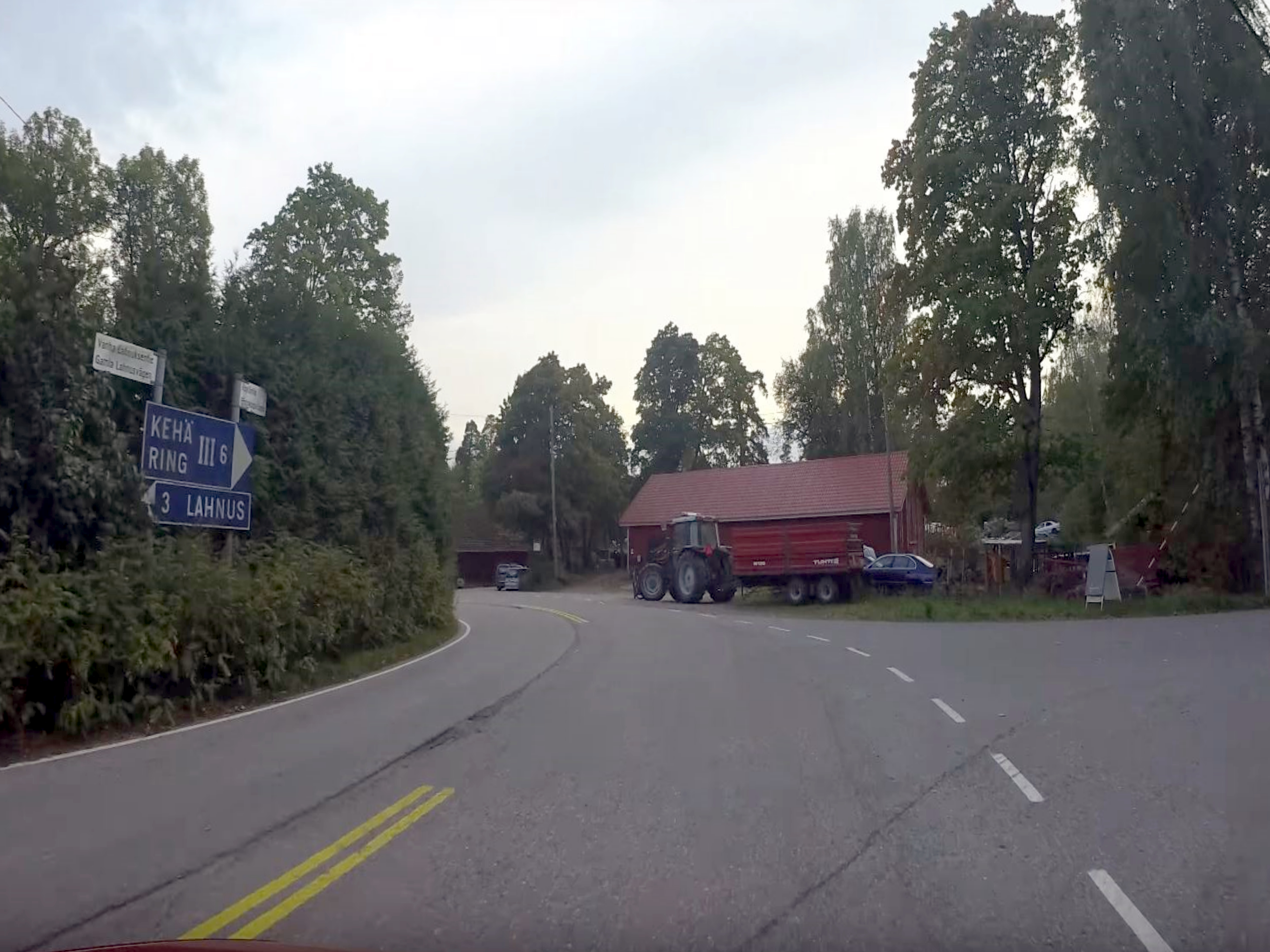
- At the intersection of the roads leading to Lahnus and Ring III in the middle of Röylä

- Location of Röylä within Espoo
- Country: Finland
- Municipality: Espoo
- Region: Uusimaa
- Sub-region: Greater Helsinki
- Main District: Pohjois-Espoo
- Inner District(s): Röylä

Area
  - Total: 14.3 km^{2} (5.5 sq mi)

Population (2020)
  - Total: 410
  - Density: 29/km^{2} (74/sq mi)

Röylä (Finnish: [ˈrøy̯læ]; Swedish: Rödskog [ˈrø̂ːdskuːɡ], Finland Swedish: [ˈrøːdskuːɡ]) is a district of Espoo, Finland. It is located in the Pohjois-Espoo area, northern shores of the Lake Bodom. Röylä had 410 inhabitants at the turn of the year 2019–2020 and the average age of the residents is 56,6 years. The Swedish name Rödskog literally means "red forest", but it may be an abbreviation of the words rödjad skog, which means a "burn-clearing forest" for agricultural purposes.

For the most part, Röylä consists of fields and forests. Many Stone Age settlements have been found in Röylä. The building stock of the area is almost completely detached houses. There are several small and smaller lakes in the western part of Röylä, such as Häkläjärvi, Sorvalampi, Hepolampi and Igelträsk. The eastern part of the narrow Lake Pitkäjärvi of Velskola also belongs to Röylä where only the northwestern part of Pitkäjärvi belongs to Velskola; the peninsulas protruding east from the northwest shore extend to the Röylä area according to the official district division.

There is one Swedish-language school in Röylä, Rödskogs skola. Right next to the school is Snettans Farm. In addition, Röylä has several horse farms with riding schools. In the southern part of Röylä is Hovgård, originally founded as an officer's mansion. Röylän ja Bodomin Seudun Omakotiyhdistys ry, founded in 1971, operates in the region of Pohjois-Espoo.

== See also ==
- Lahnus
- Nuuksio

== Sources ==
- Erkki Härö (1991). Espoon rakennuskulttuuri ja kulttuurimaisemat : Byggnadskulturen och kulturlandskapet i Esbo (in Swedish). Helsinki: Espoo City Museum. ISBN 951-857-182-1.
