= St. Bridget's Church, Vihti =

Coordinates: 60°25′01″N 24°18′33″E

St. Bridget's Church
- Pyhän Birgitan kirkko / Sankta Birgitta kyrka
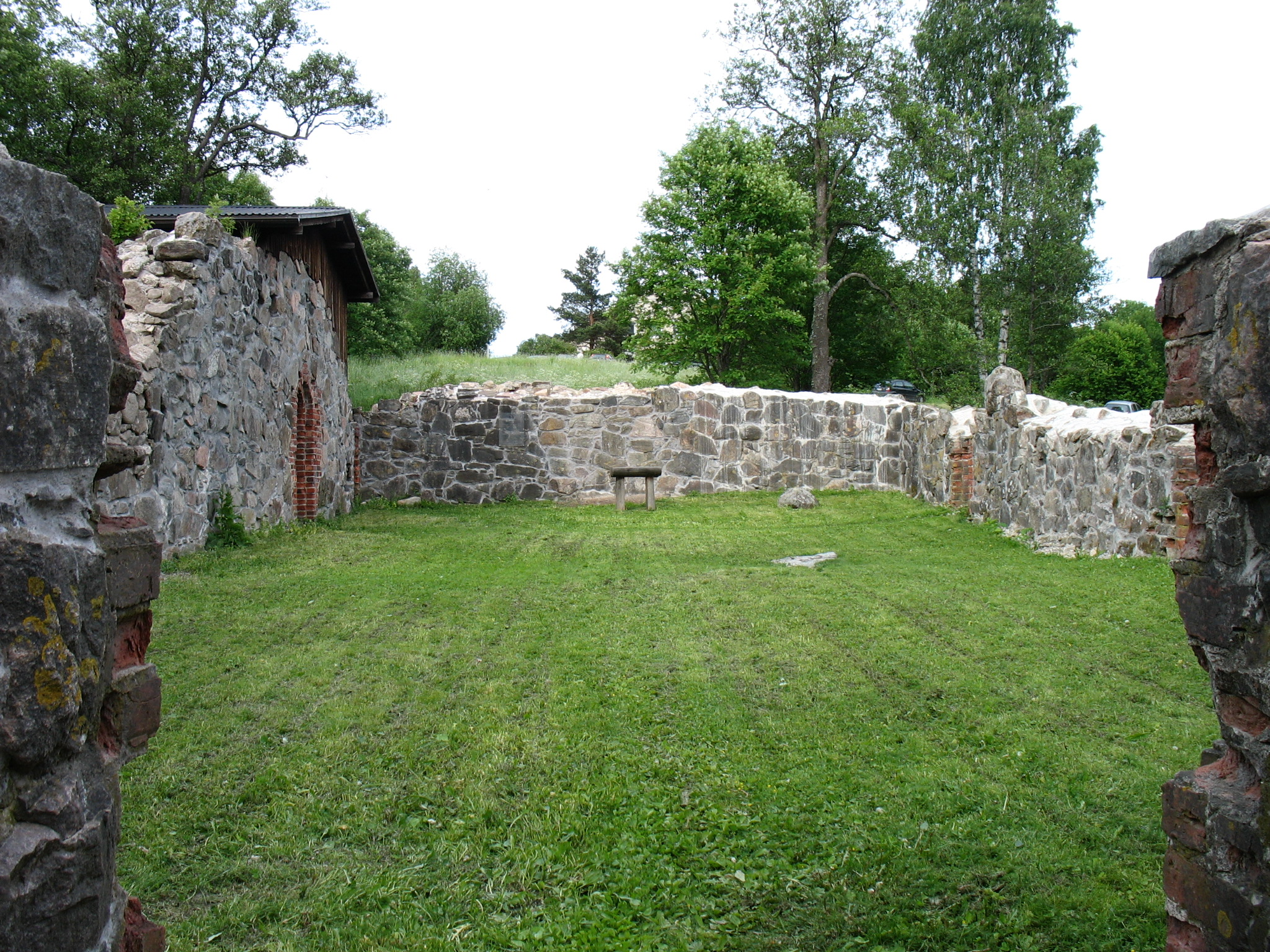
- Ruins of St. Bridget's Church in Vihti.
- St. Bridget's Church
- Location: Vihti, Uusimaa
- Country: Finland
- Language(s): Finnish, Swedish
- Denomination: Lutheran
- Previous denomination: Catholic

History
- Status: Ruin
- Dedication: Bridget of Sweden

Architecture
- Heritage designation: Protected by Law (Finnish Heritage Agency)
- Years built: C. 1500-1520
- Demolished: 1801 (parts sold via action)

Administration
- Archdiocese: Archdiocese of Turku

St. Bridget's Church (Finnish: Pyhän Birgitan kirkko, Swedish: Sankta Birgitta kyrka) was a medieval stone church located in the Finnish municipality of Vihti in the Uusimaa region. Built, according to some estimates, between 1500 and 1520, the church now lies in ruins. It served as the main church of the Vihti parish, with Bridget of Sweden as its patron saint.

== History and architecture ==
The ruins of St. Bridget's Church are located by Lake Hiidenvesi in Vihti. The early 16th-century church was made out of gray stone in a rectangular form with a sacristy attached. The ceiling of St. Bridget's Church had a vault made of wood. Only the sacristy had a stone vaulted ceiling. Both the vaulted ceiling and the inner walls originally featured paintings from 1670. Additionally, a separate bell tower, constructed of timber in 1682, stood on the eastern side of St. Bridget's. It is likely that the stone church was preceded by a wooden church.

St. Bridget's Church was constructed on soft, muddy ground, which caused severe problems with its foundation. Large cracks appeared on the walls of the church whenever the ground shifted. In 1656, the entire wall on the western side of St. Bridget's had to be remasoned. The repairs to the cracks and the rebuilding of one wall placed a heavy burden on the parish economy.

By 1801, the humidity had caused significant damage to the 16th-century temple, prompting the parish assembly to decide to sell the entire church via auction. Timber and rock from St. Bridget's were utilised as building materials by local farmers, for example, for their new cowsheds. The western wall of the church collapsed during an autumn storm in 1869.

What remains of St. Bridget's Church today is approximately a two-meter-high stone wall, along with a somewhat better-preserved sacristy. Some religious events are held at the church ruin during the summer by the local parish.

In 1772, a new church, Vihti Church, was built to replace St. Bridget's.

== Images ==
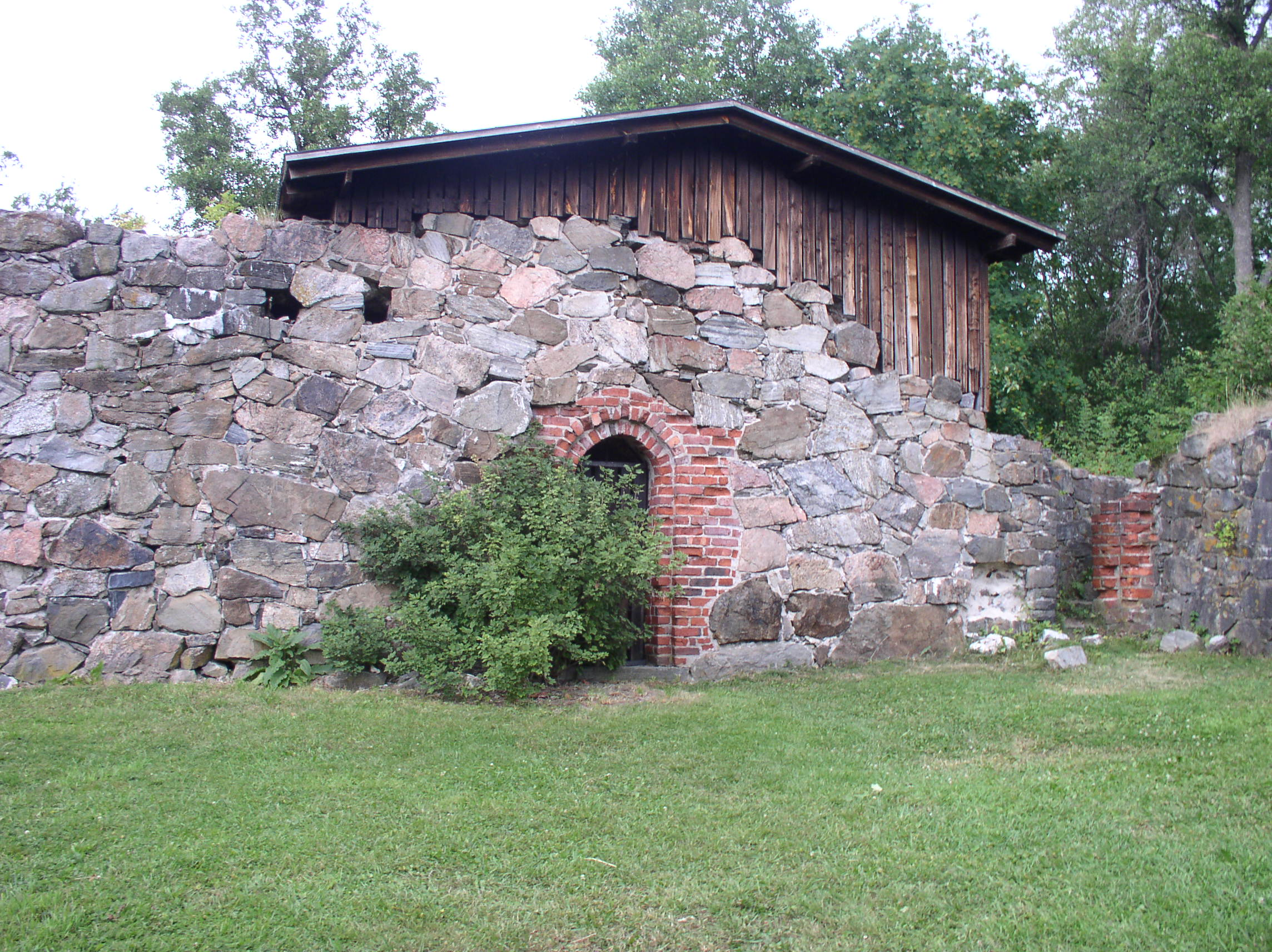
The sacristy.

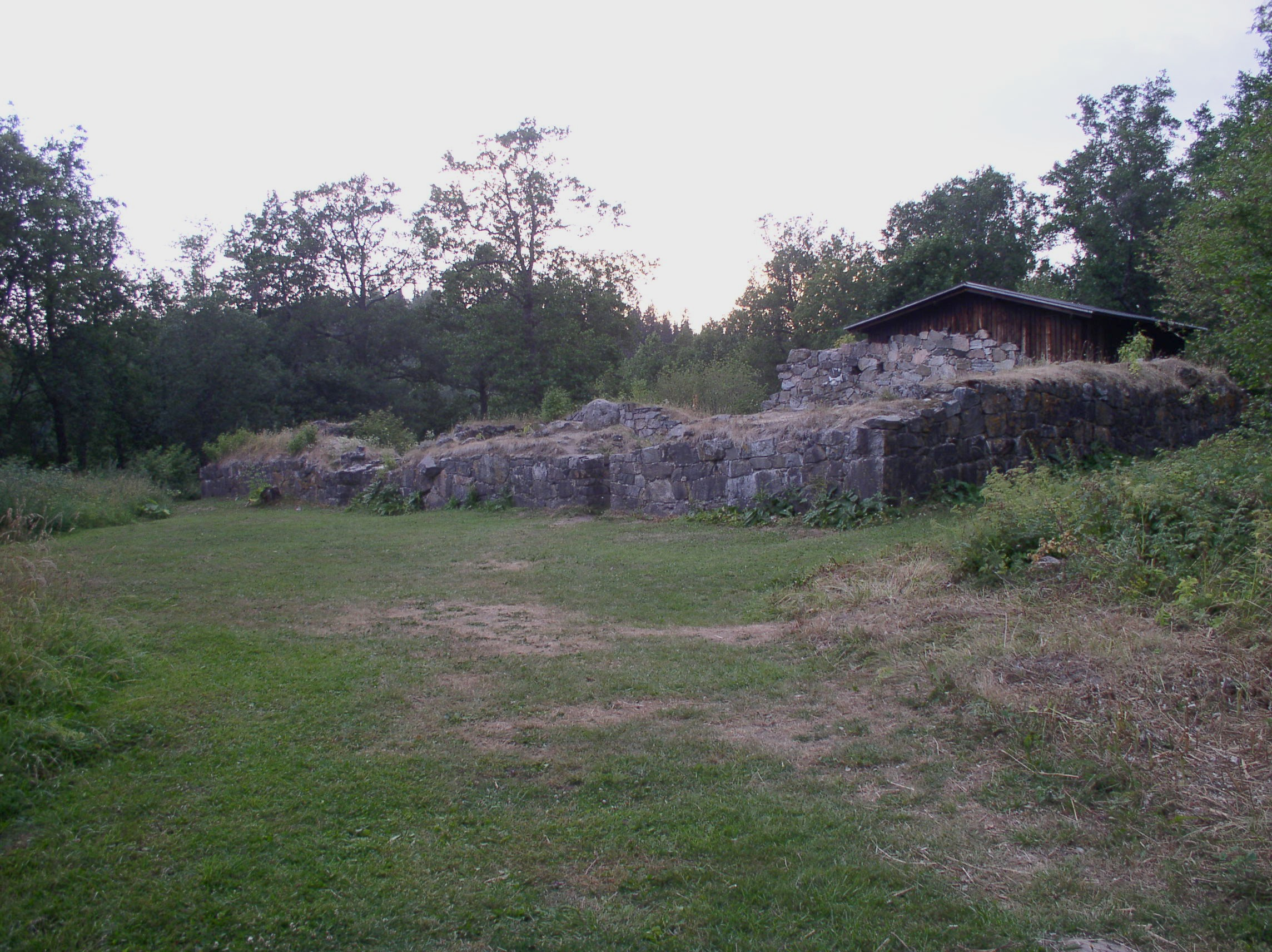
The southern wall.

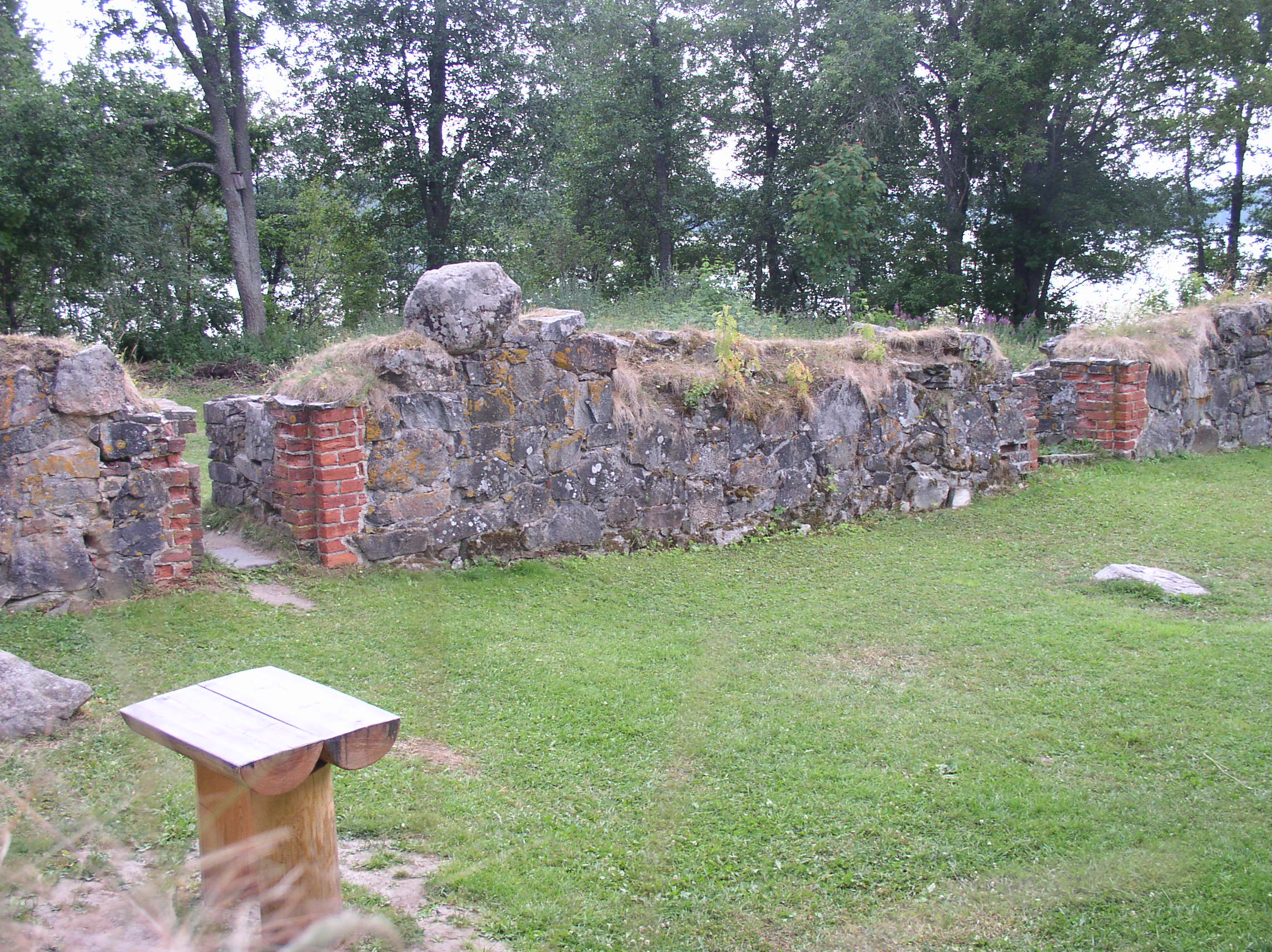
The church hall.
