= Pandox =

Hotel property company

Pandox AB
- Company type: Publicly traded
- Traded as: Nasdaq Stockholm: PNDX B
- ISIN: SE0007100359
- Industry: Hotel property management
- Founders: Securum and Skanska
- Headquarters: Stockholm, Sweden
- Area served: Europe
- Key people: Liia Nõu, CEO
- Services: Property Management; Hotel Operations
- Revenue: ▲SEK 7,469 billion
- Operating income: ▲SEK 4,550 billion
- Net income: ▲SEK 3,174 billion
- Total assets: ▲SEK 111,894 billion
- Total equity: ▲SEK 33,913 billion
- Number of employees: 1,494 (full-time equivalent)
- Website: www.pandox.se
- Footnotes / references Statistics from the 2025 annual report.

Pandox AB is a hotel property company. The company engages in ownership and management of hotel property. Pandox leases its hotel properties to hotel operators or runs hotel operations in its own hotel properties. Pandox owns 193 hotel properties, with a total of approximately 42,700 hotel rooms. The hotel properties are located in 11 countries.

The largest markets calculated in terms of property value are, in decreasing order, United Kingdom, Germany, Sweden, Ireland and Belgium. At the end of 2025, the hotel properties had a total market value of approximately SEK 92 billion.

Pandox is listed on Nasdaq Stockholm. The largest owners in terms of number of votes are the Norwegian companies Eiendomsspar AS, Helene Sundt AS and Christian Sundt AS.

== History ==
=== 1990s ===
In 1995, Pandox was formed by Securum and Skanska to restructure 18 properties and three smaller hotel operations during the financial and property crisis.

In 1997, Pandox was listed on Nasdaq Stockholm. At the listing, Pandox was valued at approximately SEK 1.3 billion. Pandox's IPO led to 4,000 new shareholders.

=== 2000s ===
In 2000, Pandox acquired Scandic's property-owning company and the company Hotellus. With the acquisition of the company Hotellus, Pandox took over 16 hotel properties, of which eight are in Sweden, three in Germany, three in Belgium, one in Denmark and one in England. After the acquisition of Hotellus, Pandox owned a total of 47 hotel properties and 8,500 hotel rooms.

In 2003, the Norwegian investors, the property company Eiendomsspar AS and the finance company Sundt AS, made a bid for Pandox worth SEK 2.6 billion.

In 2004, Pandox was bought out of Nasdaq Stockholm by Eidenomsspar AS and Sundt AS.

From 2004 to 2014, under the ownership of Eiendomsspars and Sundt AS, the market value of Pandox's property portfolio developed from approximately SEK 6 billion to approximately SEK 27 billion.

=== 2010s ===
In 2010, Pandox announced the acquisition of Norgani Hotels, with a portfolio of 73 hotel properties in Sweden, Finland, Norway and Denmark, with a transaction value of close to SEK 10 billion.

On 18 June 2015, Pandox was relisted on Nasdaq Stockholm The listing meant that the existing owners sold 60,000,000 B shares, corresponding to 40 percent of the company. 60 percent of the shareholding remained with the existing owners Eiendomsspar AS and Sundt AS.

In 2015, Pandox acquired a portfolio of 18 hotel properties with 3,415 rooms in Germany.

In 2017, Lone Star Funds sold 37 hotel properties with 4,694 rooms in UK and Ireland to Pandox for 800 million pounds.

From 2015 to 2019, the company has invested around SEK 24 billion in acquisitions and investments in hotel properties mainly outside the Nordic region.

=== 2020s ===
During 2020, Pandox was negatively affected by the coronavirus pandemic. Revenue fell by 50 percent, while net operating income decreased by approximately 45 percent, compared to 2019.

In May 2021, the former CEO and founder Anders Nissen died.

== Business segments ==
=== Leases ===
Leases is Pandox's largest business segment in terms of revenue. In 2025, it accounted for a revenue of 4,098 billion SEK. The business segment consists of Pandox acquiring and managing hotel properties, then leasing them out under long-term contracts to hotel operators.

=== Own operations ===
In 2025, the business segment Own operations accounted for a revenue of 3,371 billion SEK. The business segment consists of Pandox both owning the hotel property and managing the operation of the hotel. Pandox can operate a hotel by using one of its own brands or by signing a franchise agreement with an external hotel operator who thereby is allowed to manage the operation of the hotel.

== Markets ==
Pandox is active in 11 countries: Austria, Belgium, Denmark, Finland, Germany, Ireland, the Netherlands, Norway, Sweden, Switzerland and the United Kingdom.
