= Otalampi =

- Urban area
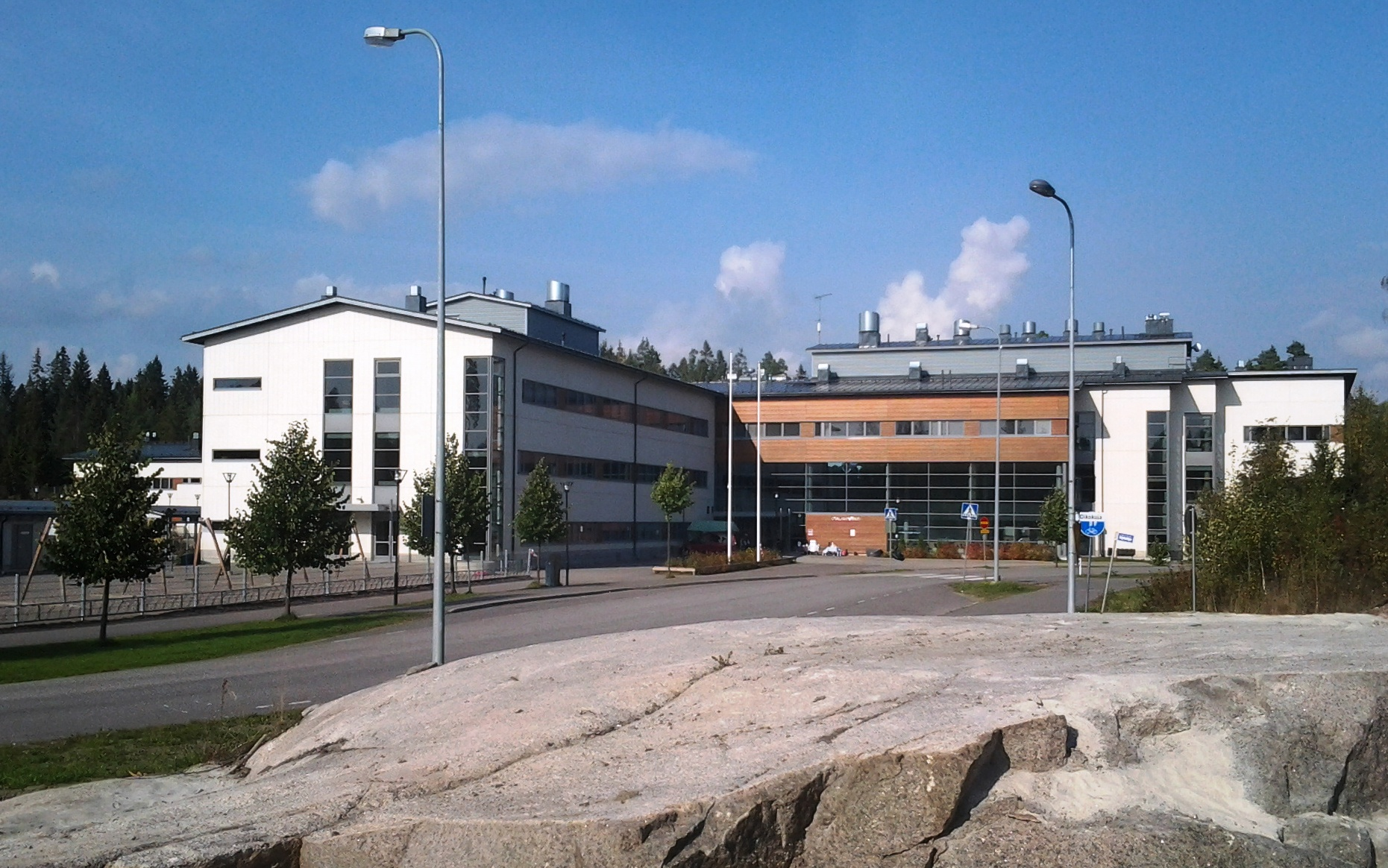
- The Otalampi House

- Location within Uusimaa
- Country: Finland
- Region: Uusimaa
- Municipality: Vihti

Area
  - Total: 6.07 km^{2} (2.34 sq mi)

Population (2020-12-31)
  - Total: 1,117
- Postal code: 03300

Otalampi is a village in Vihti municipality at the intersection of the Finnish national road 25 and the Vihti Road (Vihdintie). The population is about one thousand. Next to the village is a small lake called Otalampi, where the village got its name.

In 2008, the Otalampi House (Otalampi-talo) was completed in the village. The building houses a comprehensive school, a kindergarten and a maternity clinic at the same time.
