= Dicro =

Finnish electronics company

Dicro Oy
- Company type: Limited company (osakeyhtiö)
- Industry: Electronics
- Founded: 1987; 38 years ago
- Headquarters: Vihti, Finland
- Revenue: €5,220,000 (2021)
- Number of employees: 80 (2021)
- Website: www.dicro.fi/pages/EN/Home

Dicro Oy is a Finnish contract manufacturer of electronics, cable and electromechanical assemblies for various industrial, medical and telecommunication branch businesses. The company headquarters is in the municipality of Vihti in the town of Nummela, Finland. It was founded in 1987 and in 2001 opened a new manufacturing plant in Estonia. On February 13, 2006, Dicro bought out another Nummela based firm, RFI filter manufacturer named GE Procond Oy, until then part of General Electric. The new daughter company was renamed Procond Oy.

== Procond Oy ==
The company Procond Oy is based in Nummela and manufactures industrial RFI and EMP filters.

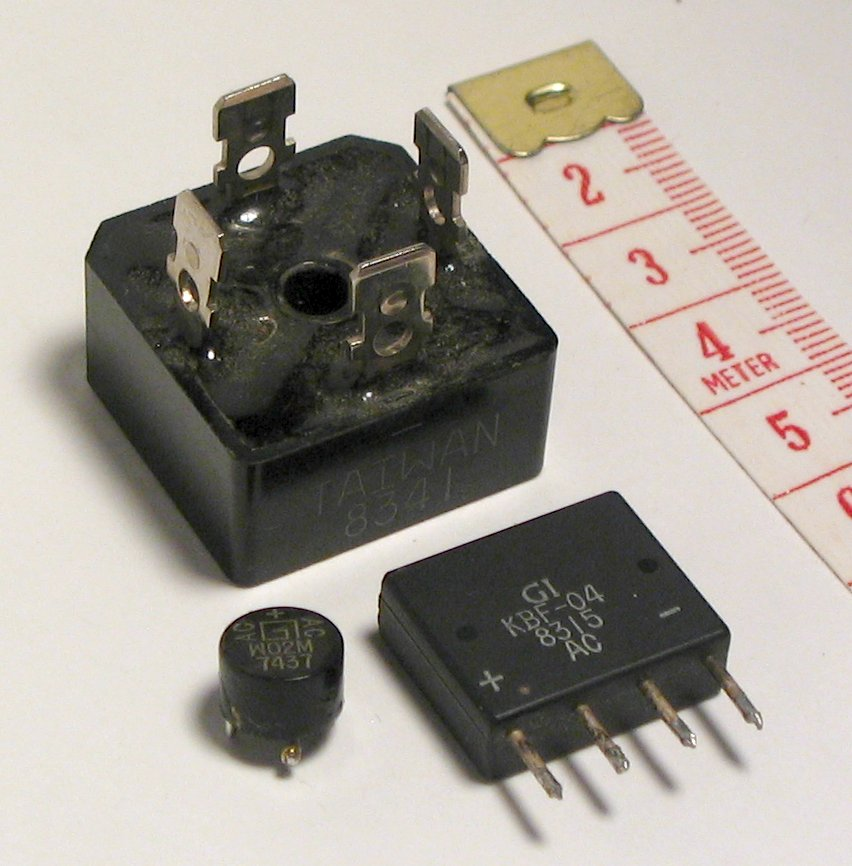
Some bridge rectifiers, but unfortunately, not the specific type made by Procond or Dicro.

These include:

- Power line filters
- RFI filters
- EMC filters
- EMP filters
- Rectifiers
