= Vihti =

Municipality in Uusimaa, Finland

Vihti Vichtis
- Municipality
- Vihdin kunta Vichtis kommun
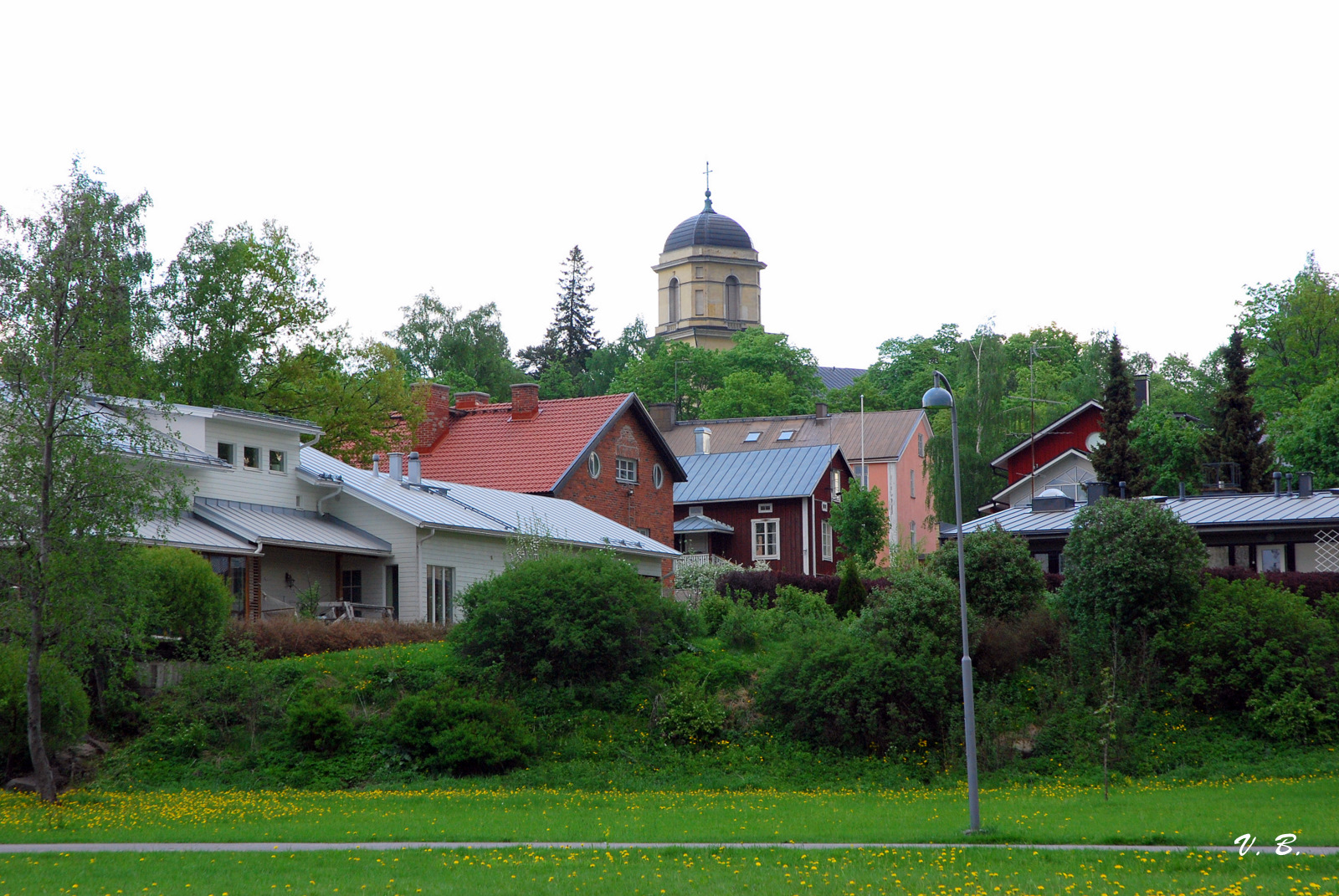

- Coat of arms

- Location of Vihti in Finland
- Interactive map of Vihti
- Coordinates: 60°25′N 024°19′E
- Country: Finland
- Region: Uusimaa
- Sub-region: Helsinki sub-region (formerly Lohja sub-region)
- Metropolitan area: Helsinki metropolitan area
- Charter: 1867
- Seat: Nummela (before 2004 Vihti church village)
- Villages: Ojakkala, Otalampi

Government
  - Municipality manager: Sami Miettinen

Area (2018-01-01)
  - Total: 567.06 km^{2} (218.94 sq mi)
  - Land: 522.02 km^{2} (201.55 sq mi)
  - Water: 45.02 km^{2} (17.38 sq mi)
  - Rank: 168th largest in Finland

Population (2025-12-31)
  - Total: 28,852
  - Rank: 37th largest in Finland
  - Density: 55.27/km^{2} (143.1/sq mi)

Population by native language
  - Finnish: 90.7% (official)
  - Swedish: 1.7%
  - Others: 7.7%

Population by age
  - 0 to 14: 18.2%
  - 15 to 64: 61.8%
  - 65 or older: 19.9%
- Time zone: UTC+02:00 (EET)
  - Summer (DST): UTC+03:00 (EEST)
- Climate: Dfb
- Website: www.vihti.fi

Vihti (Finnish pronunciation: [ˈʋiht̪i]; Swedish: Vichtis) is a municipality in Finland, located in the southern interior of the country. Vihti is situated in the Uusimaa region. The population of Vihti is approximately 29,000. It is the 37th most populous municipality in Finland. Vihti is part of the Helsinki metropolitan area, which has approximately 1.62 million inhabitants.

Vihti is located approximately 50 kilometres (30 mi) northwest of the capital city of Helsinki. Vihti has an area of 567.06 square kilometres (218.94 sq mi) of which 45.02 km^{2} (17.38 sq mi) is water. The population density is 55.27 inhabitants per square kilometre (143.1/sq mi). Its seat is Nummela, which is the most populated urban area in the municipality.

Vihti's neighbouring municipalities are, clockwise from the north, Karkkila, Loppi, Hyvinkää, Nurmijärvi, Espoo, Kirkkonummi, Siuntio and Lohja. There are several important road connections through Vihti, the most notable being the Pori Highway between Pori and Helsinki, the Hanko Highway between Hanko and Hyvinkää, and the Vihti Road between Vihti and Helsinki. The largest lake in Vihti is Lake Hiidenvesi, which is connected to the Gulf of Finland by Lake Lohja and the Karis River.

== History ==
The oldest literal mark of Vihti is from the 15th century. The old parish church, St. Bridget's Church, was also built during this time. After the deterioration of the old church, a new current church was built in Vihti and was completed in 1772.

== Politics ==
Results of the 2019 Finnish parliamentary election in Vihti:

- Finns Party 20%
- Social Democratic Party 18%
- National Coalition Party 17.9%
- Centre Party 14.2%
- Green League 10.1%
- Movement Now 5.2%
- Left Alliance 4.8%
- Christian Democrats 3.4%
- Swedish People's Party 2.4%
- Other parties 3.8%

== Economy ==
The electronics contract manufacturer DICRO Oy is one of its main employers, along with the local forestry companies and farmers.

== Villages ==
Haimoo, Härkälä, Jokikunta, Oinasjoki, Ojakkala, Palajärvi, Siippoo, Tervalampi, Haapkylä, Huhmari, Hulttila, Hynnölä, Härtsilä, Irjala, Jokikunta, Jättölä, Kaharla, Kaukola, Kauppila, Kirkonkylä, Kirvelä, Koikkala, Korkaniemi, Korppila, Kourla, Köykkälä, Lahnus, Lahti, Lankila, Leppärlä, Lusila, Maikkala, Merramäki, Niemenkylä, Niemi, Niuhala, Nummela, Olkkala, Ollila, Otalampi, Oravala, Pakasela, Pietilä, Pääkslahti, Ruskela, Salmi, Selki, Suksela, Suontaka, Taipale, Tarttila, Torhola, Tuohilampi, Vanhala, Vanjoki, Vanjärvi, Vesikansa, Vihti, Vihtijärvi, Vähäkylä

== Climate ==
Climate data for Vihti Maasoja (normals 1991-2020, extremes 1959-present)
Month	Jan	Feb	Mar	Apr	May	Jun	Jul	Aug	Sep	Oct	Nov	Dec	Year
Record high °C (°F)	8.5 (47.3)	9.4 (48.9)	16.4 (61.5)	23.8 (74.8)	29.4 (84.9)	31.5 (88.7)	33.8 (92.8)	32.2 (90.0)	27.7 (81.9)	18.0 (64.4)	13.7 (56.7)	11.1 (52.0)	33.8 (92.8)
Mean maximum °C (°F)	4.5 (40.1)	4.4 (39.9)	9.6 (49.3)	18.2 (64.8)	25.0 (77.0)	26.5 (79.7)	28.3 (82.9)	27.4 (81.3)	21.9 (71.4)	14.6 (58.3)	9.2 (48.6)	5.5 (41.9)	29.4 (84.9)
Mean daily maximum °C (°F)	−1.9 (28.6)	−2.0 (28.4)	2.4 (36.3)	9.2 (48.6)	16.1 (61.0)	19.9 (67.8)	22.7 (72.9)	21.3 (70.3)	15.7 (60.3)	8.5 (47.3)	3.2 (37.8)	0.0 (32.0)	9.6 (49.3)
Daily mean °C (°F)	−4.8 (23.4)	−5.5 (22.1)	−2.2 (28.0)	3.7 (38.7)	9.8 (49.6)	14.2 (57.6)	16.9 (62.4)	15.1 (59.2)	10.4 (50.7)	4.9 (40.8)	0.9 (33.6)	−2.4 (27.7)	5.1 (41.2)
Mean daily minimum °C (°F)	−8.5 (16.7)	−9.8 (14.4)	−6.9 (19.6)	−1.5 (29.3)	2.7 (36.9)	7.5 (45.5)	10.2 (50.4)	8.9 (48.0)	5.2 (41.4)	1.3 (34.3)	−1.9 (28.6)	−5.7 (21.7)	0.1 (32.2)
Mean minimum °C (°F)	−24.4 (−11.9)	−25.1 (−13.2)	−20.0 (−4.0)	−8.9 (16.0)	−4.2 (24.4)	0.5 (32.9)	4.1 (39.4)	2.0 (35.6)	−3.0 (26.6)	−8.0 (17.6)	−12.6 (9.3)	−18.8 (−1.8)	−28.6 (−19.5)
Record low °C (°F)	−41.7 (−43.1)	−43.1 (−45.6)	−34.7 (−30.5)	−24.3 (−11.7)	−6.9 (19.6)	−3.5 (25.7)	0.0 (32.0)	−3.7 (25.3)	−8.8 (16.2)	−16.8 (1.8)	−28.6 (−19.5)	−36.2 (−33.2)	−43.1 (−45.6)
Source 1: FMI normals 1991-2020
Source 2: Record highs and lows

== Demographics ==
Population size 1990–2025
Year	Population
1990	21,648
1995	22,895
2000	23,858
2005	25,935
2010	28,311
2015	28,919
2020	29,160
2025	28,852

== Sights ==
- Vihti Church, an 18th-century lutheran church
- St. Bridget's Church, a medieval church ruin
- Vihti Museum, history museum showcasing local history of the municipality
- Lake Hiidenvesi, one of the largest lakes of the Uusimaa region

== Friendship cities ==
- Fukui Prefecture, Japan (since 1980)
