= Nuuksio National Park =

National park in Uusimaa, Finland

- IUCN category II (national park)
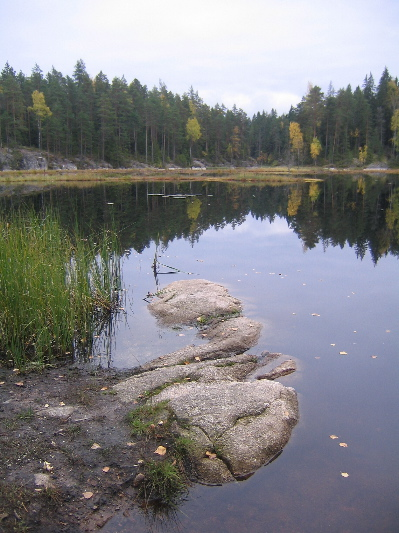
- Mustalampi Lake

- Location within Finland
- Location: Uusimaa, Finland
- Coordinates: 60°18′27″N 24°29′57″E
- Area: 53 km^{2} (20 sq mi)
- Established: 1994
- Visitors: 312,600 (in 2024)
- Governing body: Metsähallitus
- Website: https://www.luontoon.fi/en/destinations/nuuksio-national-park

Nuuksio National Park (Finnish: Nuuksion kansallispuisto, Swedish: Noux nationalpark) is one of Finland's 40 national parks. Established in 1994, the park spreads over an area of forests and lakes in Espoo, Kirkkonummi and Vihti. North-west from Helsinki, it is the second-closest national park to the capital behind the recently established Sipoonkorpi National Park. The name is derived from the Nuuksio district of Espoo.

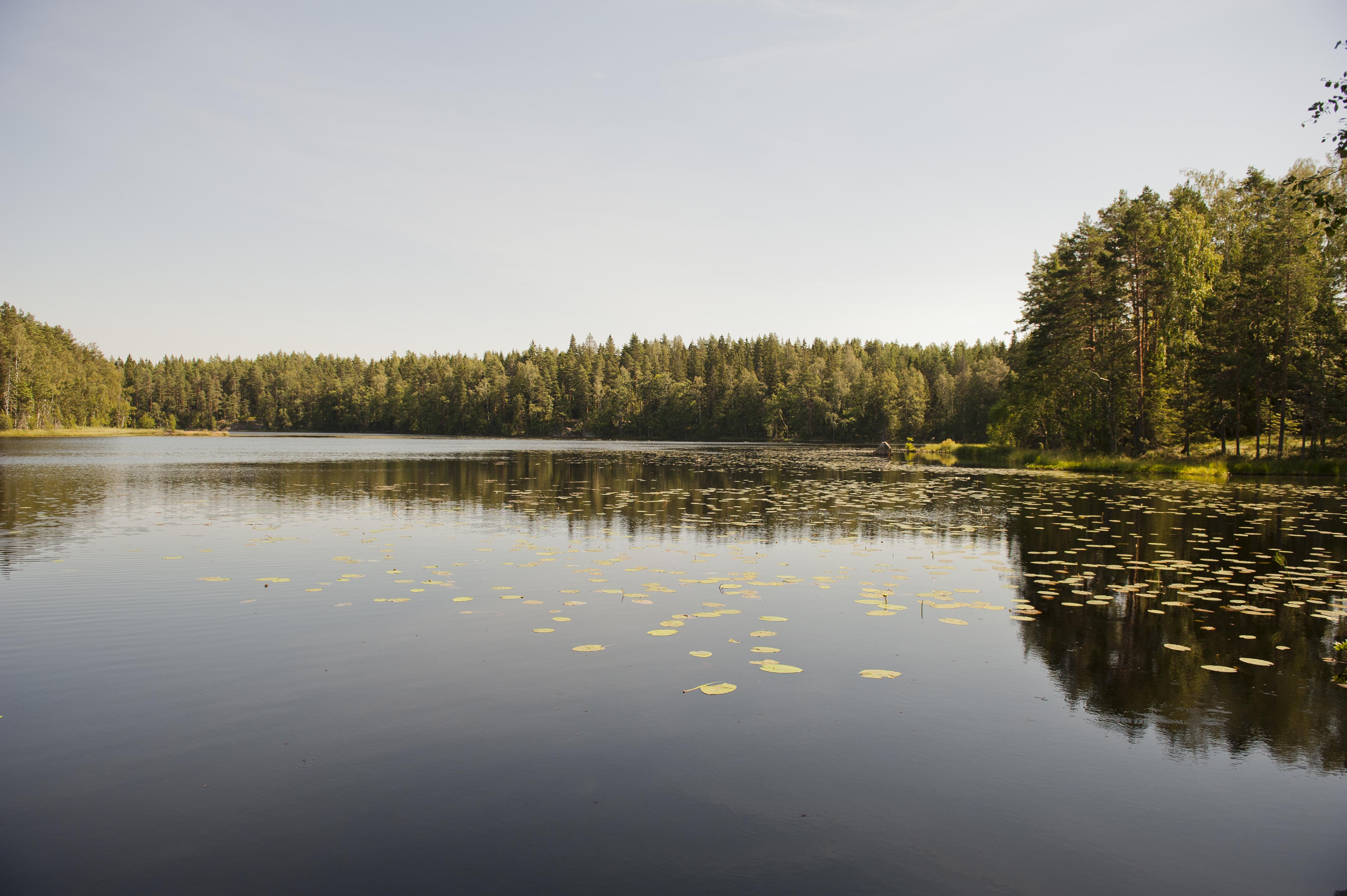
One of Nuuksio's lakes, surrounded by forest.

Located less than 30 kilometers from downtown Helsinki, the park can easily be reached by public transportation. Bus 245A leaves from Espoon keskus to Nuuksionpää and Kattila during daytime.

Within the park there are eight marked trails for hiking. These trails vary in length and difficulty, being between 1.5 km and 17 km long. In addition, there are 30 km of biking trails and 22 km of horse riding trails. Designated spots for grilling, camping and skiing are scattered across the park.

The Siberian flying squirrel (Pteromys volans) is the emblem of the national park due to their high population density in the park.

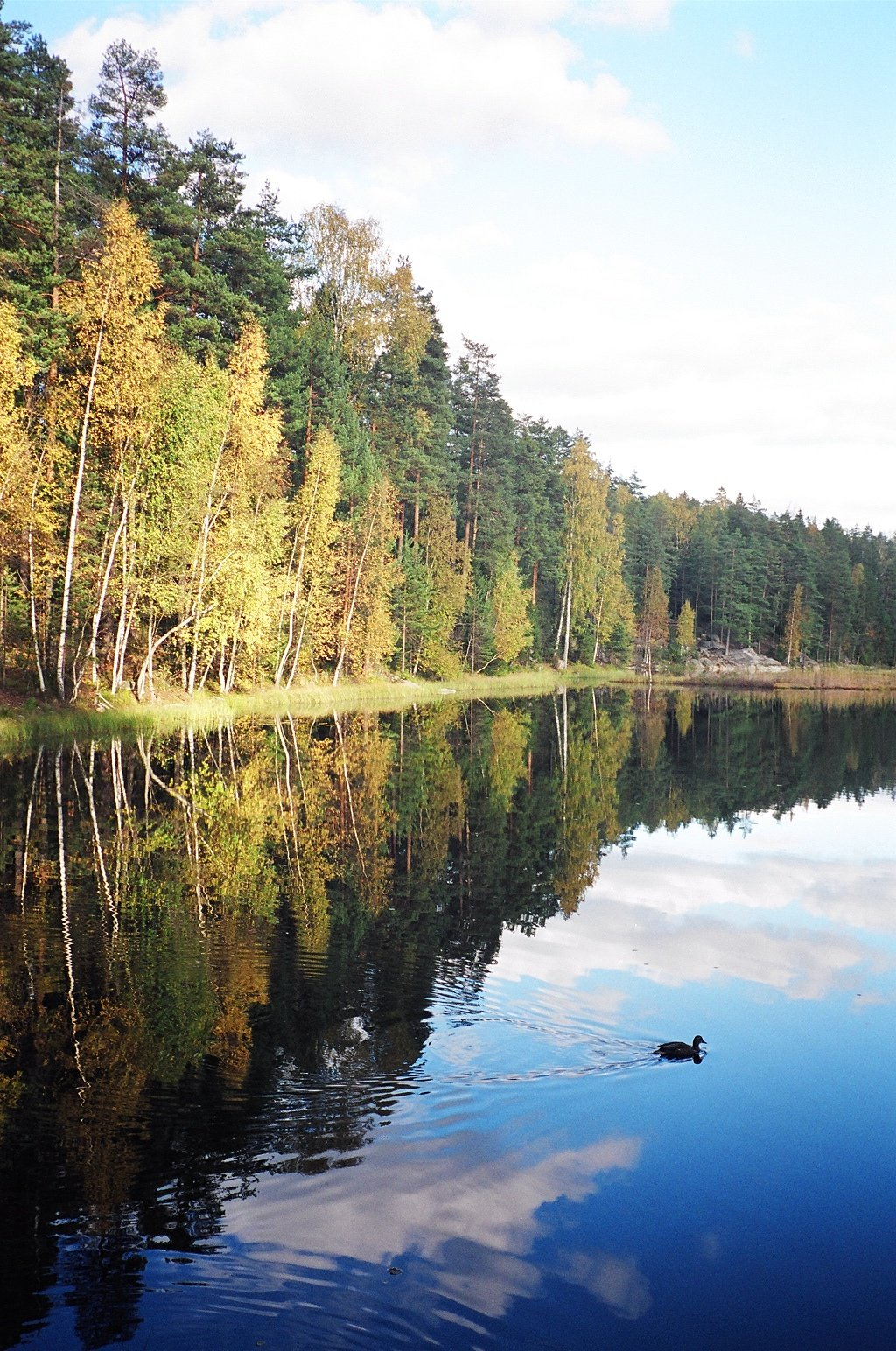
Nuuksio in the autumn

The national park comprises the westernmost part of the so-called Nuuksio lake highlands. Dozens of endangered or near threatened species animals, plants and fungi are known to inhabit the area, for instance the Siberian flying squirrel, the European nightjar and the woodlark.

== Area ==
Nuuksio National Park is the westernmost part of the so-called Nuuksio Lake Upland. Its landforms are dominated by valleys and ravines shaped by the last ice age, as well as rugged, rocky hills covered by lichen and sparse pine forest. In some places, the area also has old-growth forests, bogs, and heritage biotopes, especially meadows. At its highest point, the area reaches an elevation of 110 metres (360 ft) above sea level.

Most of Nuuksio National Park was created by combining the forest area of the Tervalampi manor, previously a state-owned hiking area, with the Nuuksionpää outdoor recreation area and the southern part of the Salmi outdoor recreation area, both acquired by the City of Helsinki in the 1960s. The remaining parts of the Salmi outdoor recreation area, north of the national park, are still owned by the City of Helsinki.

There are about thirty lakes in the main area of Nuuksio National Park. The park is bordered by Nuuksion Pitkäjärvi on its southeastern edge and by Tervalampi in the west. The western and northwestern lakes of Nuuksio include Kurjolampi, Saarilampi, and Ruuhilampi, among others. The northernmost point of the national park is located on the southern shores of Lake Pikku-Parikas.

The area of the national park is not contiguous; in addition to the main area described above, it includes several smaller sections, such as the areas surrounding lakes Saarijärvi and Suolikas, as well as a small strip of land between Velskolan Pitkäjärvi and Kattilajärvi.

== Services ==
In addition to campfire and camping sites, Nuuksio National Park has covered grilling shelters where it is possible to make a fire, except during a forest fire warning.

The Finnish Nature Centre Haltia, opened in 2013, is located next to the park in the district of Nuuksio. The centre offers exhibitions related to Finnish nature and national parks, a shop, a restaurant, and meeting and sauna facilities.

Four marked nature trails of varying lengths (2–7.5 km) start from the nature hut in Haukkalampi. Duckboards or stairways have been built in the most difficult-to-traverse sections to assist hikers and protect the nature from erosion. Recycling points are located at Kattila and Haukkalampi. There is also a water tap on the wall of the Haukkalampi nature cabin.

Nuuksio National Park also has twelve free-of-charge tent camping areas. Nine of these camping areas are equipped with a campfire ring, a woodshed with an axe, and a dry toilet. Free camping areas are located at Mustalampi, Haukanholma, Holma-Saarijärvi, Isoholma, and Saarilampi, for example.

== See also ==
- Districts of Espoo
- List of national parks of Finland
  - Sipoonkorpi National Park
- Protected areas of Finland
