= Norgani =

Norgani Hotels ASA
- Company type: Public
- Industry: Real estate
- Headquarters: Oslo, Norway
- Key people: Eva Eriksson (CEO); Jan Petter Storetvedt (Chairman)

Norgani (OSE: NORGAN) is Europe's fifth largest hotel real estate investment company that owns 70 hotels throughout the Nordic Region. Operation of the hotels is performed by the Scandic Hotels, Choice Hotels and Rezidor chains. The company is headquartered in Oslo, Norway and was listed on the Oslo Stock Exchange. The largest owner is Oslo Co-operative Housing Association (12%).

The company was delisted from the stock exchange when it was acquired by Oslo Properties AS, a company owned by Norwegian Property, EQT, A Wilhelmsen Group and a financial investor syndicate.
