= Vihtijärvi =

Village in Uusimaa, Finland

Coordinates: 60°31′29″N 24°32′33″E

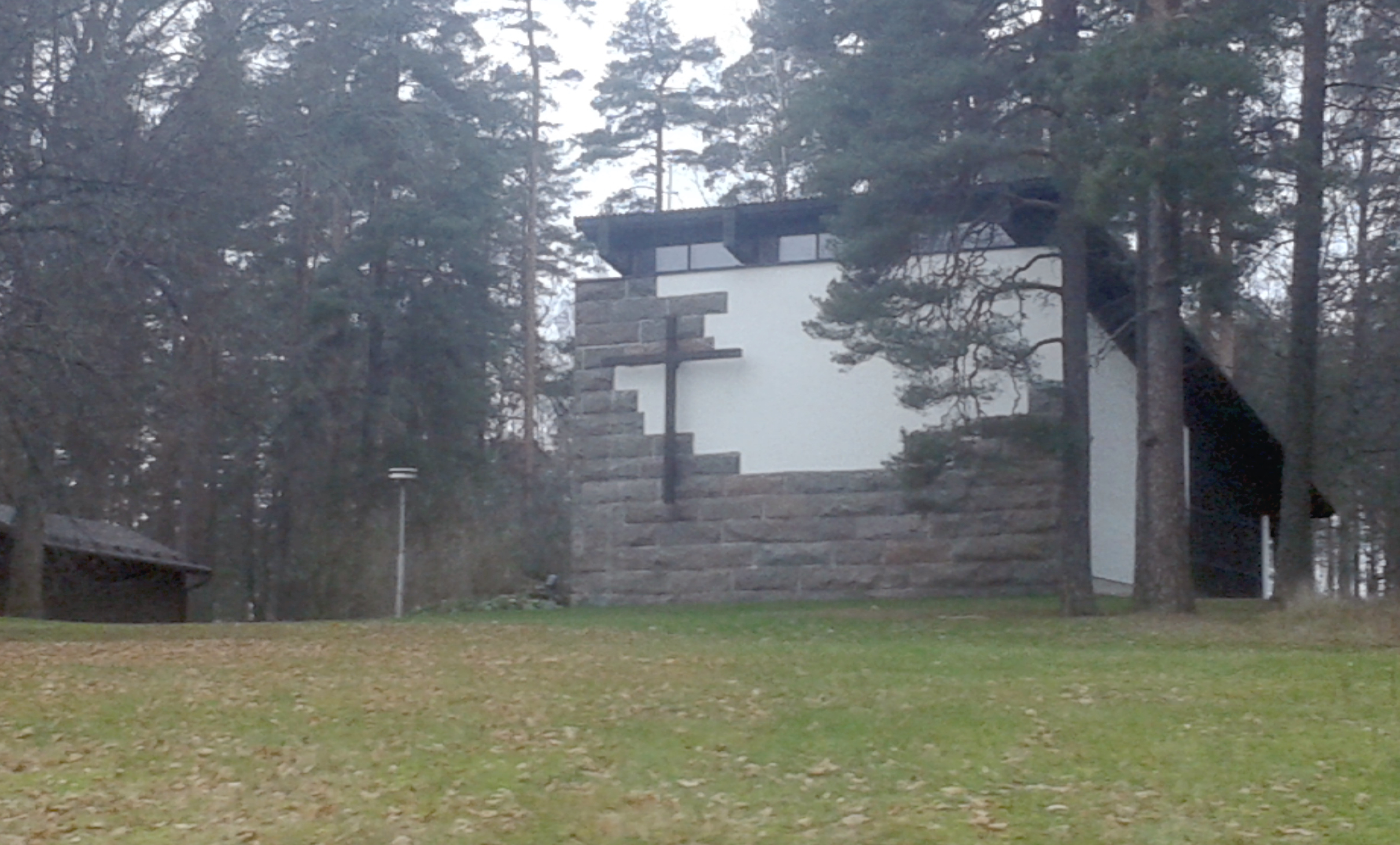
A chapel in Vihtijärvi

Vihtijärvi (Finnish pronunciation: [ˈʋihtiˌjærʋi]) is a village in the northeast part of Vihti municipality, Finland, between the borders of Nurmijärvi, Hyvinkää, Loppi and Karkkila. The population is about 500. The regional road 132 (Mt 132) between Loppi and Klaukkala runs through the village. The nearest lakes are Niemenjärvi and Vihtijärvi, from the latter of which the village got its name.

Vihtijärvi has its own school, a chapel, a cemetery and also a roadside restaurant. There are no grocery stores in the village; the nearest store is located in the village of Röykkä, about 5 kilometres (3.1 mi) to the south.

Hiiskula Manor is located in Vihtijärvi and was owned by Freirherr Artur Vilhelm Klinckowström, baron and major general of the Russian Imperial Army, from 1845 to 1860.

== See also ==
- Kytäjä
- Vihti (village)
