= Lohjanjärvi =

Lake in Finland

Lohjanjärvi Lojo sjö
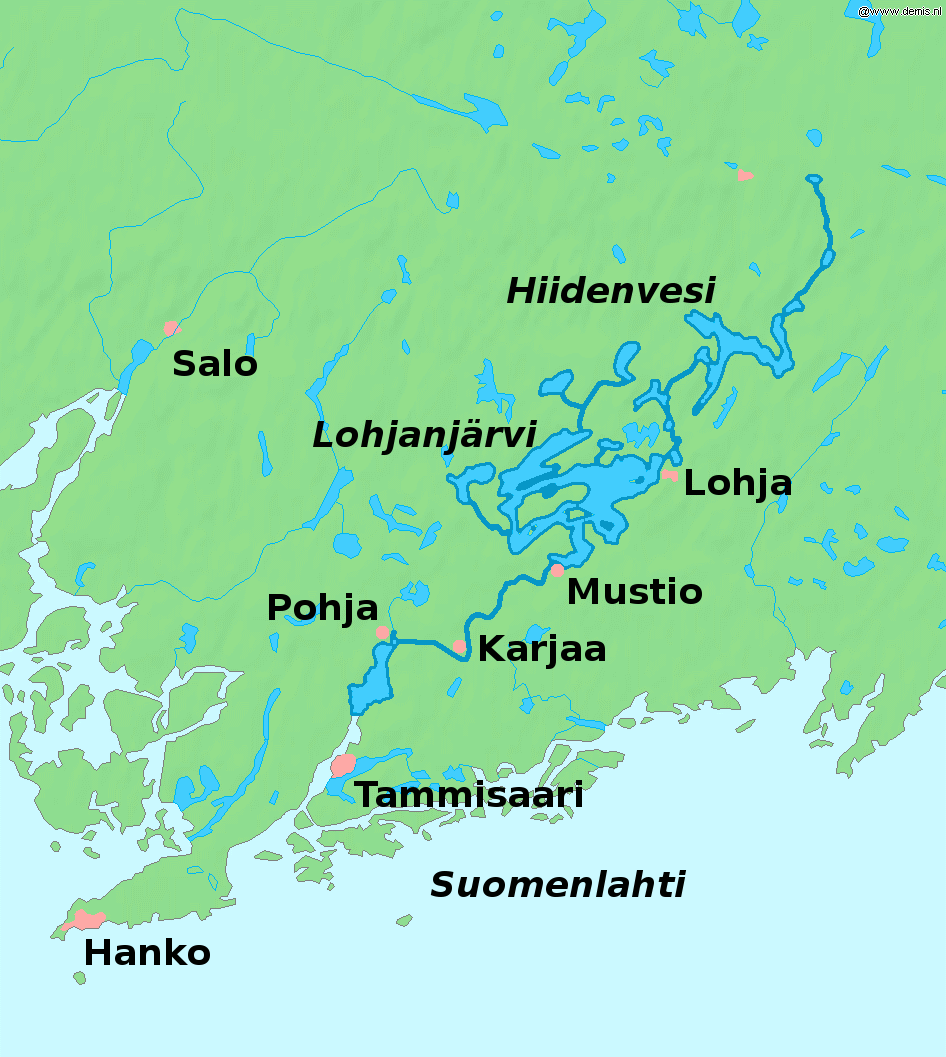

- Location within Finland
- Coordinates: 60°15′N 23°55′E
- Type: Lake
- Catchment area: Karjaanjoki
- Basin countries: Finland
- Surface area: 88.218 km^{2} (34.061 sq mi)
- Average depth: 12.68 m (41.6 ft)
- Max. depth: 54.88 m (180.1 ft)
- Water volume: 1.119 km^{3} (907,000 acre⋅ft)
- Shore length^{1}: 331.81 km (206.18 mi)
- Surface elevation: 31.6 m (104 ft)
- Frozen: December-April
- Islands: Lohjansaari
- Settlements: Lohja
- ^{1} Shore length is not a well-defined measure.

Lohjanjärvi (Swedish: Lojo sjö; also known as Lake Lohja) is a lake located in the Uusimaa region of Finland. The majority of the lake is located within the borders of the city of Lohja and smaller parts in the municipality of Karjalohja and in the city of Raseborg. The lake drains into the Gulf of Finland through Mustionjoki (also known as Karjaanjoki, Swedish: Svartån). Together with Hiidenvesi, which drains into the gulf from the north, Lohjanjärvi is a part of the Karjaanjoki basin.

== See also ==
- List of lakes in Finland
- Hiidenvesi
