= Finnish regional road 120 =

Road in Uusimaa region, Finland

Regional Road 120
- Yhdystie 120 (Finnish); Förbindelseväg 120 (Swedish)
- Vihti Road: Vihdintie; Vichtisvägen
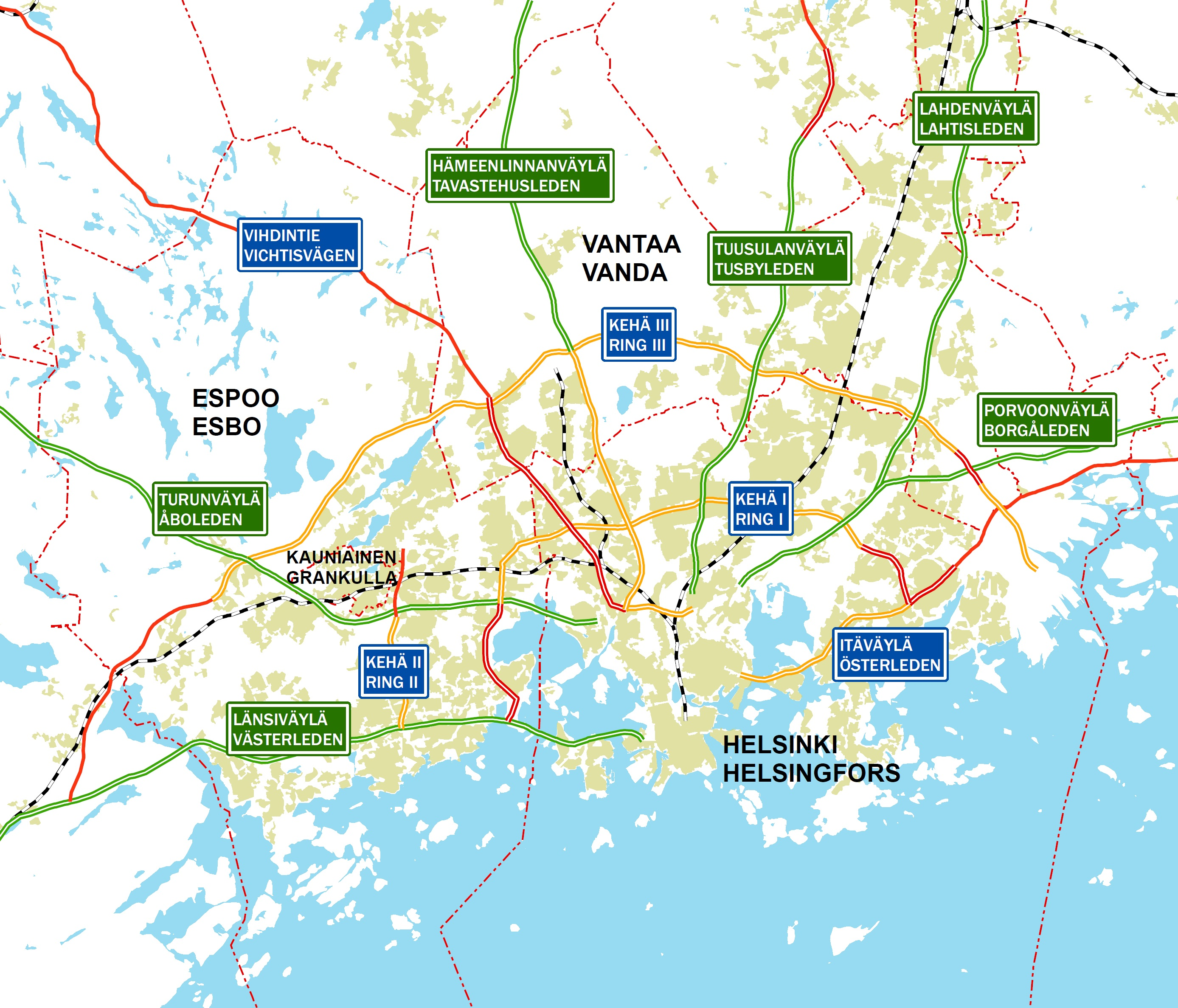

Route information
- Length: 46 km (29 mi)
- Existed: 1957–present

Major junctions
- From: Helsinki
- To: Vihti

Location
- Country: Finland

Highway system
- Highways in Finland

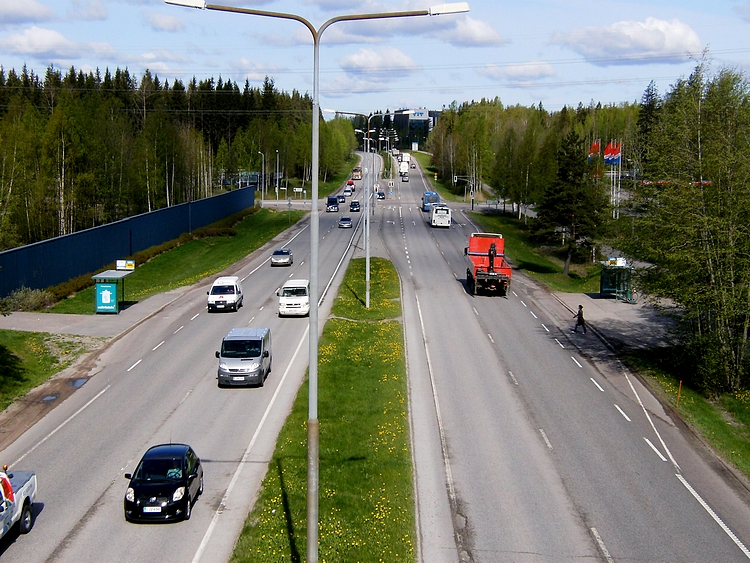
Road 120 in Konala, Helsinki

Finnish regional road 120 (Finnish: Seututie 120, Swedish: Regionalväg 120), or Vihti Road (Finnish: Vihdintie, Swedish: Vichtisvägen), is a regional road from Haaga in Helsinki to Maikkala in Vihti. The road is part of the former Pori Highway. Regional road 120 was originally intended as the main road connection from Helsinki to Pori via the Vihti church village, but when it was completed, the road was already prone to accidents due to its complexity, hilliness and narrowness. However, the Helsinki-side section of the road up to Ring III has later been widened to four lanes, but the beginning of Vihdintie in Etelä-Haaga from Mannerheimintie to Haaga roundabout is street-like. The regional road also passes Highway 25 at the village of Otalampi.

Significant commercial centers along Vihdintie include the Ristikko Shopping Centre in the Konala district.

== History ==
Vihdintie is part of the former highway 2 between Helsinki and Pori. Its construction began in 1942, but it was not until 1957 that it was fully completed from Helsinki to Karkkila. The road initially became known as the "Tanner Road" because Väinö Tanner, the Prime Minister of Finland, had a farm in northern Espoo along the road and has allegedly influenced its alignment. As the road was quite hilly, winding and full of visual obstacles, it was no longer considered to meet the requirements of the highway in the 1960s. Therefore, the new alignment of Highway 2 leading to Pori was built in the 1970s at a higher level.

== See also ==
- Lopentie
- Turuntie
