= Hiidenvesi =

Lake in Uusimaa, Finland

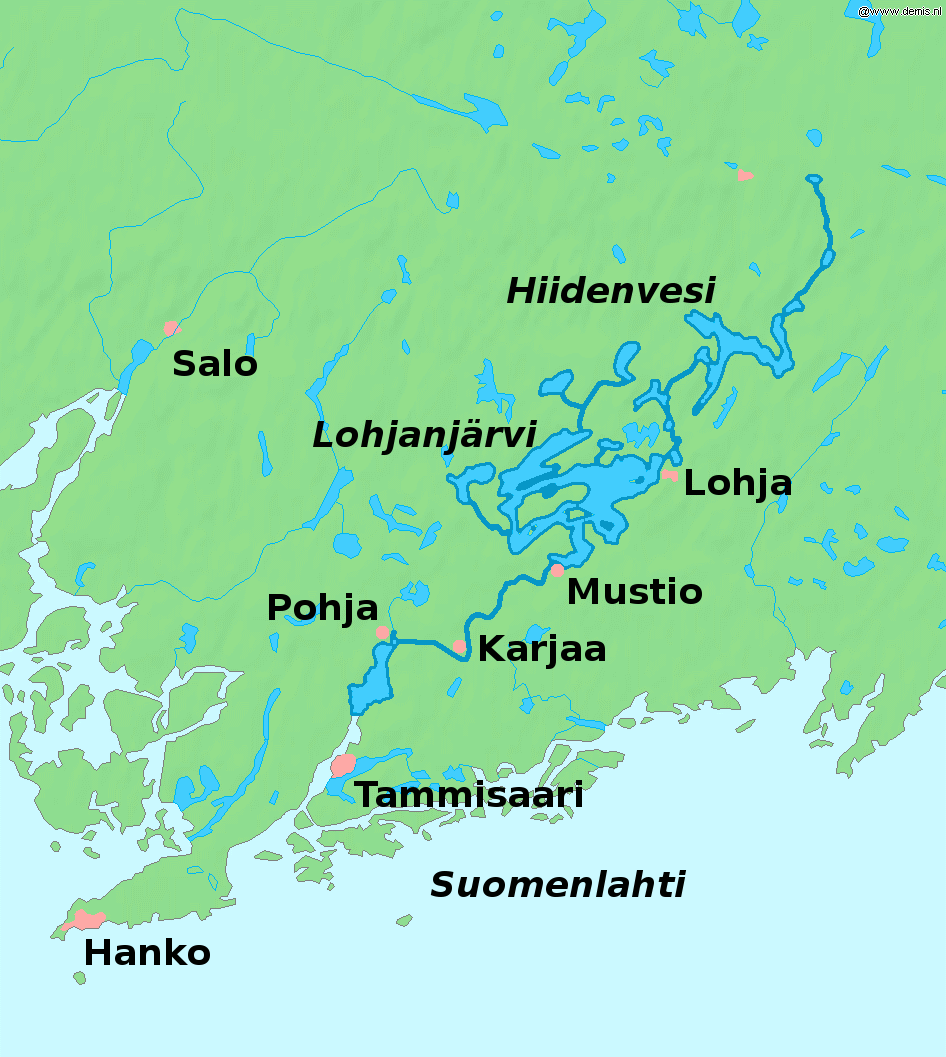

- Location within Finland
- Location: Uusimaa
- Coordinates: 60°22′30″N 024°11′30″E
- Catchment area: Karjaanjoki
- Basin countries: Finland
- Surface area: 29.09 km^{2} (11.23 sq mi)
- Average depth: 6.68 m (21.9 ft)
- Max. depth: 29.38 m (96.4 ft)
- Water volume: 0.195 km^{3} (158,000 acre⋅ft)
- Shore length^{1}: 100.87 km (62.68 mi)
- Surface elevation: 32 m (105 ft)
- Frozen: December–April
- Islands: Papinsaari
- Settlements: Vihti, Lohja
- ^{1} Shore length is not a well-defined measure.

Hiidenvesi (Finnish pronunciation: [ˈhiːdenˌʋesi]; lit. 'hiisi water') is the second largest lake in the Uusimaa region in Finland. The biggest part of the lake is located in the municipality of Vihti and smaller parts in the town of Lohja. The lake drains through the Väänteenjoki River into lake Lohjanjärvi. Both lakes are part of the Karjaanjoki (Swedish: Svartån) basin that drains into the Gulf of Finland.

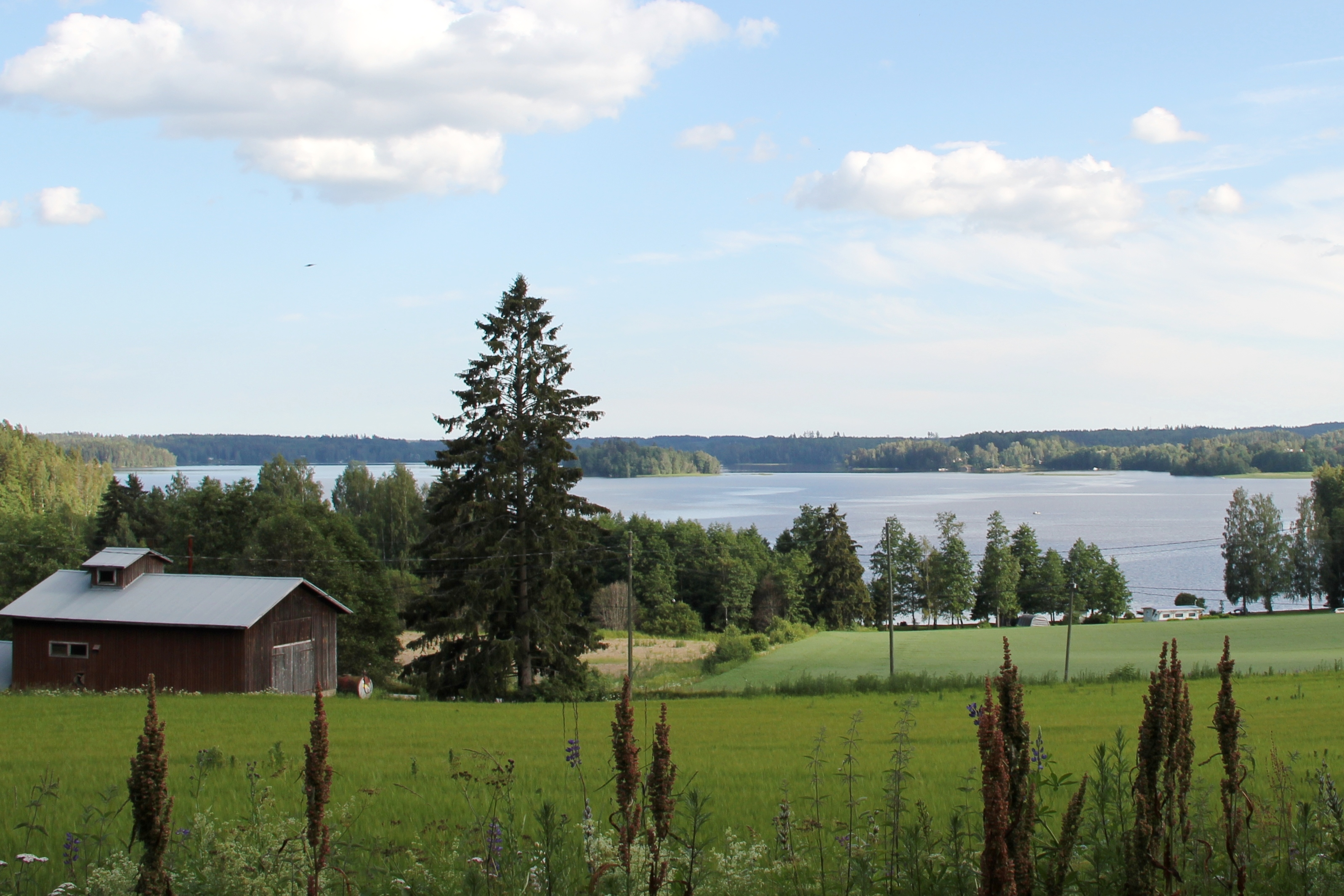
Hiidenvesi in Retlahti, Pusula, Lohja. To the south.

== See also ==
- List of lakes in Finland
- Lohjanjärvi
