= Tuomarila railway station =

Railway station in Espoo, Finland

Tuomarila Domsby
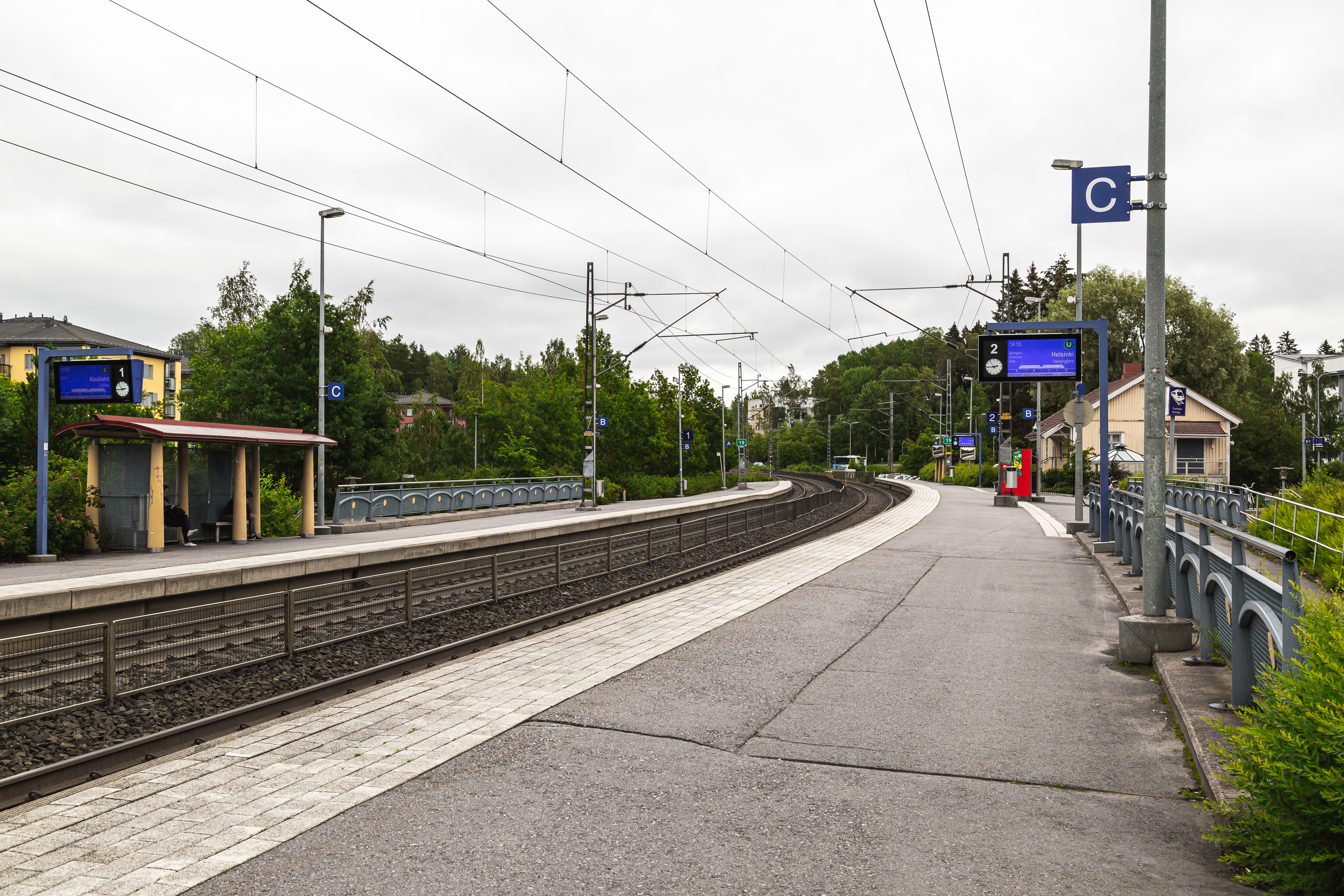

General information
- Location: Tuomarilantie 4, 02760; Espoon keskus, Espoo; Finland
- Coordinates: 60°12′21″N 024°40′54″E
- System: Helsinki commuter rail station
- Owner: Finnish Transport Infrastructure Agency
- Operator: VR on behalf of HSL
- Line: Rantarata
- Platforms: 2 (side platforms)
- Tracks: 2

Construction
- Structure type: Ground station
- Parking: Yes
- Cycle facilities: Yes
- Accessible: Yes

Other information
- Station code: Trl
- Fare zone: C
- Classification: Halt

History
- Opened: 1931; 95 years ago

Passengers
- 2019: 1,102,221

Services
Preceding station	Helsinki commuter rail	Following station
Koivuhovi towards Helsinki	U	Espoo towards Kirkkonummi
Koivuhovi towards Helsinki	L	Espoo towards Kirkkonummi
Koivuhovi towards Helsinki	E	Espoo towards Kauklahti
Location

Tuomarila (Finnish) or Domsby (Swedish) is a station on the VR commuter rail network located in Espoo, Finland.

The station is served by the commuter trains E from Helsinki to Kauklahti and U (daytime) and L (nighttime) between Helsinki and Kirkkonummi. Tuomarila is located between Koivuhovi and Espoo stations. It is approximately nineteen kilometres from central Helsinki.

The station has two platforms, and was opened in 1931. The station is unstaffed. The old station building is no longer open to the public, as it is in private ownership and as of 2021, used as a private home.

== Departure tracks ==
Tuomarila railway station has two platform tracks.

- Track 1 is used by commuter trains U and L to Kirkkonummi and E to Kauklahti.
- Track 2 is used by commuter trains U, L and E to Helsinki.
