= Kera railway station =

Railway station in Espoo, Finland

Kera
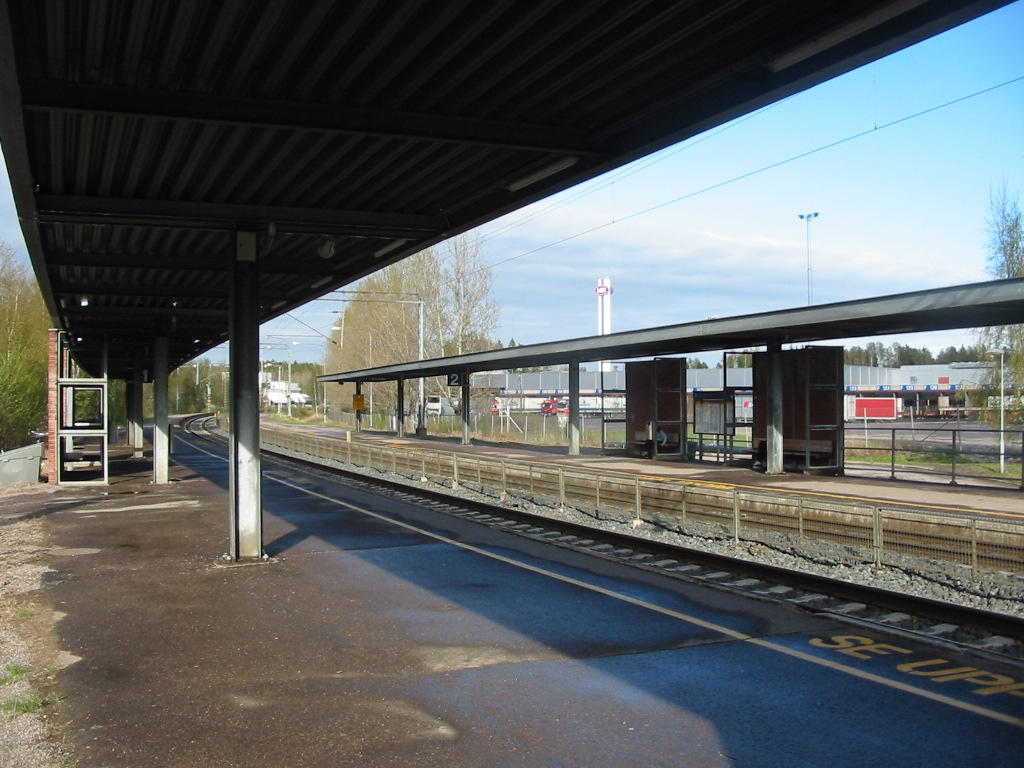

General information
- Location: Kutojantie 17, 02630; Espoo; Finland
- Coordinates: 60°12′58″N 24°45′14″E
- System: Helsinki commuter rail station
- Owner: Finnish Transport Infrastructure Agency
- Operator: VR Group on behalf of HSL
- Line: Rantarata
- Platforms: 2 (side platforms)
- Tracks: 2

Other information
- Station code: Kea
- Fare zone: B

History
- Opened: 11 April 1946; 80 years ago

Passengers
- 2019: 688,430

Services
| Preceding station | Helsinki commuter rail | Following station |
|---|---|---|
| Kilo towards Helsinki | U | Kauniainen towards Kirkkonummi |
| Kilo towards Helsinki | L | Kauniainen towards Kirkkonummi |
| Kilo towards Helsinki | E | Kauniainen towards Kauklahti |
Location

Kera is a station on the Helsinki commuter rail network located in the neighborhood of the same name in the city of Espoo in Finland. It is situated between stations Kilo railway station and Kauniainen railway station. It is located about 15 kilometres (9.3 mi) to the northwest/west of Helsinki Central railway station.

== History ==
The station is named after a ceramics factory, which took in clay from a nearby field. The factory's names have included:

- Viherlaakson kattotiili OY
- Saviteollisuus OY
- Grankullan Saviteollisuus OY
- Kera OY (from 1936)

The factory's products have included flower pots, Finnish rooster-whistles, pans, trays, tea pots, ash trays and air moisturisers. Particular attention was paid to the usability and stackability of the items.

The factory's business ended in 1958 because of large fires, foreign import of cheap ceramics, the introduction of plastic, and the rise of Arabia as the largest ceramics factory in the Helsinki conurbation.

== Departure tracks ==
Kera railway station has two platform tracks.

- Track 1 is used by commuter trains U and L to Kirkkonummi and E to Kauklahti.
- Track 2 is used by commuter trains U, L and E to Helsinki.
