= Luoma =

Luoma may refer to:

- Luoma (surname)
- LuoMa Highway (羅馬公路), also known as County Road 118, see Provincial Highway 7 (Taiwan)
- Luoma Lake, in Suqian, Jiangsu, China
- Luoma River, an alternative name of the Lianshui River
- Luoma railway station, in Kirkkonummi, Finland

== See also ==
- Rome, the capital city of Italy, written as 羅馬 or 罗马 for Chinese Mandarin
