= Kauniainen railway station =

Railway station in Kauniainen, Finland

Kauniainen Grankulla
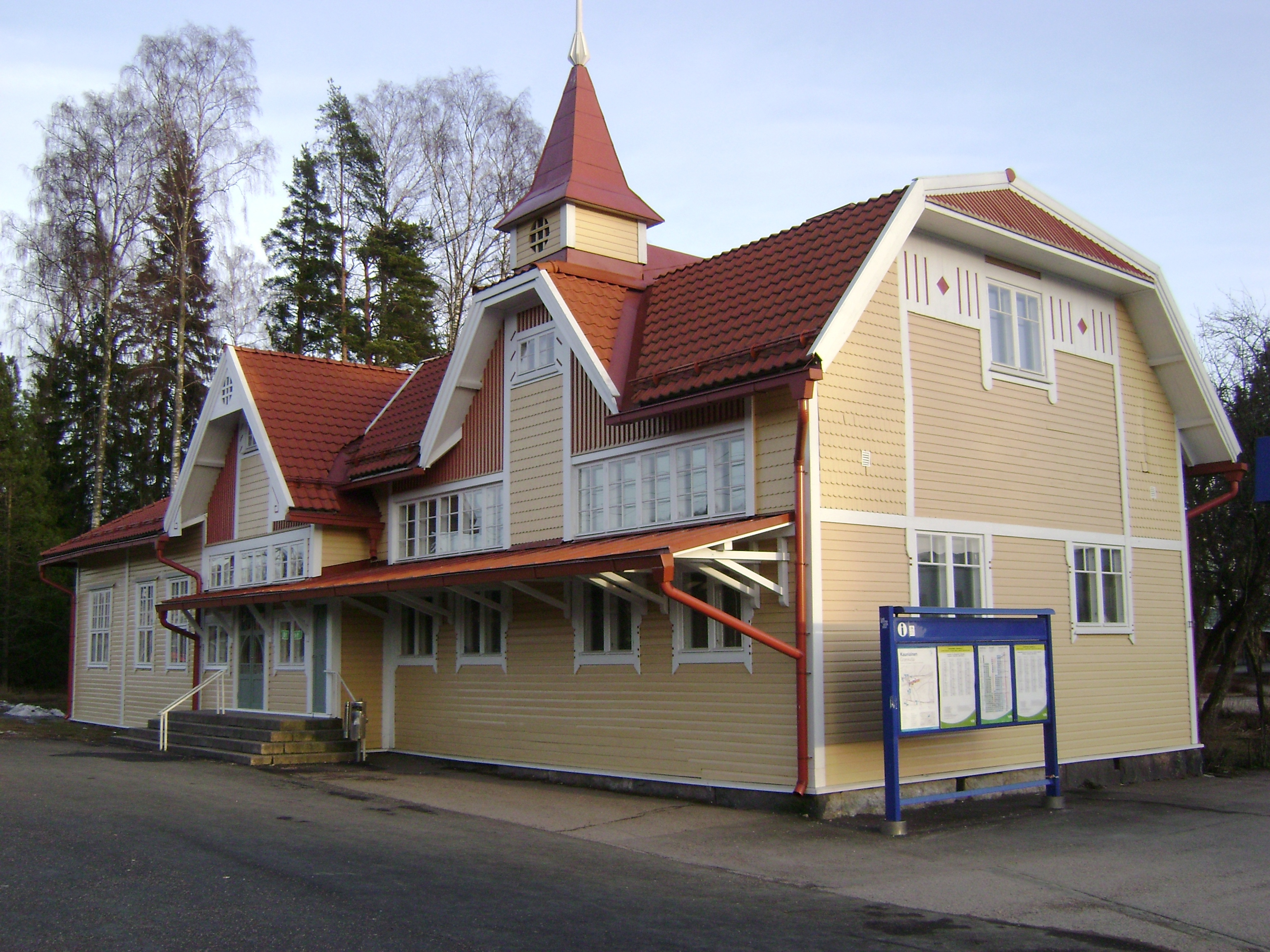

General information
- Coordinates: 60°12′43″N 024°43′55″E
- System: Helsinki commuter rail station
- Owner: Finnish Transport Agency
- Lines: U, L, E
- Platforms: 2
- Connections: bus lines 118N (night bus), 224, 533, 548, 549

Construction
- Structure type: ground station
- Architect: Bruno Granholm
- Architectural style: Jugendstil

Other information
- Fare zone: B

Passengers
- 2019: 1,282,381

Services
Preceding station	Helsinki commuter rail	Following station
Kera towards Helsinki	U	Koivuhovi towards Kirkkonummi
Kera towards Helsinki	L	Koivuhovi towards Kirkkonummi
Kera towards Helsinki	E	Koivuhovi towards Kauklahti
Location

Kauniainen railway station (Finnish: Kauniaisten rautatieasema, Swedish: Grankulla järnvägsstation) is a station on the Helsinki commuter rail network located in the town of Kauniainen, Finland.

The Finnish Heritage Agency has classified Kauniainen railway station as a nationally significant built cultural environment.

== History ==
At the time when the Rantarata railway line was being built, Kauniainen was still largely unbuilt. However, the first villas were already built on the shore of the Lake Gallträsk by 1901 followed by new villas later. The local district judge, Johan Lönnberg, the owner of the Glims farm, made a request to the railway administration to open a stop at Kauniainen, so that his daughters could get to Helsinki to study. The stop opened named Grankulla back then had a small wooden platform on the northern edge of the railway line and trains stopped there only on demand.

The Jugend (Art Nouveau) style station building was completed in 1908. The architect of the building has not been confirmed, but is thought to be Bruno Granholm. The small tower structure of the building is similar to that on the station building at Kirkniemi railway station at Lohja while the windows, the doors and the porch are similar to the ones of the station building at Lusto railway station at Savonlinna, both of which have been designed by Bruno Granholm.

The commute between Kauniainen and Helsinki was very significant from the very beginning and already in the 1910s there were a couple of times when passenger traffic at Kauniainen was busier compared to the Espoo station. In 1920, Kauniainen became an independent market town. Freight traffic at Kauniainen began in 1907 and increased by the 1960s. Nowadays freight traffic at Kauniainen is much less frequent and mostly focused to the Kera industrial area. The ticket sales office at Kauniainen was closed in 2004.

The station building, still owned by VR, was badly damaged in a fire on August 30 2008.

== Departure tracks ==
At the moment, Kauniainen railway station has two platform tracks for passengers. Platform track 3, which was primarily unused by passenger trains that stop at the station, has been removed.

- Track 1 is used by commuter trains U and L to Kirkkonummi and E to Kauklahti.
- Track 2 is used by commuter trains U, L and E to Helsinki.

== Connections ==
118N (Jorvi–Kamppi, nighttime) 224 (Tuomarila–Leppävaara) 533 (Järvenperä–Matinkylä) 548 (Jupperi–Tapiola) 549 (Jorvi–Tapiola)
