= Tolsa =

Tolsa is a surname, and may refer to:

- Arto Tolsa (1945–1989), Finnish footballer
- Janne Tolsa (born 1970), Finnish heavy metal musician
- Jari Tolsa (born 1981), Swedish ice hockey player, nephew of Arto Tolsa
- Xavier Tolsa (born 1966), Spanish mathematician

== See also ==
- Manuel Tolsá (1757–1816), Spanish architect and sculptor
- Tolsa railway station, a Helsinki commuter rail station in Kirkkonummi, Finland
