= Pelto =

Pelto may refer to:

- Jonathan Pelto, American politician
- Mauri S. Pelto, American professor
- Pelto railway station, in Espoo, Finland
