= Koivuhovi railway station =

Railway station in Kauniainen, Finland

Koivuhovi Björkgård
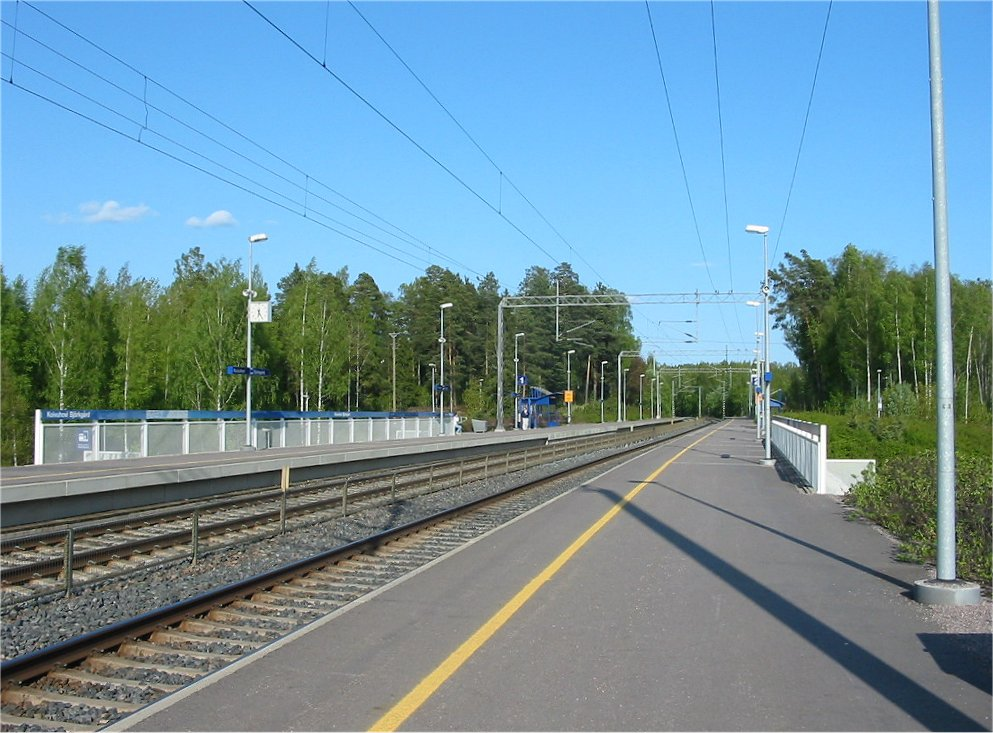

General information
- Location: Ullanmäentie 2, 02750; Espoo; Finland
- Coordinates: 60°12′25″N 24°42′7″E
- System: Helsinki commuter rail station
- Owner: Finnish Transport Infrastructure Agency
- Operator: VR Group on behalf of HSL
- Line: Rantarata
- Platforms: 2 side platforms
- Tracks: 2

Other information
- Station code: Kvh
- Fare zone: B

History
- Opened: 1997; 29 years ago

Passengers
- 2019: 730,277

Services
Preceding station	Helsinki commuter rail	Following station
Kauniainen towards Helsinki	U	Tuomarila towards Kirkkonummi
Kauniainen towards Helsinki	L	Tuomarila towards Kirkkonummi
Kauniainen towards Helsinki	E	Tuomarila towards Kauklahti
Location

The Koivuhovi railway station (Finnish: Koivuhovin rautatieasema, Swedish: Björkgårds järnvägsstation) is a station on the Helsinki commuter rail network, located between the stations of Kauniainen and Tuomarila. The station was opened in its current form in 1997.

The station is served by the commuter trains E from Helsinki to Kauklahti and U (daytime) and L (nighttime) between Helsinki and Kirkkonummi. The station is approximately 17 kilometres (11 mi) from central Helsinki.

== Departure tracks ==
Koivuhovi railway station has two platform tracks.

- Track 1 is used by commuter trains U and L to Kirkkonummi and E to Kauklahti.
- Track 2 is used by commuter trains U, L and E to Helsinki.
