= Lantmäteriverket =

Lantmäteriverket may refer to:

- National Land Survey of Finland
- National Land Survey of Sweden
