= Luoma railway station =

Railway station in Kirkkonummi, Finland

Coordinates: 60°10′45″N 24°33′37″E

Luoma Bobäck
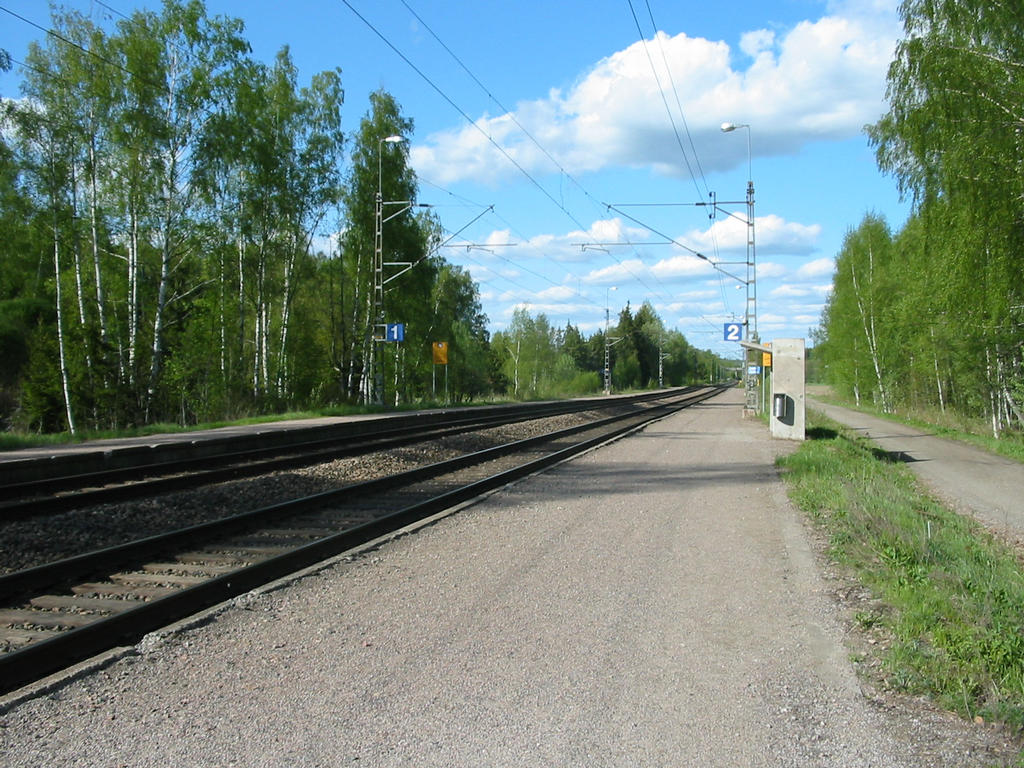

General information
- Location: Luomankuja, 02440 Kirkkonummi
- System: VR station
- Owner: Finnish Transport Agency
- Platforms: 2

Construction
- Structure type: ground station / halt

History
- Opened: 1932
- Closed: 1944
- Rebuilt: 1956
- Electrified: 1969

Passengers
- 145 (Spring 2008)
Location

Luoma (Finnish) or Bobäck (Swedish) was a station on the VR commuter rail network located in Kirkkonummi, Finland, between the stations of Mankki and Masala. The station had two tracks, with track one serving trains towards Kirkkonummi and track two towards Helsinki. The station was opened in 1932, then named as Nokka. In that time, there was another station named Luoma, located about one kilometer closer to Helsinki. The station was out of use between 1944 and 1956, as the Porkkala Cape served as a Soviet military base and the frontier passed through the station. When the original Luoma station was shut down in 1978, the Nokka station was renamed as Luoma. Because of very low number of passengers, the station was closed a day after neighbouring station Mankki on 27 March 2016.

== Connections ==
Only the U and L trains between Kirkkonummi and Helsinki stopped at Luoma, the faster S line did not. The Y train towards Karis ran through the station but did not stop.
