= Mankki railway station =

Former railway station in Espoo, Finland

Mankki Mankby

General information
- Coordinates: 60°11′07″N 024°35′00″E
- System: VR station
- Owner: Finnish Transport Agency
- Platforms: 2

Construction
- Structure type: ground station / halt

History
- Closed: 26 March 2016 (Dismantled in 2022)

Passengers
- 2005: 60-100 daily
Location

Mankki railway station (Finnish: Mankin rautatieasema, Swedish: Mankby hållplats) was a station on the VR commuter rail network located in Espoo, Finland, between the stations of Kauklahti and Luoma. The station had two tracks, with track one serving trains towards Kirkkonummi and the other towards Helsinki. The platform in the direction of Helsinki is a very rare wooden platform. Mankki was the least used station in the Espoo area, with only 60-100 passengers per day before its closure. Because of the very low number of passengers, the station was closed on 27 March 2016.

== Connections ==
Only the U and early morning/late night L trains between Kirkkonummi and Helsinki stopped at Mankki giving approximately an hourly service, but the faster S trains did not stop. The regional Y trains between Karis and Helsinki also passed through the station without stopping.

== Decommissioning ==
14.11.2022 Väylä virasto announced that the level crossing and the rare wooden platform will be removed. This was due to the level crossing infrastructure being old and prone to failures, which caused delays on the busy railway. The dismantling was complete in 2022.
