= Grani (disambiguation) =

Grani is a horse from the Scandinavian heroic legend.

Grani may also refer to:

- Grani (shopping centre), a mall in Kauniainen, Finland
- Plural of "grano", a Maltese currency unit, see Maltese scudo
- Grani (magazine), Russian-language literary magazine known for the publication of Faithful Ruslan
- Grani, an entity in the Digimon Tamers world

== See also ==
- Granni
