= Fizza =

Finnish pizza vending machine chain

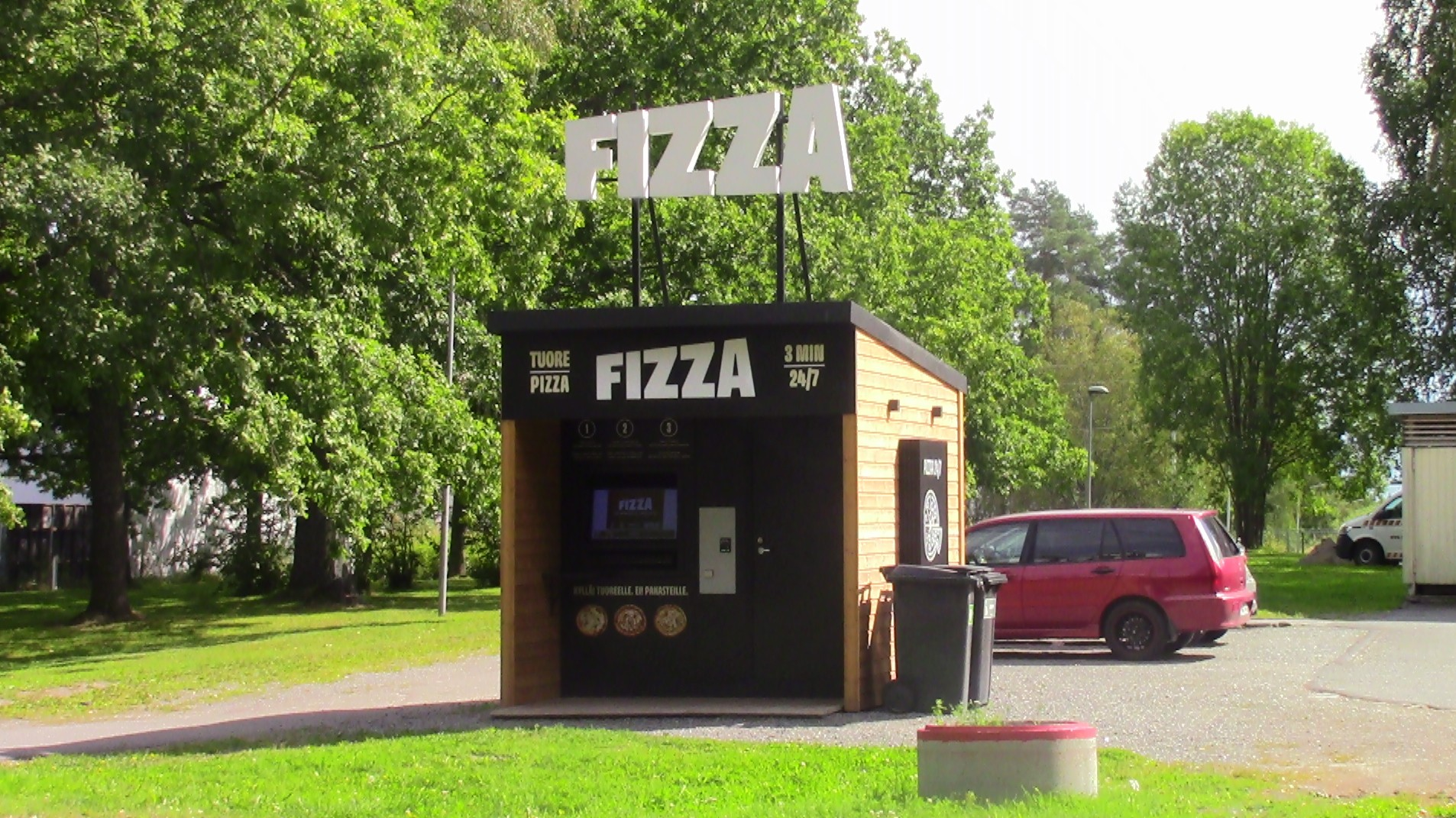
A Fizza automat in Lohja.

Fizza Oy is a Finnish concept of automats serving pizza. The first automat was opened in Kauniainen in 2021. The pizzas are baked by hand in the company's central kitchen in Koivuhaka, Vantaa. The pizzas are stored in the automat at a temperature of 3 °C. After its first month of operation, the company achieved a world record by selling almost 4,800 pizzas in one month. In 2022 Fizza opened its first pizza automats in Sweden and the Czech Republic.
