= Jorvas railway station =

Railway station in Kirkkonummi, Finland

Jorvas
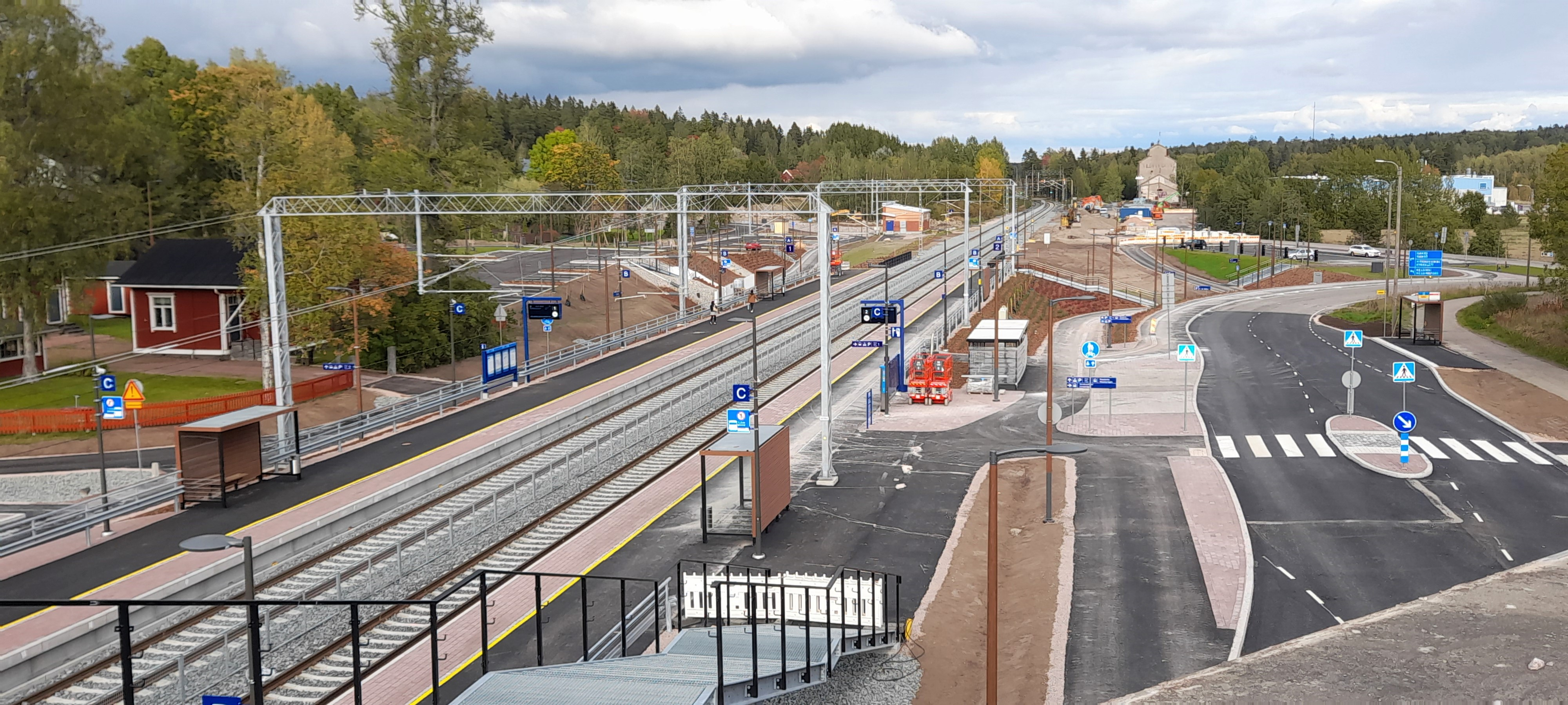

General information
- Location: Jorvaksenkaari, 02420; Jorvas, Kirkkonummi; Finland
- Coordinates: 60.137824°N 24.512011°E
- System: Helsinki commuter rail station
- Owner: Finnish Transport Agency
- Line: L U
- Platforms: 2

Construction
- Structure type: ground station

Other information
- Fare zone: D

Passengers
- 2019: 112,232

Services
Preceding station	Helsinki commuter rail	Following station
Masala towards Helsinki	U	Tolsa towards Kirkkonummi
Masala towards Helsinki	L	Tolsa towards Kirkkonummi
Location

Jorvas railway station is a railway halt on the Helsinki commuter rail network located in the town of Kirkkonummi, Finland, between the Masala and Tolsa stations. The station is served by Helsinki commuter rail L and U trains.

== History ==
Jorvas railway station originally a small stop (known as laituri in the old classification of railway stations in Finland used until 1969) operating under the Masala railway station. The Plattformskjul III-type station building designed by architect Bruno Granholm was completed in 1903 and expanded in 1933 with the plans of architect Jarl Ungern. The station remained in the Porkkala Naval Base leased to Soviet Union in 1944 and was re-opened for Finnish train traffic in 1956, as the naval base was returned to Finland.

After the re-opening, the station functioned as a laiturivaihde (a non-independent, staffed station, usually operating under another nearby station, serving both passenger and freight traffic) for a short while in 1961–1968 and after that as a seisakevaihde (an unstaffed stop for both passenger and freight traffic). Freight traffic at the station ceased in 1987. The station building has since been demolished.

== Connections ==
- U line trains (Helsinki–Kirkkonummi–Helsinki)
- L line trains (Helsinki–Kirkkonummi–Helsinki, nighttime)

== Departure tracks ==
Jorvas railway station has two staggered platform tracks.

- Track 1 is used by commuter trains U and L to Kirkkonummi.
- Track 2 is used by commuter trains U and L to Helsinki.
