= Masala, Kirkkonummi =

Village in Kirkkonummi, Finland

Coordinates: 60°09′N 24°32′E

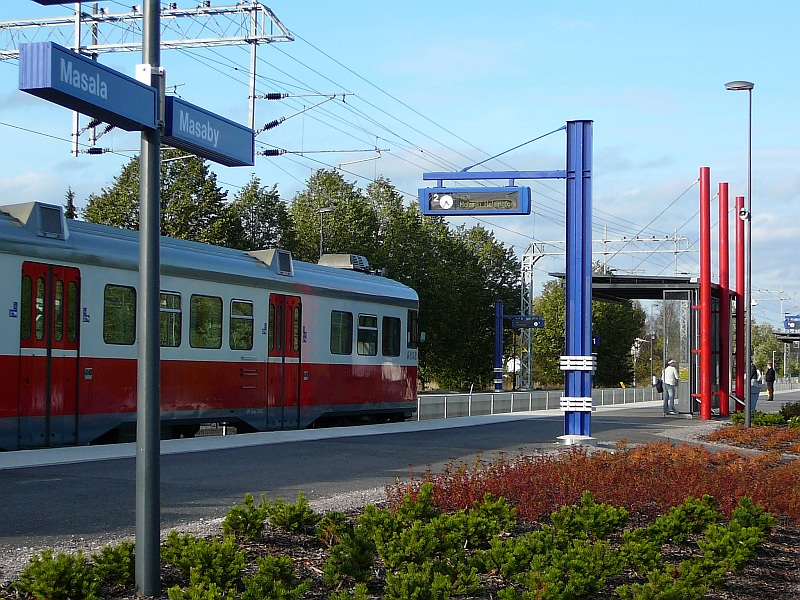
The railway station of Masala at Kirkkonummi.

Masala (Swedish: Masaby) is a village of 4,853 inhabitants in Kirkkonummi municipality. It is located in the western Uusimaa region, in southern Finland, just outside the Helsinki Metropolitan Area. Masala railway station, a station on the Helsinki commuter rail network is located in Masala. The Finnish Geodetic Institute also is located there.
