= Finnish Geospatial Research Institute =

Finnish research institute under the National Land Survey

Coordinates: 60°09′40″N 24°32′54″E

The Finnish Geospatial Research Institute (Finnish: Paikkatietokeskus), formerly Finnish Geodetic Institute (FGI, Finnish: Geodeettinen laitos, Swedish: Geodetiska institutet) is a research institute in Finland specializing in geodesy and geospatial information science and technology. It merged into the National Land Survey of Finland in 2015, when its name was changed. It is located in Masala, Kirkkonummi.

== History ==
The FGI was founded in 1918. The institute creates and maintains national coordinate, height, and gravity systems. It also participates in projects that try to advance spatial data infrastructure and conducts research on geodynamics, advanced spatial data and remote sensing and photogrammetry. The institute also has a statutory responsibility to maintain the national standards of acceleration of free fall and geodetic length.

== Organization ==
The FGI is currently divided into four departments:

- Geodesy and Geodynamics
- Geoinformatics and Cartography
- Remote Sensing and Photogrammetry
- Navigation and Positioning
