= Alexandra Olsson =

Finnish handball player (born 1998)

Personal information
- Nationality: Finnish
- Born: 5 April 1998 (age 28) Kauniainen, Finland
- Height: 1.74 m (5 ft 9 in)

Sport
- Sport: Handball
- Position: Goalkeeper
- Current club: HIFK Handboll
- Number: 24

Senior clubs
- Years: Team
- 2016-: HIFK Handboll
National team
- Years: Team
- –: Finland
Medal record
Women's handball
Representing Finland

Alexandra Olsson (born 5 April 1998) is a Finnish handball player for HIFK Handboll and the Finnish national team. Her main position is a goalkeeper
