= Kauniainen =

Town in Uusimaa, Finland

Kauniainen Kauniainen (Finnish) Grankulla (Swedish)
- Town
- Kauniaisten kaupunki Grankulla stad
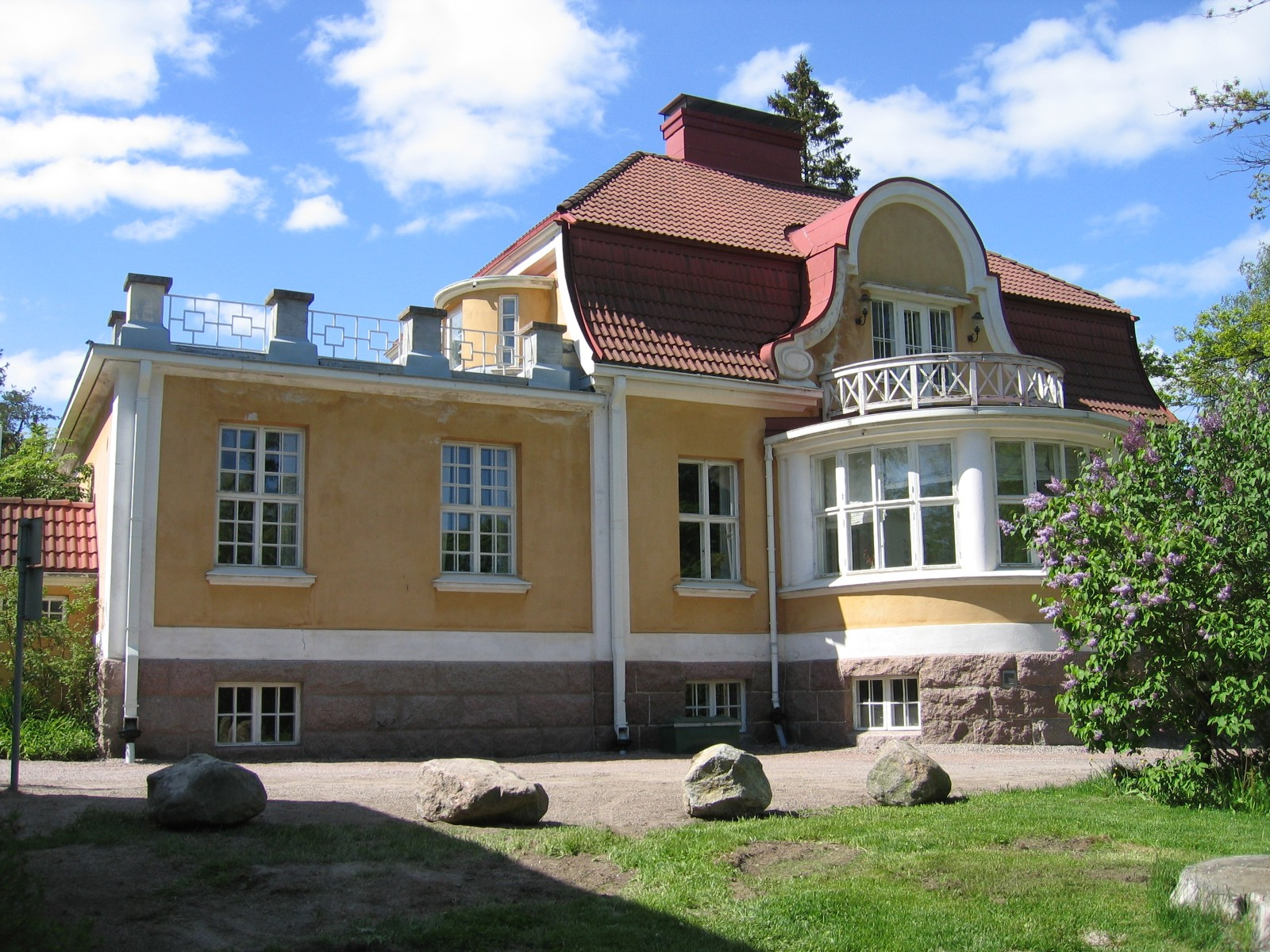
- Villa Junghans in Kauniainen

- Coat of arms

- Location of Kauniainen in Finland
- Interactive map of Kauniainen
- Coordinates: 60°12′32″N 024°43′44″E
- Country: Finland
- Region: Uusimaa
- Sub-region: Helsinki sub-region
- Metropolitan area: Helsinki metropolitan area
- Charter: 1920
- City rights: 1972

Government
  - Town manager: Christoffer Masar

Area (2018-01-01)
  - Total: 6.00 km^{2} (2.32 sq mi)
  - Land: 5.89 km^{2} (2.27 sq mi)
  - Water: 0.12 km^{2} (0.046 sq mi)
  - Rank: 313th largest in Finland

Population (2025-12-31)
  - Total: 10,318
  - Rank: 95th largest in Finland
  - Density: 1,751.78/km^{2} (4,537.1/sq mi)

Population by native language
  - Finnish: 58.7% (official)
  - Swedish: 30.2% (official)
  - Others: 11.1%

Population by age
  - 0 to 14: 17.9%
  - 15 to 64: 60.4%
  - 65 or older: 21.7%
- Time zone: UTC+02:00 (EET)
  - Summer (DST): UTC+03:00 (EEST)
- Climate: Dfb
- Website: www.kauniainen.fi

Kauniainen (Finnish: [ˈkɑu̯niˌɑi̯nen]; Swedish: Grankulla) is a town in Finland, located in the southern interior of the country. Kauniainen is situated in the southern part of the Uusimaa region, and it is enclaved by the City of Espoo. The population of Kauniainen is approximately 10,000. It is the 95th most populous municipality in Finland. Kauniainen is part of the Helsinki Metropolitan Area, which has approximately 1.62 million inhabitants.

Kauniainen was founded by a corporation in 1906, AB Grankulla, that parcelled land and created a suburb for villas; Kauniainen received the status of a market town in 1920, the Finnish name in 1949 and the title of kaupunki ("city, town") in 1972.

The municipal taxation rate in Kauniainen is the lowest in Finland (%), which has made the city attractive to high-income families. This in turn makes the average income generally high, making it possible to keep the taxation rate low without compromising the service to the inhabitants.

Kauniainen is a bilingual municipality with Finnish and Swedish as its official languages. The population consists of 59% Finnish speakers, 30% Swedish speakers, and 11% speakers of other languages. The dominant party in the city council has traditionally been the Swedish People's Party.

== Etymology ==
The Swedish name Grankulla is composed by the Swedish words "gran" (spruce) and "kulle" (hill) and has been in use in this form since the beginning of the 1900s. Earlier the place was known under its dialectal form Gränkull. The name Gränkull is found on modern maps as the name of the hill where the water tower in Kauniainen is located. The Finnish name of the town, Kauniainen, is derived from the name of a homestead that was located in Kauniainen called Kauniais. It was named after an estate near Tampere. The Finnish name was taken into use in the 1930s and was made the official name of the town alongside the Swedish name in 1949.

== Heraldry ==
The explanation for the coat of arms is "a golden, red squirrel sitting on a blue plate, holding a black spruce cone in its forefeet, with three golden roses side by side above it." The squirrel holding the spruce cone of the coat of arms indirectly refers to the Swedish name of Kauniainen (Grankulla). The roses on the subject depict the villa settlements in the locality. The coat of arms was designed by Ahto Numminen and approved by the Kauniainen Chamber of Commerce at its meetings on June 5, 1951, and January 10, 1952. The Ministry of the Interior confirmed the use of the coat of arms on March 11 of the same year.

== History ==
Around 10,000 years ago, after the Ice Age, only a few islets were visible in the Yoldia Sea, heights that today form the highest peaks of the area that is today known as Kauniainen. As the land slowly rose Kauniainen became a part of the inner archipelago around 4,000 years ago and there is evidence of human activity in the area in form of pieces of ceramics from this time period. However, the first permanent settlements in the area were established in the 19th century. Today Kauniainen is situated several kilometres from the sea.

In the beginning of the 20th century Kauniainen only consisted of a few crofters' holdings at the outskirts of larger farms in Espoo. The name of the place, Grankulla, was known as the more dialectal Gränkull. The main road between Helsinki and Turku had passed through the northern parts of Kauniainen for centuries, but the new railway between the same cities that opened in 1903 was crucial for the development of the area.

The history of modern Kauniainen began in 1906 when a company, AB Grankulla, bought the land and sold it to people who wanted to have a villa outside the unhealthy city life in Helsinki. Several other similar communities were established at the same time around Helsinki: Kulosaari, Haaga, Leppävaara and Puistola. The share holders, among them the "father" of the municipality Janne Thurman, could be satisfied with their investment; they got the invested money back in one year. The era of the villas had, however, begun a few years earlier, when Elia Heikel and Emil Lindstedt bought the area around lake Gallträsk and built the first villas. No properties sold were smaller than 3,000 square metres.

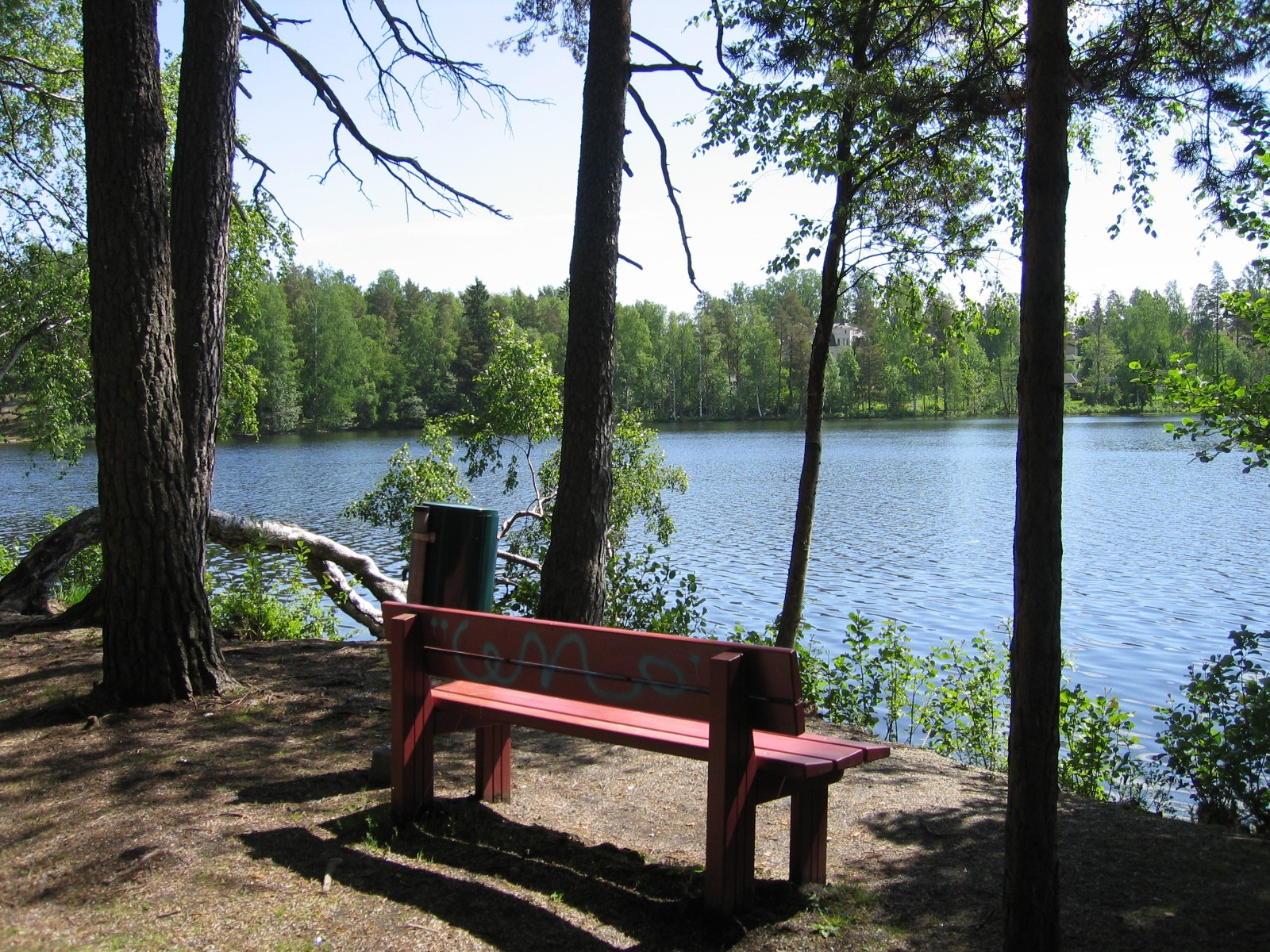
Lake Gallträsk

Because the municipality of Espoo, to which the area of Kauniainen belonged, did not show much interest in the new community, the company was responsible for developing it; roads were built, a school founded, electricity arranged and the company lobbied for a railway station (opened in 1908) and a police office. In 1915 Kauniainen received a limited autonomy from Espoo and the role of the company declined.

The first exact population figure is from 1917 when the community had 1,647 inhabitants. In 1920 Kauniainen became a market town and gained complete municipal sovereignty. Kauniainen also differed from its rural surroundings in Espoo with a town plan, road network, villas and electricity. It was decided to keep Kauniainen a green, idyllic, rural community and industrial buildings were banned. Most of the villas were built in neoclassical style or in the late 1920s functionalism. The work with a new town plan was started in the late 1920s, but the proposal was disputed; the inhabitants (and property owners) thought the roads were too wide. The architect also died in the middle of the process, which led to that a compromise could be reached as late as in 1937. The population grew only by 10% from 1917 to 1939, while the population right outside the market town's borders grew significantly.

Kauniainen has been officially bilingual since 1936 and the Finnish name Kauniainen was made official beside the Swedish name Grankulla in 1949 by the market town's council. Already in the 1930s the name Kauniainen was used by the railways and the post service. The era of the villas ended with the Second World War and was replaced by reconstruction and economically challenging times.

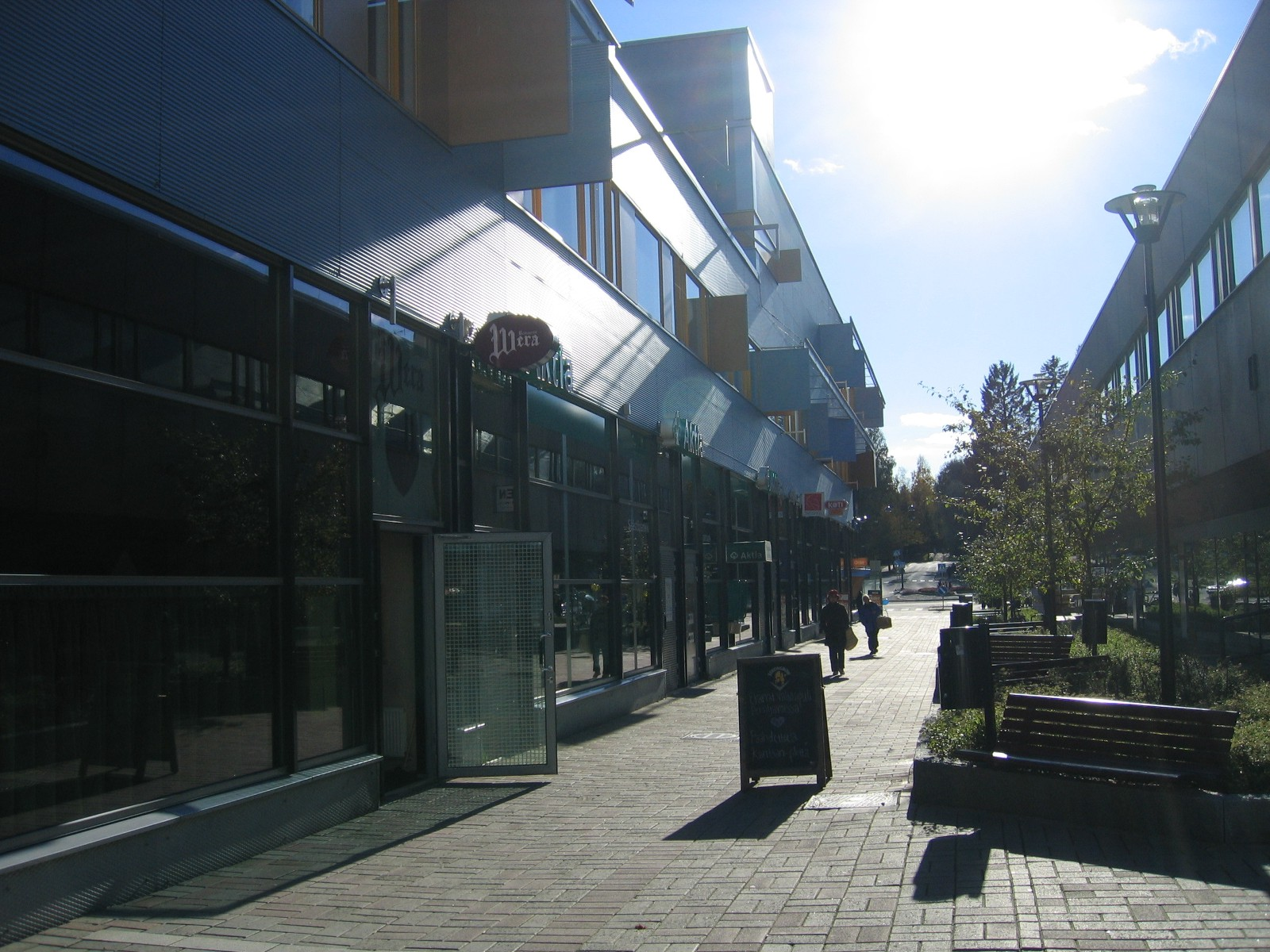
Kauniainen's commercial centre, where the old building from the 1960s to the right will be demolished

The independence of Kauniainen as a municipality was threatened by the municipal obligations and the small number of inhabitants. In the 1950s the market town tried to incorporate a few surrounding areas from Espoo, but the application was rejected in 1953. Instead the area of Kasavuori, which the market town had bought, was incorporated in 1957. Otto-Iivari Meurman was given the task of making a new town plan. He suggested that the villa milieu would be kept, but that the number of inhabitants would be significantly raised, from 2,500 to 10,000, and that the unmodern villas would be replaced by new ones. Also apartment buildings should be built. A new commercial centre was planned next to the railway station with Vällingby in Stockholm as a model. The plans for Kasavuori were approved in 1959 and for the rest of the market town in 1961 and 1963. The commercial centre was inaugurated in 1966. The town plan has later been criticised because the unique villa environment was disrupted and many of the beautiful villas were demolished. A skiing centre was planned in Kasavuori of the same type as Holmenkollen in Oslo, but the plans were never realised. Today this area is protected.

The number of inhabitants grew rapidly; in 1967 by as much as 25%. In 1972 Kauniainen gained the status of a city (fi. kaupunki) and the year after Finnish became the majority language of the inhabitants and Swedish the minority. The town had at the time 6,400 inhabitants. The commercial centre has been considered ugly and outdated for more than 20 years and a new development plan for the town centre was approved in May 2006. The project begun in December 2006 when the first building was demolished.

The population surpassed 10,000 inhabitants in 2020. At the end of 2020 there were 10,177 people living in the town.

== Transport ==
=== Roads ===
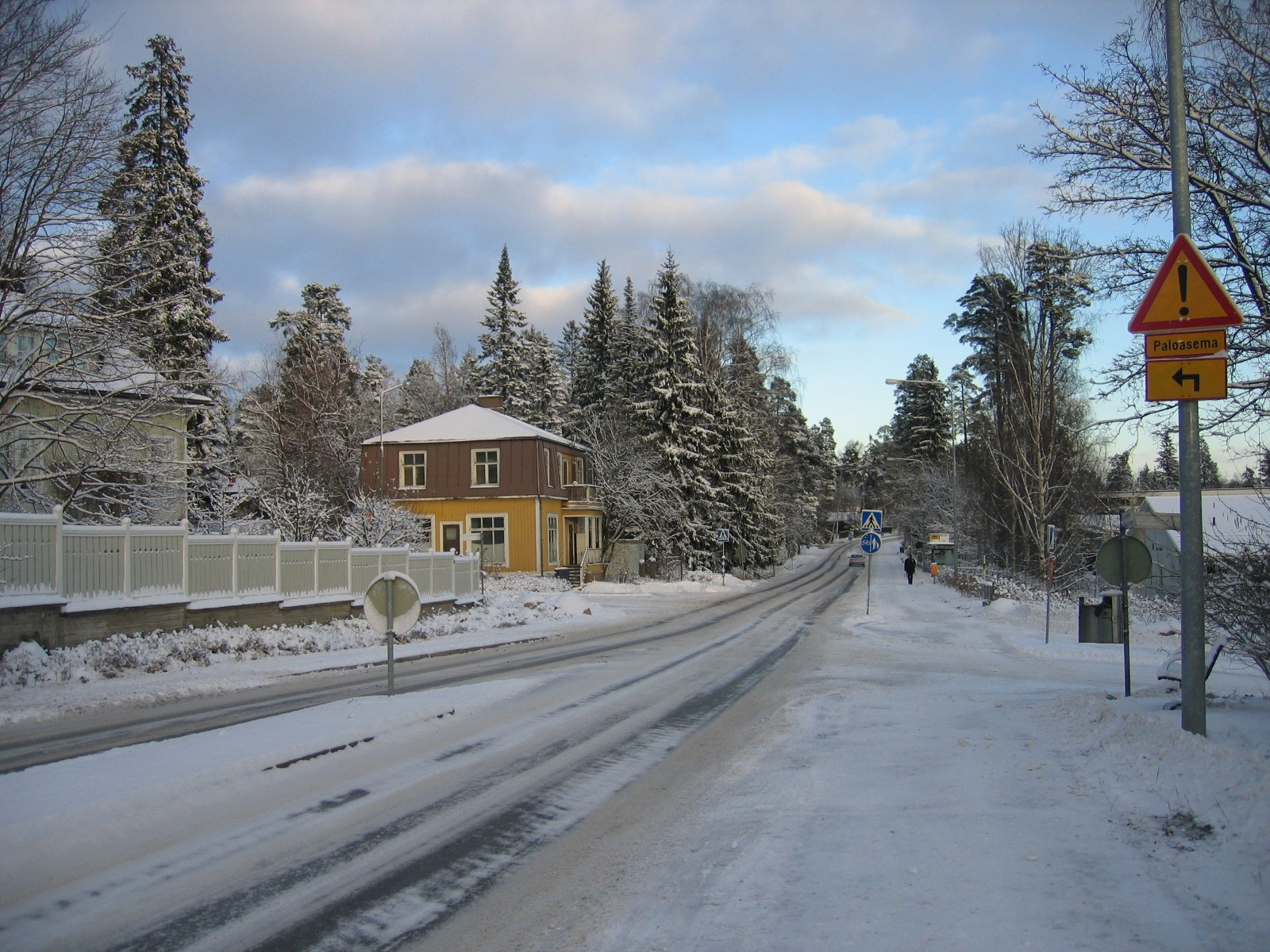
A road in Kauniainen during winter

Kauniainen has good road connections in most directions. The east-to-west Helsinki–Turku motorway (national road 1) passes Kauniainen to the south and the old Helsinki–Turku main road (regional road 110) passes the northern parts of the town. The construction of the motorway in the 1960s played a big role when new inhabitants moved to Kauniainen, when they could drive quickly along the motorway into Helsinki's city centre. The north-to-south Kehä II (Ring Road 2) passes the eastern corner of Kauniainen.

=== Public transportation ===
Kauniainen is served by two commuter rail stations, Kauniainen and Koivuhovi, on the Rantarata line, which was opened in 1903. The railway has been important for the development of Kauniainen as a suburb of Helsinki. Trains leave appromaximately every 15 minutes and the ride to Helsinki Central railway station takes about 20 minutes.

There are two regional bus lines which connect to Helsinki. There are also local bus lines which connect to various districts of Espoo.

== Services ==
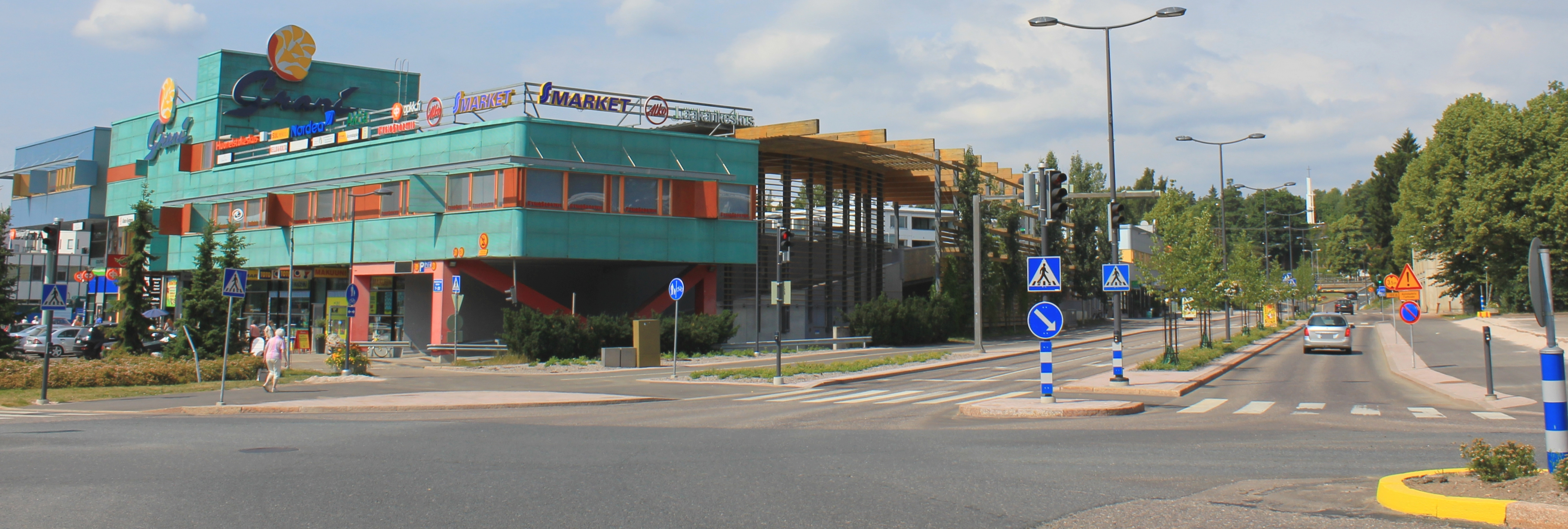
Grani Shopping Centre (Kauppakeskus Grani) in Kauniainen

Kauniainen offers a very large range of services to its inhabitants, considering the size of the town. There are six schools in Kauniainen, spread out on three levels and two languages – Finnish and Swedish. Kauniainen has:

- swimming pools
- indoor ice rink
- downhill skiing slope (only one slope, the oldest in Finland opened in 1934, elevation difference 54 meters)
- small athletics stadium
- indoor sports arena (handball, tennis, etc.)
- music school (for children)
- art school (for children)
- public library
- adult education school
- health station
- Kauniaisten Jäähalli (ice hockey arena)

== Districts ==
There are three districts in Kauniainen called I, II and III. No districts are named because of the small size of the town. The only area that is viewed as a named district is Kasavuori (Swedish: Kasaberget) in the western part of the town.

== Demographics ==
Historical population
Year	Pop.	±%
1950	2,484	—
1960	2,594	+4.4%
1970	6,192	+138.7%
1980	7,203	+16.3%
1990	7,889	+9.5%
2000	8,532	+8.2%
2010	8,689	+1.8%
2020	10,178	+17.1%
Source: Doria, Statistics Finland

== Politics ==
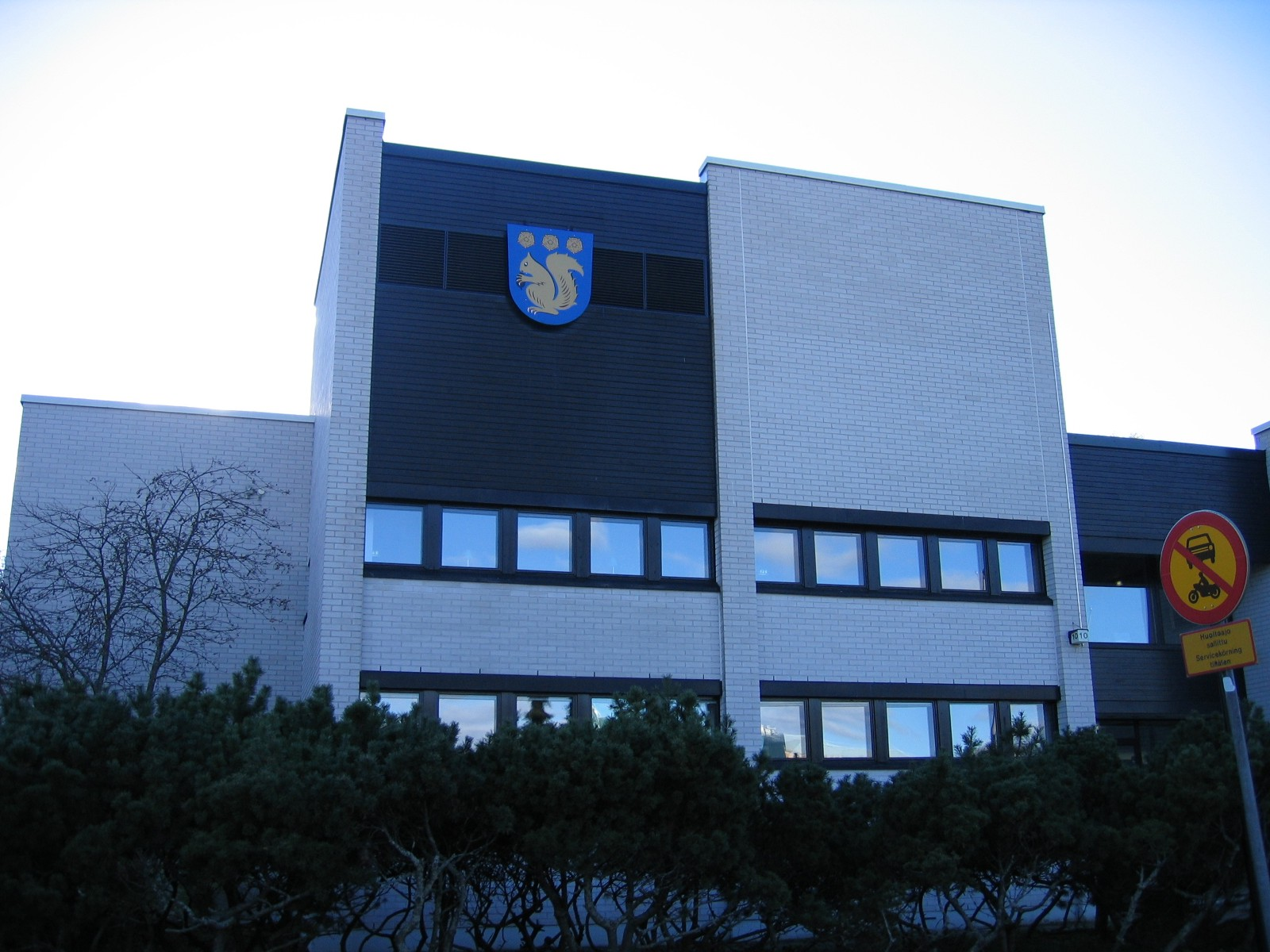
Kauniainen Town Hall

The following parties have seats in the city council of Kauniainen following the 2025 municipal election:

Party	Seats
Swedish People's Party	16
National Coalition Party	12
Green League	3
Social Democratic Party	2
Christian Democrats	1
Finns Party	1
Total	35

=== Parliamentary elections ===
Results of the 2011 Finnish parliamentary election in Kauniainen:

- National Coalition Party 39.5%
- Swedish People's Party 35.2%
- Green League 6.2%
- True Finns 5.9%
- Social Democratic Party 5.7%
- Centre Party 2.7%
- Christian Democrats 2.4%
- Left Alliance 1.4%

== Sports ==
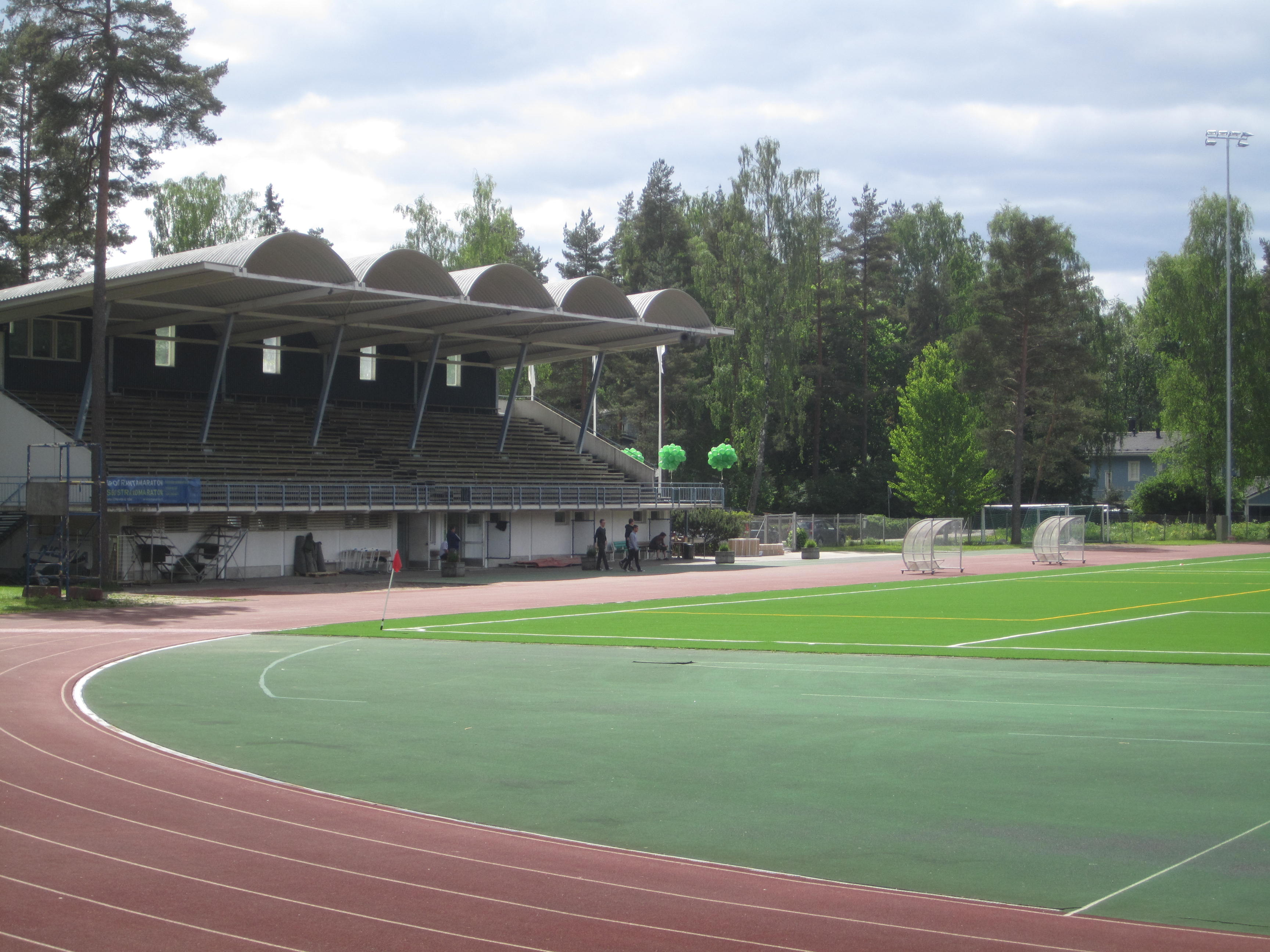
Kauniainen Stadium

Kauniainen has a large range of sports facilities and the town council has been active in sponsoring sports. There are activities in most sports with Grankulla IFK (GrIFK) as the biggest association. GrIFK was founded in 1925 and is today active in ice hockey, football, handball, floorball and alpine skiing.

== Notable people ==
- Isac Elliot, singer
- Marcus Grönholm, World Rally Championship racer
- Niclas Grönholm, racing driver and son of Marcus Grönholm
- Pia Julin, sports shooter
- Yrjö Kukkapuro, architect
- Petter Meyer, footballer
- Alexandra Olsson, handball player
- Jarmo Saari, guitarist, composer and record producer
- Toni Söderholm, ice hockey player
- Pasi Sormunen, ice hockey player
- Emelie Sederholm, singer-songwriter currently based in Stockholm
- Monty Widenius, creator of MySQL and MariaDB

== See also ==
- Enonkoski, a municipality surrounded by Savonlinna in South Savo, Finland
