= Kai Wartiainen =

Finnish architect and former academic (born 1953)

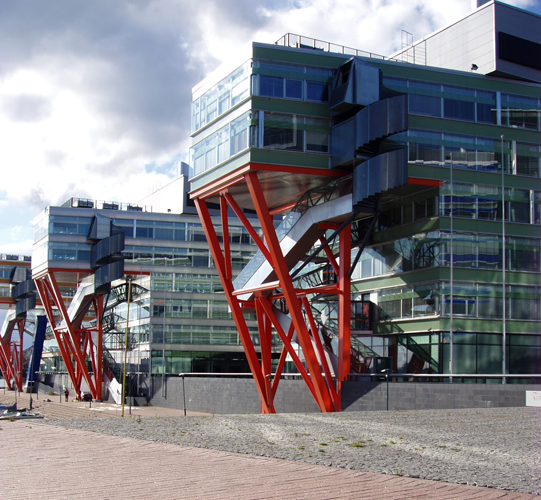
High Tech Centre, Helsinki, 2001

Kai Henrik Väinö Wartiainen (born 1953 in Kouvola) is a Finnish architect and former academic. He is the son of architect Henrik Wartiainen. Wartiainen was professor of urban planning at the Royal Institute of Technology in Stockholm, Sweden in 1997–2006. Wartiainen was previously married to the Finnish architect Sari Nieminen, but is now married to the Swedish Architect Ingrid Reppen.

After working for his father, he first founded Kai Wartiainen Architects in Helsinki. Then, between 2004 and 2010 he became a partner and Creative Director in Evata – at the time the largest architectural firm in Finland. He became creative director of Pöyry Architects between 2008 and 2011. In 2000 he founded the Stockholm planning firm ajö´ tristess with architect Ingrid Reppen, though in 2011 it changed its name to arkitektur + development.

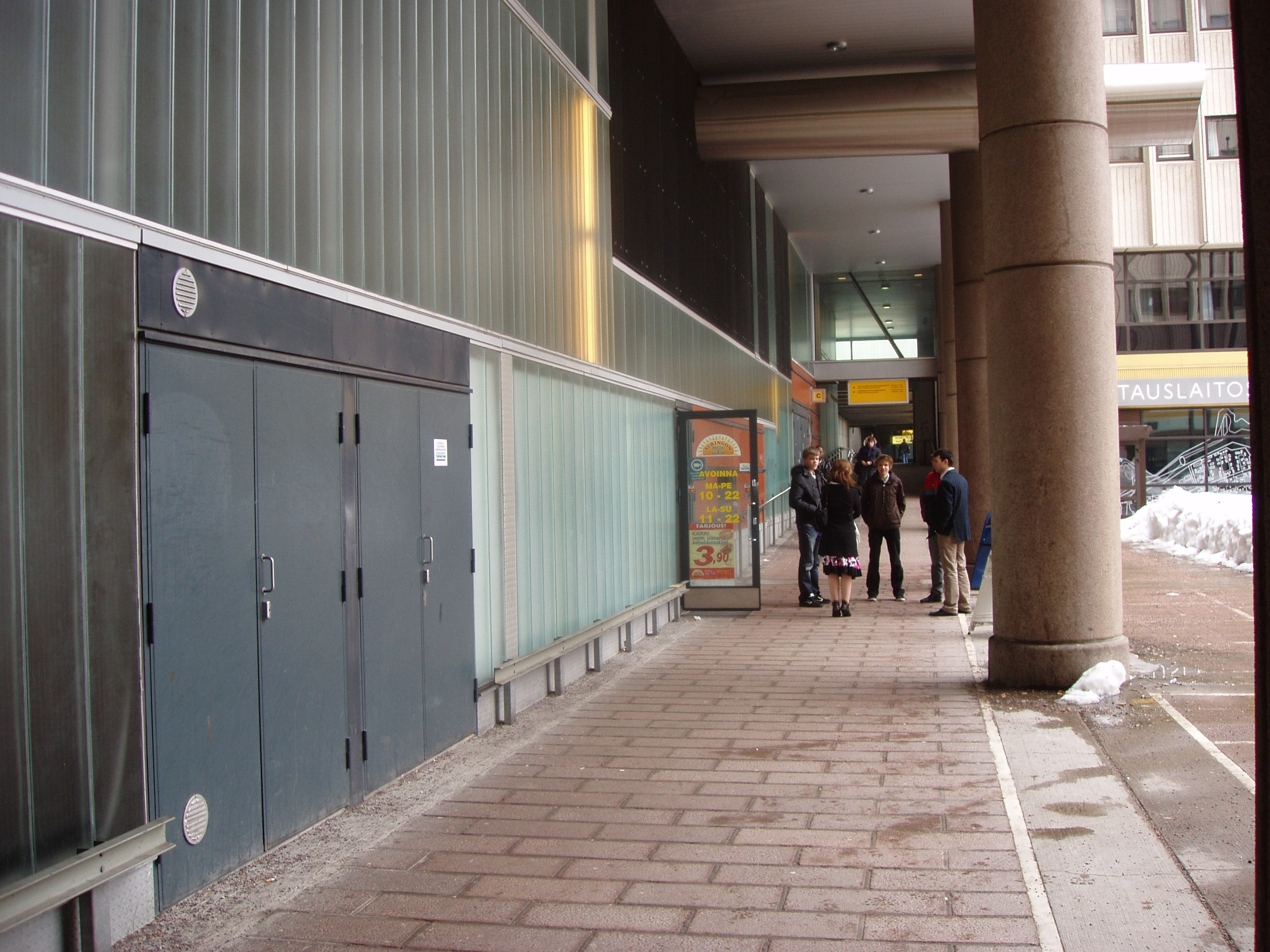
Itä-Pasila infill, Helsinki, 2000

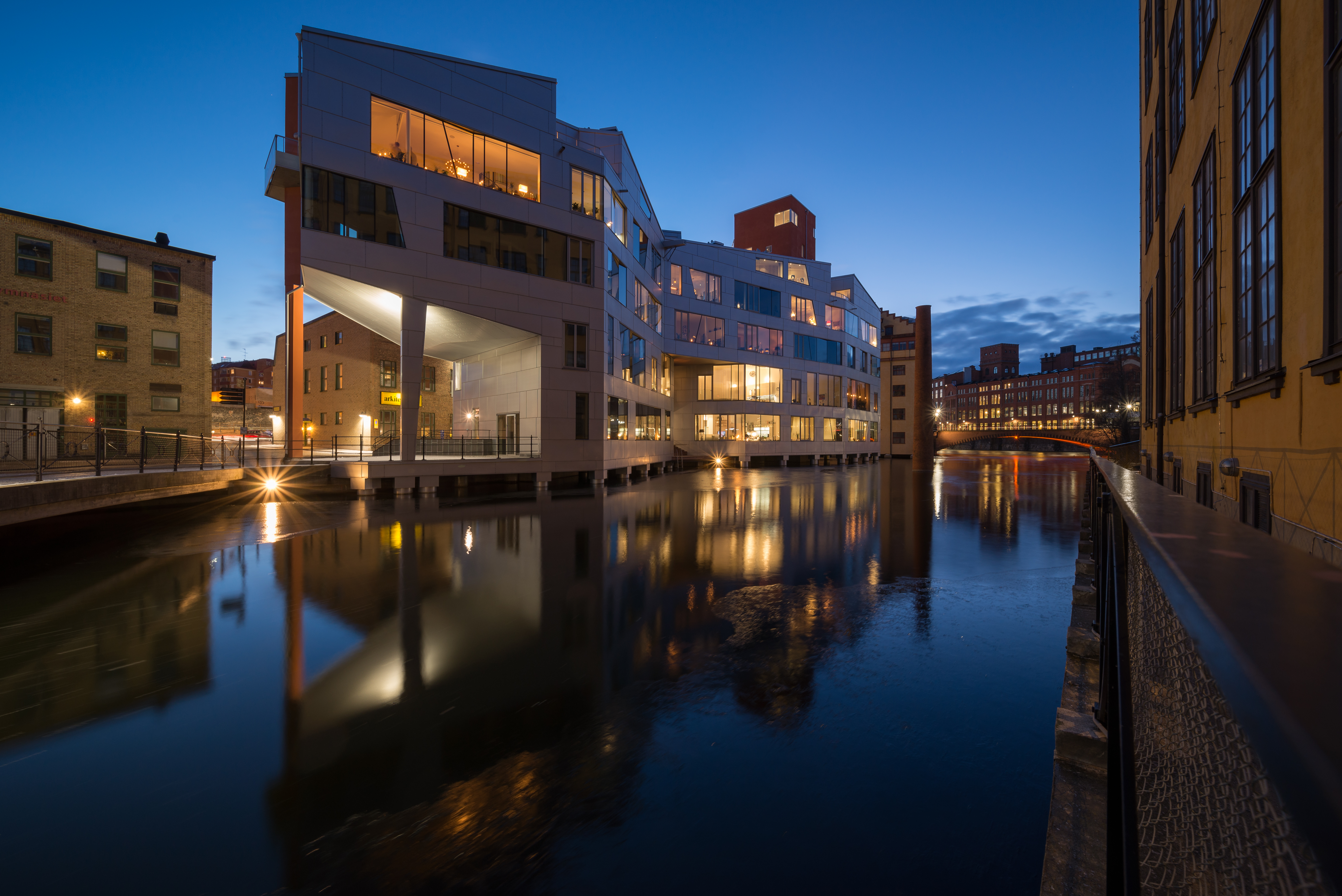
Residential building in Norrköping (together with Ingrid Reppen), 2015.

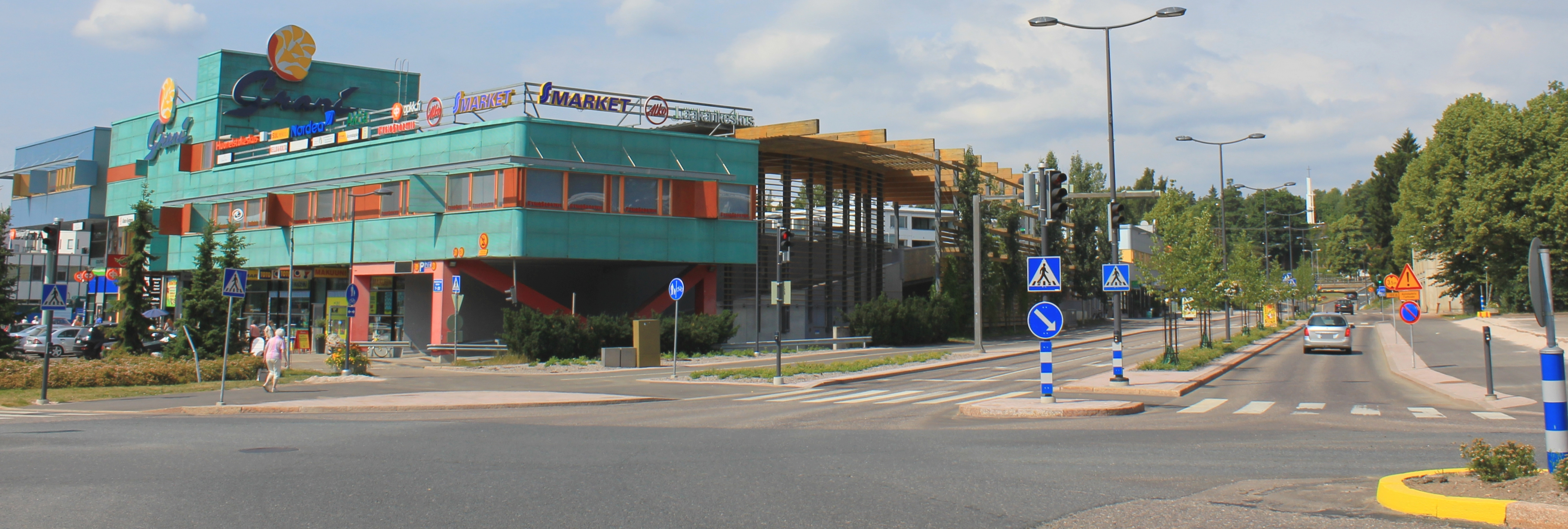
Grani Shopping Centre, Kauniainen, 2001

Among Wartiainen's realised building designs include the High Tech Center (HTC), Ruoholahti, Helsinki (2001), the Grani Shopping Centre, Kauniainen (2001), Karkkila town hall and library (1991) and Itä-Pasila urban insertions (2005). Wartiainen has won several international competitions, including France's first ecological house in Paris, at Parc de la Villette (2000), and the Nordic First Waterfront Project for the Holmen industrial landscape of Norrköping, Sweden. In 1997 Wartiainen was selected to lead the research in defining the ecological criteria for Finland's first eco-village, Eko-Viikki. Together with a work group, he drew up the so-called PIMWAG criteria (the name was derived from the initials of the members), i.e. 5 factors to be taken into account in assessing the level of ecology of a scheme: pollution, the availability of natural resources, health, the biodiversity of nature, and nutrition.

In addition to ecological issues, Wartiainen has also been a controversial champion of libertarianism and the so-called "innovation culture" typified by the internet, and criticises the inflexibility of the state-driven norms of urban planning practice. He plots a historical line of development from the "full control" of autocrats to the "instrumental control" of what he terms expert dictatorship to the ultimate goal of the "out of control" of co-creation, and whereby professional urban design and planning expertise is ultimately replaced by urban management.

In December 2016 Wartiainen was awarded the Swedish Architects' Prize.
