= Tolsa railway station =

Railway station in Kirkkonummi, Finland

Tolsa Tolls
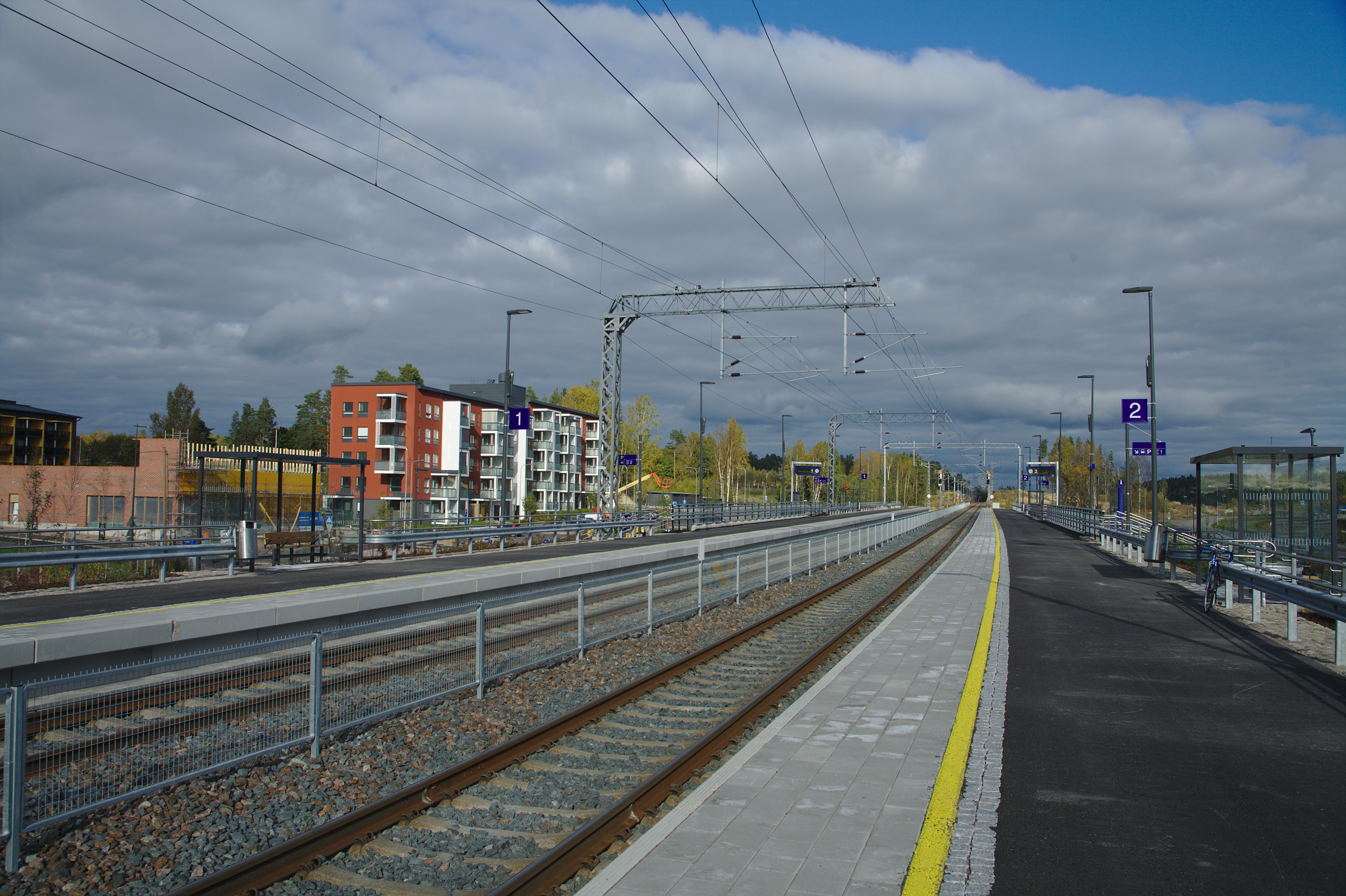

General information
- Location: Tolsanmäki, 02400; Tolsa, Kirkkonummi; Finland
- Coordinates: 60°07′04″N 024°28′14″E
- System: Helsinki commuter rail station
- Owner: Finnish Transport Infrastructure Agency
- Line: Helsinki–Turku
- Platforms: 2 side platforms
- Train operators: VR on behalf of HSL
- Connections: Helsinki buses

Other information
- Station code: Tol
- Fare zone: D
- Classification: Halt

Passengers
- 2019: 220,446

Services
Preceding station	Helsinki commuter rail	Following station
Jorvas towards Helsinki	U	Kirkkonummi Terminus
Jorvas towards Helsinki	L	Kirkkonummi Terminus
Location

Tolsa railway station (Finnish: Tolsan rautatieasema, Swedish: Tolls hållplats) is a railway halt on the Helsinki commuter rail network located in the town of Kirkkonummi, Finland, between the Jorvas and Kirkkonummi stations. The station is served by Helsinki commuter rail lines U and L.

== History ==
=== First halt ===
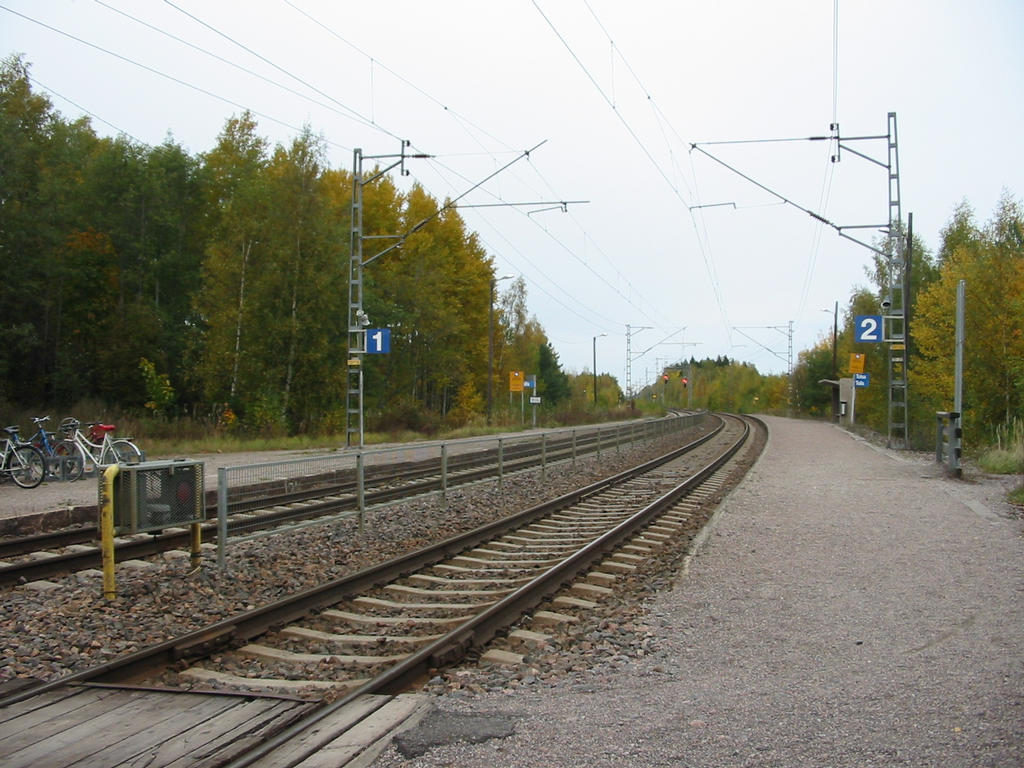
Tolsa in October 2003

Tolls was opened as a halt on 1 December 1905 as a pysäkki (a station of lower significance, translating to stop, as prompted by recreational residences being built in the area after the opening of the railway. In the same year, a type väntskjul small station building was constructed; it was replaced by a new design by Thure Hellström in 1928. The station had its Finnish name, Tolsa, officialized in the same year on 24 May.

The station was on the area of the territory of the Soviet Porkkala Naval Base, established as a result of the Moscow Armistice in 1944. Upon the return of Porkkala to Finnish control in 1956, Tolsa was re-established as an unstaffed halt on 15 August.

=== Second halt ===
The Tolsa station had been planned to be moved from its initial location slightly towards Helsinki for a long time. The reasons were the upgraded section of the highway 51 from Kivenlahti to the Munkinmäki interchange in Kirkkonummi, improved safety at the station, and a better population base at the new location. A 2009 study by the Finnish Rail Administration and the municipality of Kirkkonummi explored various options for entirely rebuilding the station with 55-centimetre (22 in) high and 220-metre (720 ft) long platforms, as well as removing the cross-platform level crossing in favor of an underpass.

In August 2013, the renovation of municipal infrastructure was started next to the track, along Tolsantie. The original plan was to move the station entirely to the Laajakallio side, but it was eventually decided to move the station to the east only slightly, to the bridge over Tolsantie. Work on the relocation of the station started in May 2014; on 15 November 2014, part of Tolsantie was closed from 19:00 onwards, when the old railway bridge over Tolsantie was demolished to make way for the new one. The new bridge, weighing 1,000 tonnes, was moved into place on 16 November 2014, and a new section of the railway was built over the bridge. The bridge relocation and track work was completed on the morning of 17 November 2014. The new station was opened on 15 August 2015. The project cost approximately €4 million, 76% of which was paid by the Finnish Transport Agency and the rest by the municipality.

== Services ==
Tolsa is served by U and L trains to Kirkkonummi on the Helsinki commuter rail network. The station has a HSL ticket vending machine, and although it lacks an elevator, it has 55 centimetres (22 in) high platforms and ramp routes for accessibility.

HSL bus connections are provided with stops on the Tolsantie street that the railway passes over, as well as the ramps on the nearby interchange between national road 51 (Jorvaksentie) and Porkkalantie. Park and ride services are provided with two parking lots on the south side of the station and one on the north side. The Tolsa station and its surrounding bus stops belong to HSL fare zone D.

== Departure tracks ==
Jorvas railway station has two platform tracks.

- Track 1 is used by commuter trains U and L to Kirkkonummi.
- Track 2 is used by commuter trains U and L to Helsinki. This track is also used by some individual trains to Kirkkonummi, if they are meant to arrive on tracks 2 or 3 at Kirkkonummi station.
