= Masala railway station =

Railway station in Finland

Masala Masaby
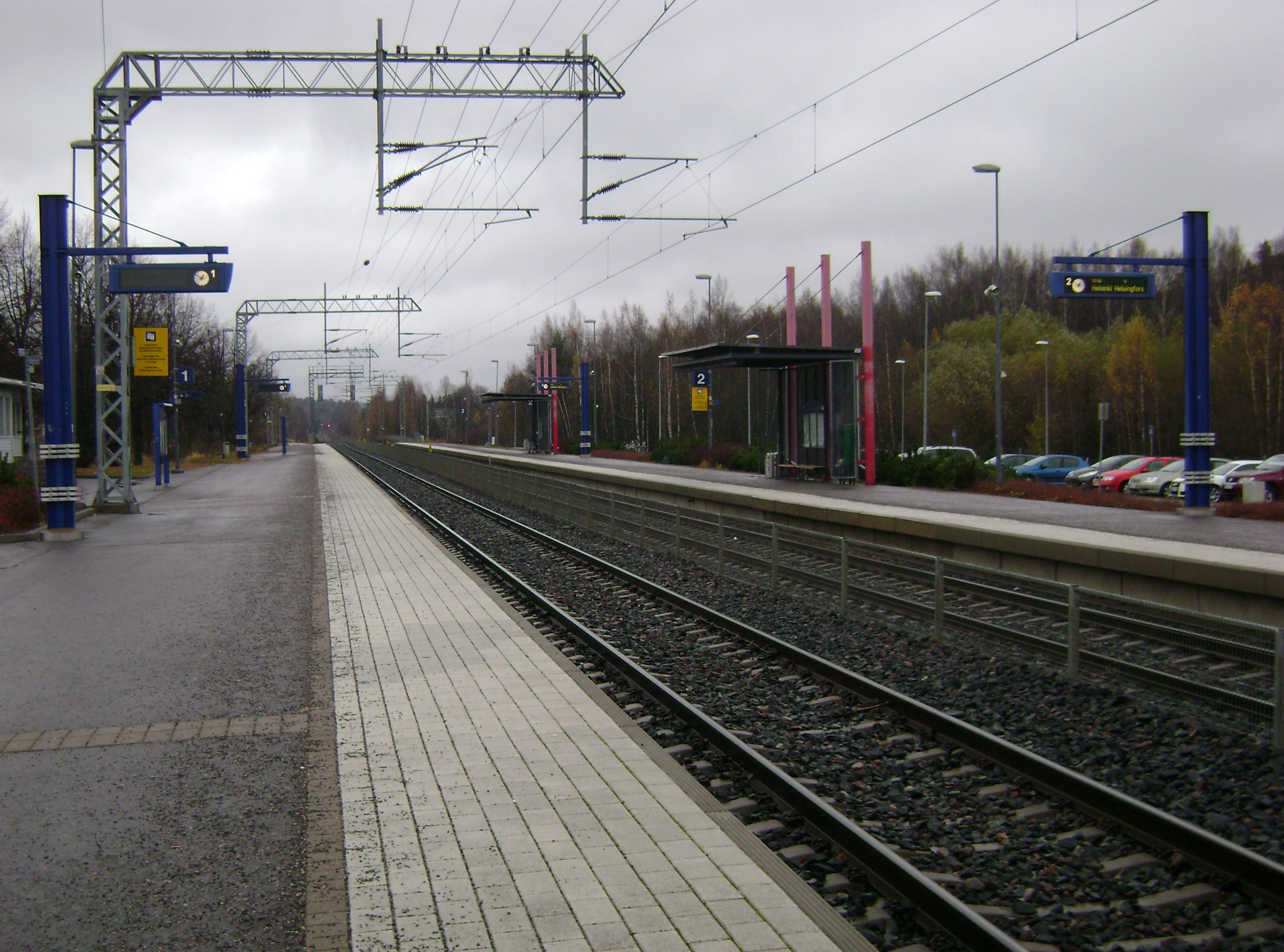

General information
- Location: Junailijankuja 02430; Masala, Kirkkonummi; Finland
- Coordinates: 60°09′23″N 024°32′13″E
- System: Helsinki commuter rail station
- Owner: Finnish Transport Infrastructure Agency
- Line: Helsinki–Turku railway
- Platforms: 2

Construction
- Structure type: ground station

Other information
- Station code: Mas
- Fare zone: D

Passengers
- 2019: 535,437

Services
Preceding station	Helsinki commuter rail	Following station
Kauklahti towards Helsinki	Y	Kirkkonummi towards Siuntio
Kauklahti towards Helsinki	U	Jorvas towards Kirkkonummi
Kauklahti towards Helsinki	L	Jorvas towards Kirkkonummi
Location

Masala railway station (Finnish: Masalan rautatieasema, Swedish: Masaby järnvägsstation) is a station on the Helsinki commuter rail network located in the Masala district of Kirkkonummi, Finland, between the Kauklahti and Jorvas stations. The station is served by Helsinki commuter rail lines Y, U and L.

The Masala station has high platforms and platform displays. There is an announcement system at the station. The station has 140 free-of-charge bicycle parking places and 80 free-of-charge car parking places. There is a taxi station and bus stop near the station.

== History ==
Masala railway station is one of the original railway stations opened on the Rantarata railway line in 1903. The original station building designed by Bruno Granholm was stylewise unlike the typical station buildings of the stations by the Rantarata line. In addition to Masala, station buildings of the similar style were only built at Kela, Täkter (Finnish: Tähtelä) and Solberg (Finnish: Päivölä) stations on the same railway line.

Masala station remained at the Porkkala Naval Base leased to the Soviet Union in 1944–1956. During this time, the first station building was destroyed, likely in a fire. After this, Soviets moved a residential house from Luoma to be the new station building.

When Porkkala was returned to Finland in 1956, the station was re-opened for Finnish trains and a month later the station was staffed. The station building is said to have been in such a bad condition that it had to be demolished after which the station functioned in a warehouse. The third station building, designed by architect Jarl Ungern, was introduced in 1963. This station was destroyed in a fire on January 14th, 2011.

After Porkkala was returned to Finland, some industry was founded near the Masala station and in the 1970's there was also a repair hall for electric locomotives at the station. An underpass tunnel was built at the station in 1966. Freight traffic ceased in 1990 and the ticket sales office was closed in 1997, after which the station became unstaffed. The train platforms were moved westwards and a new underpass tunnels were built in 2005.

== Connections ==
- Y trains (Helsinki–Siuntio–Helsinki)
- U trains (Helsinki–Kirkkonummi–Helsinki)
- L trains (Helsinki–Kirkkonummi–Helsinki, nighttime)

== Departure tracks ==
Masala railway station has two platform tracks.

- Track 1 is used by commuter trains Y to Siuntio as well as U and L to Kirkkonummi.
- Track 2 is used by commuter trains Y, U, and L to Helsinki.
