= Pelto railway station =

Railway station in Finland

Pelto Åker

General information
- Coordinates: 60°11′58″N 24°37′34″E
- System: Request stop
- Owner: State Railways
- Lines: L, Y
- Platforms: 2
- Tracks: 2

Other information
- Station code: Plt
- Fare zone: VR zone B

History
- Opened: 2 January 1931
- Closed: 28 May 1995
- Electrified: 1938
Location

Pelto request stop (Finnish: Pellon seisake, Swedish: Åkers hållplats) was a railway request stop in Espoo, Finland, located midway between Espoo railway station & Kauklahti railway station, approximately 1.8 km from each.

The stop opened on 2 January 1931. It was originally scheduled for closure in 1978, but due to the presence of a nearby small hospital and the requests of a few local residents, it remained in operation. Pelto request stop was seldom used, as it was situated in a field with very few nearby houses.

On 28 May 1995 Pelto request stop was abolished due to extremely low number of users (estimated 5-20 per day.) There is currently nothing remaining of the request stop, even the crossing was abolished in 2006. The L train was the only train that stopped at Pelto and only if a passenger requested it to do so.
