= Luoma (surname) =

Luoma is a Finnish surname. Notable people with the surname include:

- Mikko Luoma (born 1976), Finnish professional ice hockey defenceman
- Rauni Luoma (1911–1996), Finnish film actress
- Tapio Luoma (born 1962), Archbishop of Turku

== See also ==
- Tricia Dunn-Luoma (born 1975), American ice hockey player
