= Grani (shopping centre) =

Grani Shopping Center
- Kauppakeskus Grani
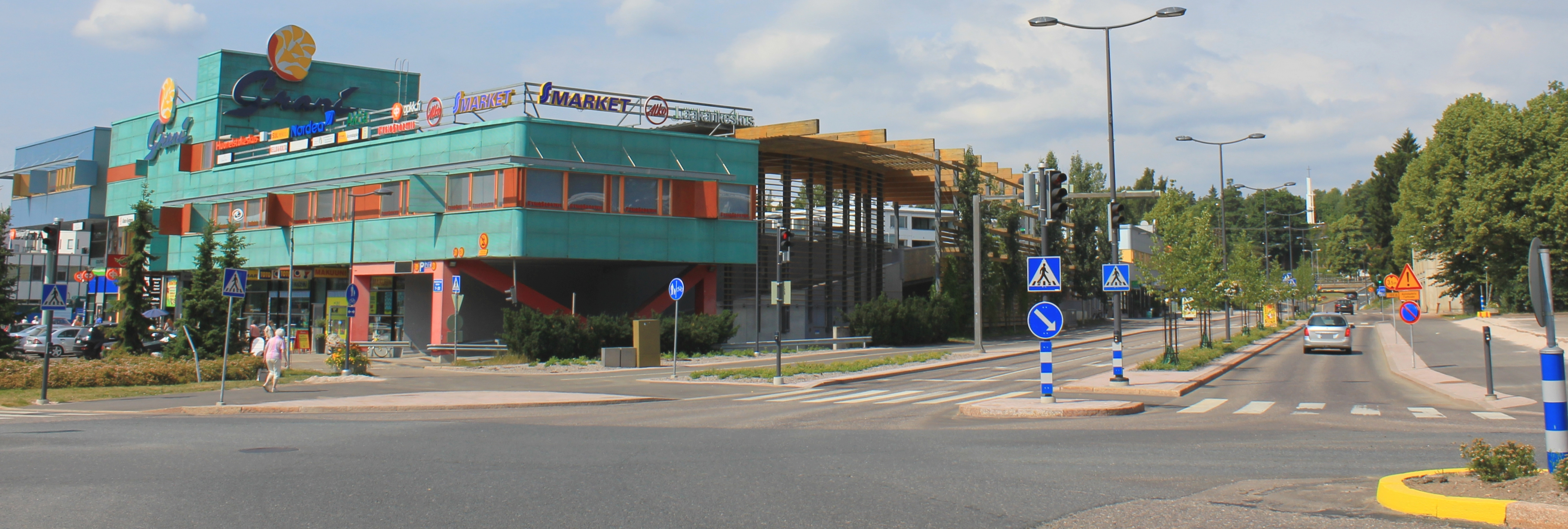
- Grani Shopping Centre in the town center
- Location: Kauniainen, Finland
- Coordinates: 60°12′36.42293″N 24°43′44.33052″E
- Address: Kauniaistentie 7
- Opened: 2001
- Owner: VVT Kiinteistösijoitus Oy
- Website: www.kauppakeskusgrani.fi

Grani is a shopping center located in the town center of Kauniainen in Uusimaa, Finland. It has expanded in three phases, the first being commissioned in 2001 and the third in 2018. Grani was originally owned by NCC, until in 2003 the Finnish company Oy Querenchia Ltd became the new owner and in 2006 the German company Aareal. Of the three parts, two newer are owned by VVT Kiinteistösijoitus Oy. Grani's stores include the grocery stores S-market and K-Supermarket.

The shopping center was previously occupied by the office buildings of HOK-Elanto and Helsingin Osuuspankki, which were demolished in 1993 and 2006. Grani's architecture has been criticized, and Kai Wartiainen, the chief designer, does not consider it completely successful. The biggest problem, however, he sees around the building, where too much space is reserved for cars and road areas without reaching a comfortable small scale.
