= National Land Survey of Finland =

- Maanmittauslaitos; Lantmäteriverket

Agency overview
- Formed: 1812
- Jurisdiction: Government of Finland
- Headquarters: Opastinsilta 12 C, Helsinki; 60°11′57″N 024°56′11″E
- Employees: 1,761
- Annual budget: €127 million (2010)
- Agency executive: Arvo Kokkonen, Director General
- Parent agency: Ministry of Agriculture and Forestry
- Website: www.maanmittauslaitos.fi/en

The National Land Survey of Finland (Finnish: Maanmittauslaitos, Swedish: Lantmäteriverket) is an official body, dealing with cartography and cadastre issues in Finland. It is subordinated the Finnish Ministry of Agriculture and Forestry.

On May 1, 2012 the National Land Survey opened its topographic datasets for free use.

== Organization ==
The current director is Arvo Kokkonen. The National Land Survey of Finland has offices in 37 localities across Finland, from Mariehamn to Ivalo. The number of employees totals approximately 2000. The organisation consists of a central administration and four operations units, which are Production, General Administration, Centre for ICT Services, and the Finnish Geospatial Research Institute (FGI).

The National Land Survey deals both with cartographic and cadastre questions, and upholds a national Geographic Information System. Furthermore, the NLS provides services concerning land, environment and buildings. The main customer is the private sector.

== Directors General ==
- Abraham Nordenstedt 1812–1820
- Abraham Joachim Molander 1821–1828
- Carl Gustaf Tawaststjerna 1828–1843
- Jonas Ferdinand Bergenheim 1843–1845
- Alexander Rechenberg 1847–1854
- Clas Wilhelm Gyldèn 1854–1872
- Berndt Otto Nymalm 1872–1887
- Jaakko Sjölin 1887–1915
- Otto Sarvi 1915–1917
- Kyösti Haataja 1917–1929
- Väinö Ahla 1929–1950
- Väinö V. Seppälä 1950–1960
- Viljo Niskanen 1960–1972
- Lauri Kantee 1972–1991
- Jarmo Ratia 1991–1999
- Pauli Karvinen 1999–2000
- Jarmo Ratia 2000–2012
- Arvo Kokkonen 2012–
