= Kauklahti railway station =

Railway station in Espoo, Finland

Kauklahti Köklax
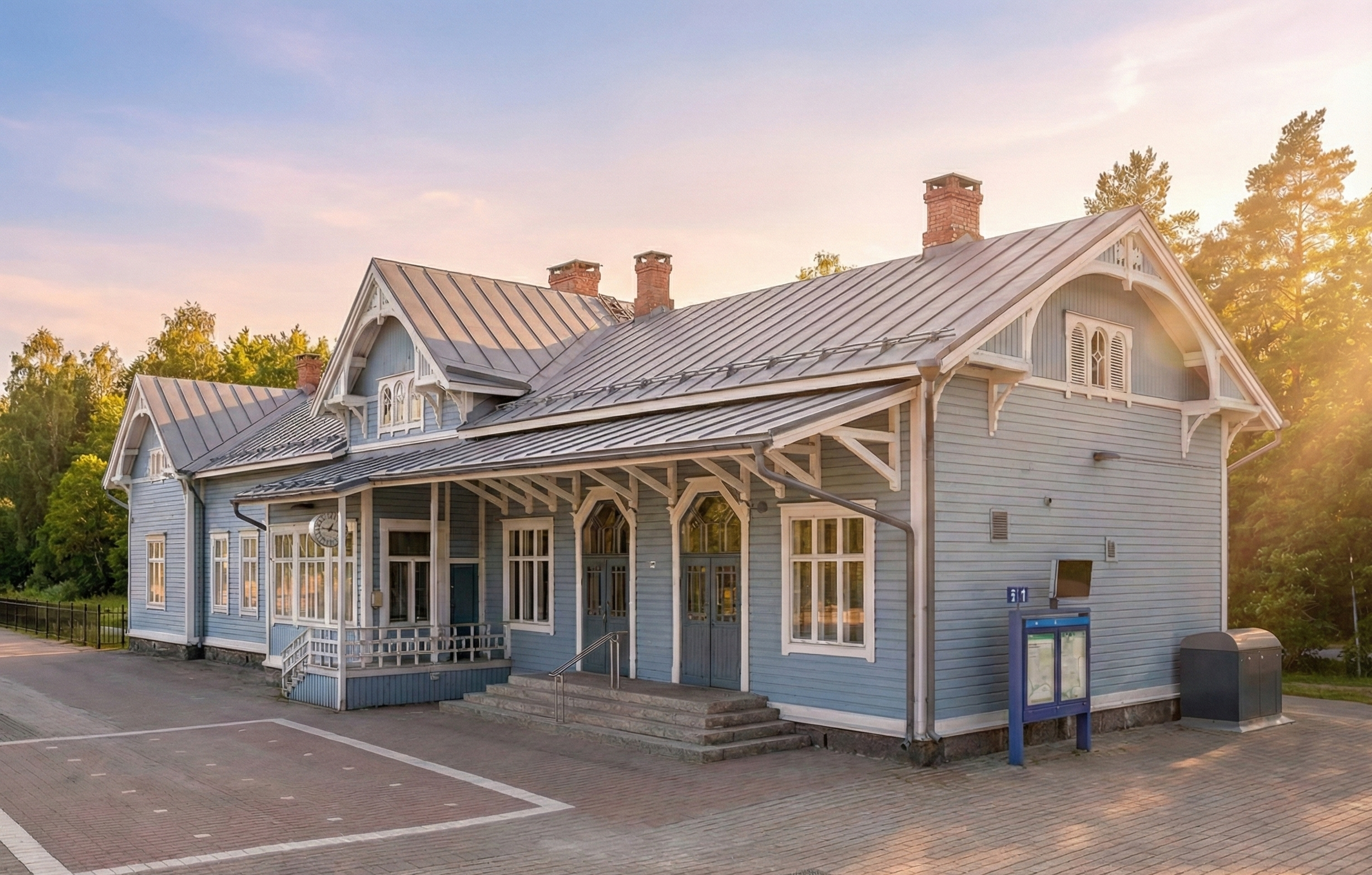

General information
- Coordinates: 60°11′13″N 024°35′41″E
- System: Helsinki commuter rail station
- Owner: Finnish Transport Agency
- Lines: Y, U, L, E
- Platforms: 2
- Connections: bus lines 118, 165, 165N (night bus), 166, 167, 168, 213, 213N (night bus), 911

Construction
- Structure type: ground station
- Architect: Bruno Granholm
- Architectural style: National Romanticism

Other information
- Fare zone: C

Passengers
- 2019: 1,332,562

Services
Preceding station	Helsinki commuter rail	Following station
Espoo towards Helsinki	Y	Masala towards Siuntio
Espoo towards Helsinki	U	Masala towards Kirkkonummi
Espoo towards Helsinki	L	Masala towards Kirkkonummi
Espoo towards Helsinki	E	Terminus
Location

Kauklahti railway station (Finnish: Kauklahden rautatieasema, Swedish: Köklax järnvägstation) is a station on the Helsinki commuter rail network located in Espoo, Finland. The station is served by Helsinki commuter rail lines Y, U, L and E.

There used to be a request stop called Pelto whistle stop on the eastbound line towards Espoo and Helsinki, but this stop was closed in 1995 due to lack of use. There also used to be a little halt, Mankki, on the westbound line towards Kirkkonummi. This halt was closed in 2016 due to low passenger amounts.

The Finnish Heritage Agency has classified Kauklahti railway station as a nationally significant built cultural environment.

== History ==
During the planning of the Rantarata railway line Kauklahti was regarded as the best location for a railway station by the residents of Espoo, since it was located near the Espoo Manor and the densely populated rural region near the manor. Kauklahti was also planned as a junction station from the start, since a private railway from Kauklahti to the Högfors factory in Karkkila was intended to be built in the early 1900's. This plan ended up being discarded.

Kauklahti ended up being one of the two stations opened in Espoo, alongside the Espoo station near the Espoo Cathedral. The National Romantic style station building designed by architect Bruno Granholm was completed in 1903, with the same plans as the Kirkkonummi station.

When the Porkkala Naval Base was leased to the Soviet Union in 1944–1956, Kauklahti function as the eastern border station (the western border station being located at the Täkter station in Ingå). When Finnish long-distance trains were allowed to pass through the naval base starting from 1947, the windows on the train carriages were covered and the Finnish locomotive was changed to a Soviet locomotive at the Kauklahti station. When Porkkala was returned to Finland in 1956, the significance of the Kauklahti station decreased.

The railyard was modified in 1993 with new platforms and an underpass tunnel. The ticket sales office was closed in 1997. The station building is still owned by VR, but is no longer in its original use. In 2007, the terminus of the Helsinki Commuter Rail E line was moved from Espoo station westwards to the Kauklahti station, increasing the commuter traffic at the station.

There used to be a request stop called Pelto whistle stop on the eastbound line towards Espoo and Helsinki, but this stop was closed in 1995 due to lack of use. There also used to be a little halt, Mankki, on the westbound line towards Kirkkonummi. This halt was closed in 2016 due to low passenger amounts.

== Connections ==
- Y trains (Helsinki–Siuntio–Helsinki)
- U trains (Helsinki–Kirkkonummi–Helsinki)
- L trains (Helsinki–Kirkkonummi–Helsinki, nighttime)
- E trains (Helsinki–Kauklahti–Helsinki)

== Departure tracks ==
Kauklahti railway station has three platform tracks.

- Track 1 is used by commuter trains Y to Siuntio as well as U and L to Kirkkonummi.
- Track 2 is used by commuter trains Y, U and L as well as by some of the E trains to Helsinki.
- Track 3 is used by few of the E trains to Helsinki.
