= Kirkkonummi railway station =

Railway station in Kirkkonummi, Finland

Kirkkonummi Kyrkslätt
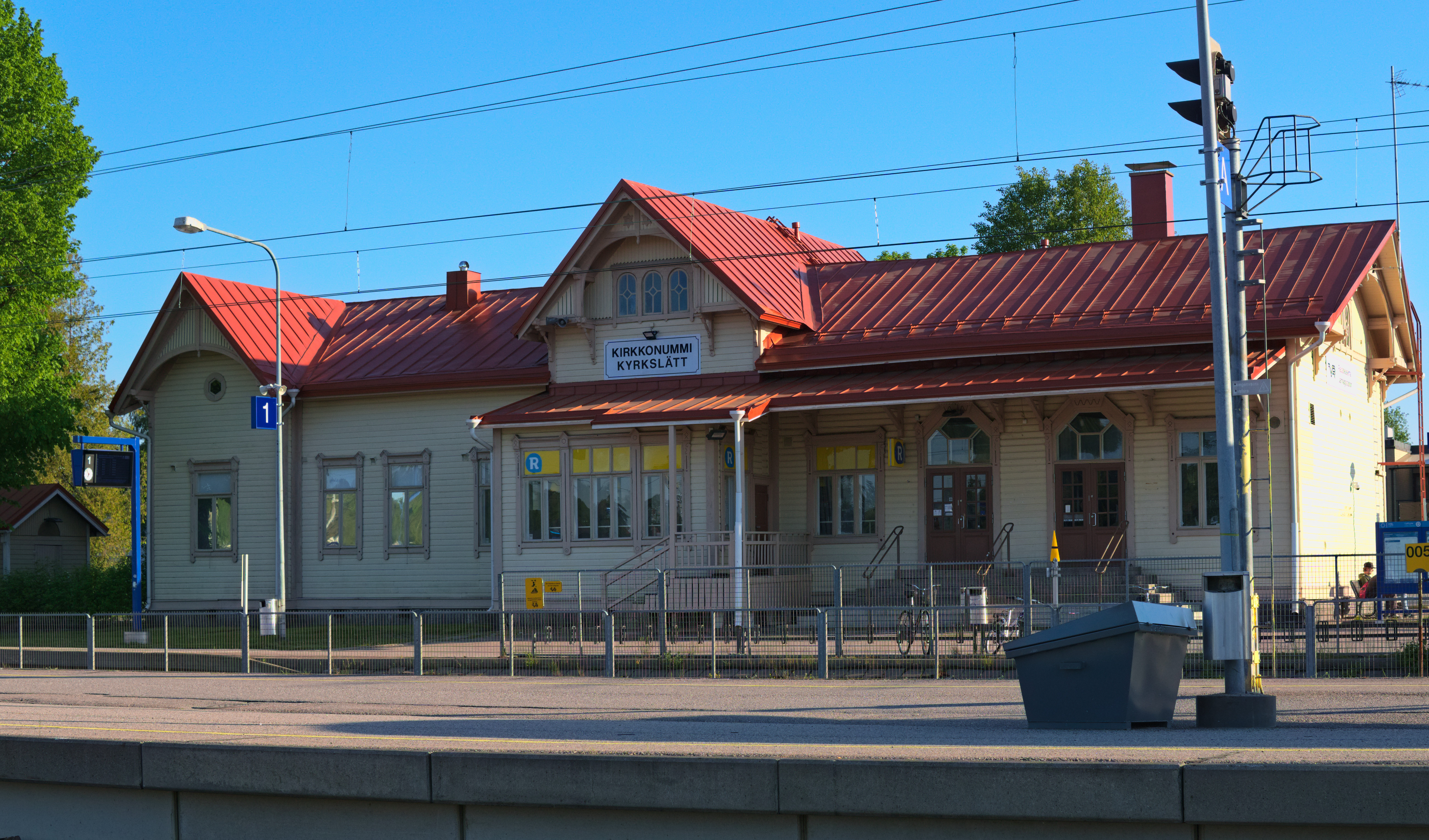

General information
- Location: Nummitie 13, 02400; Kirkkonummi; Finland
- Coordinates: 60°07′11″N 024°26′09″E
- System: VR station
- Owner: Finnish Transport Infrastructure Agency
- Line: Helsinki–Turku railway
- Platforms: 2
- Tracks: 5

Construction
- Structure type: ground station
- Parking: Yes
- Cycle facilities: Yes
- Accessible: 2

Other information
- Station code: Kkn
- Fare zone: D

History
- Opened: 1903; 123 years ago
- Electrified: 26 January 1969; 57 years ago

Passengers
- 2019: 1,088,778

Services
Preceding station	Helsinki commuter rail	Following station
Masala towards Helsinki	Y	Siuntio Terminus
Tolsa towards Helsinki	U	Terminus
Tolsa towards Helsinki	L	Terminus
Preceding station	VR commuter rail	Following station
Espoo towards Helsinki	H Limited service	Siuntio towards Hanko
Preceding station	VR Group	Following station
Leppävaara towards Helsinki	Helsinki–Turku	Karis towards Turku Harbour
Location
- Location within Uusimaa

Kirkkonummi railway station (Finnish: Kirkkonummen rautatieasema, Swedish: Kyrkslätts järnvägsstation) is a railway station in the municipality of Kirkkonummi, Finland, between Siuntio railway station and Tolsa railway station. It is located in the municipal town centre.

Kirkkonummi railway station serves as the terminus for the U and most L trains of the Helsinki commuter rail system and is also served by Y and L trains to Siuntio and thrice-weekly H trains to Hanko. Most of the long-distance trains between Helsinki and Turku used to stop at Kirkkonummi station until 2016. Nowadays only some few long-distance services make a stop at Kirkkonummi. The station has also three VR bus departures to Karis via Ingå on weekdays.

== History ==
Kirkkonummi railway station was one of the most significant intermediate stations on the Helsinki–Karis railway (Rantarata), opened in 1903. The station building designed by Bruno Granholm was completed in the same year, with a design similar to the one used for the station building at the Kauklahti station in Espoo.

The Kirkkonummi station remained in the Porkkala Naval Base leased to the Soviet Union in 1944. The station was re-opened for Finnish trains in May 1, 1956 shortly after Porkkala was returned to Finland.

An underpass tunnel was built at the station in 1988 and the station building was acquired by VR in 1995. Freight traffic at Kirkkonummi ceased in 2002, but the station is still a significant station for commuter trains.

== Connections ==
- Y trains (Helsinki–Siuntio)
- U trains (Helsinki–Kirkkonummi)
- L trains (Helsinki–Kirkkonummi (–Siuntio, one daily return), night-time and early morning)
- H trains (Helsinki-Hanko, thrice-weekly)
- A few of the long-distance services between Helsinki and Turku

== Departure tracks ==
There are three platform tracks at the Kirkkonummi railway station used by the passenger trains.

- Track 1 is used by westbound long-distance trains towards Turku, the H train to Hanko, Y and L trains to Siuntio and some of the U and L trains to Helsinki.
- Track 2 is used by eastbound long-distance trains, H and Y trains towards Helsinki.
- Track 3 is only used by U and L line trains to Helsinki.

== See also ==
- Railway lines in Finland
