= Degerby Church =

- Swedish: Degerby kyrka Finnish: Degerbyn kirkko
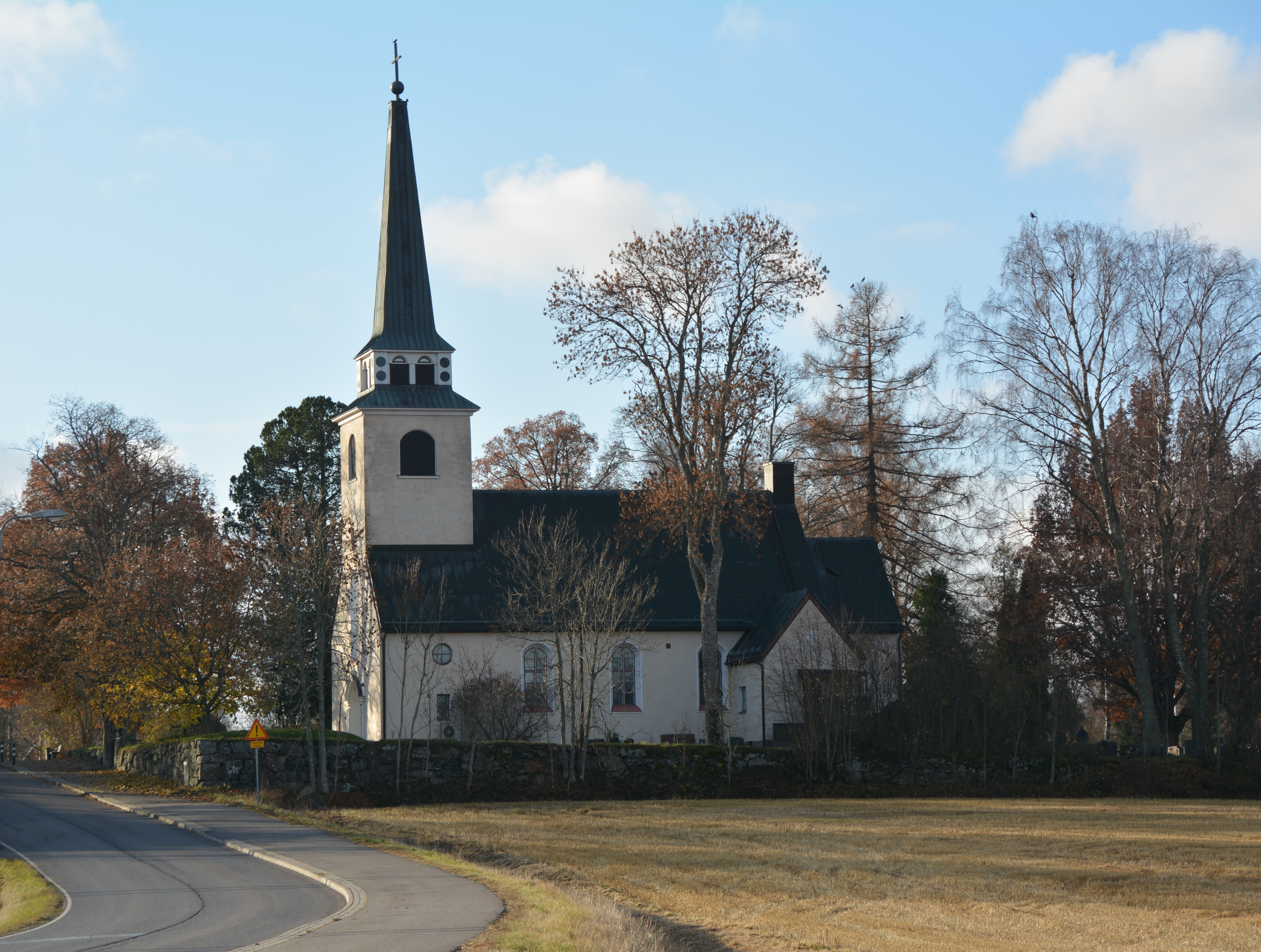
- Degerby Church
- 60°05′07.50″N 24°10′40.10″E
- Location: Degerby, Ingå, Uusimaa
- Country: Finland
- Website: www.ingaforsamling.fi/kyrkor-och-lokaler/degerby-kyrka%20www.ingaforsamling.fi

Architecture
- Architect: Bertel Liljequist
- Completed: 1932; 94 years ago

Specifications
- Capacity: 260

Administration
- Diocese: Porvoo
- Parish: Ingå

The Degerby Church (Swedish: Degerby kyrka; Finnish: Degerbyn kirkko) is the 20th-century church located in the village of Degerby in the Ingå municipality in Uusimaa, Finland. The Empire-style church was designed by Bertel Liljequist and it was completed in 1932.

After World War II, the church was part of the Porkkala area, which was leased to the Soviet Union until 1956. The church was rededicated in 1958, when the area was returned to Finland. Although 10 million Finnish markkas were spent on the church's repair work, it was preserved from destruction because it was actively used by Russian soldiers as a saloon and cinema. The golden cross in the church tower was lost during the lease period, but a new one was added finally in 2018.

The church's 9-tone mechanical Walker pipe organ was acquired in 1965.

== See also ==
- Saint Nicholas Church, Ingå
