= Porkkalanniemi =

Peninsula in Finland

Coordinates: 59°59′N 24°26′E

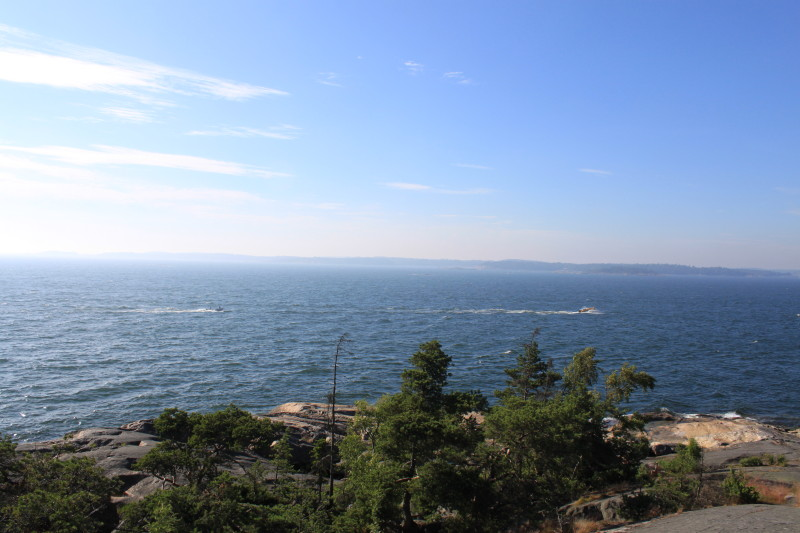
Coastal view of Porkkalanniemi

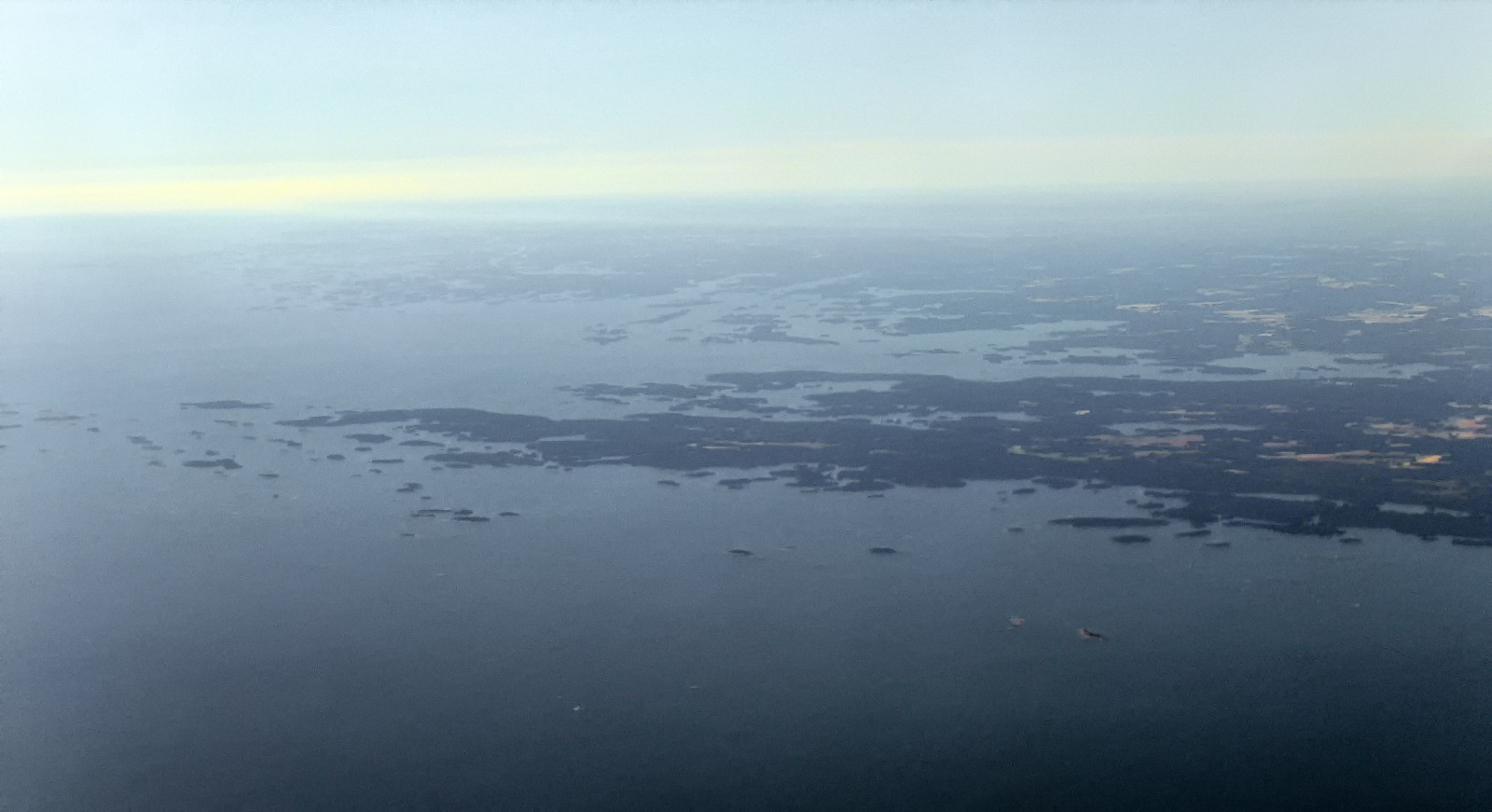
Aerial view of Porkkala

Porkkalanniemi (Swedish: Porkala udd), often referred to simply as Porkkala (Porkala), is a peninsula in the Gulf of Finland, located at Kirkkonummi (Kyrkslätt) in Southern Finland.

The peninsula had great strategic value, as coastal artillery based there would be able to shoot more than halfway across the Gulf of Finland. If the same power controlled the Estonian coast, on the opposite side of the gulf, it would then be able to block Saint Petersburg's naval access to the Baltic Sea. The distance to Estonia at the closest point is only 36 km (22 mi). Porkkala is furthermore located only 30 kilometers (19 mi) from Helsinki, the Finnish capital, and a foreign power based there would be able to exert significant pressure on the Finnish government.

Nowadays, the coasts of the peninsula are popular birdwatching areas during the spring migrations of Arctic geese and other waterfowl.

== History ==
At the end of the Second World War, the Soviet Union secured the rights of lease to a naval base at Porkkala, in accordance with the Moscow Armistice agreement that ended the Continuation War between Finland and the Soviets on 19 September 1944.

Porkkala thus replaced the peninsula of Hanko, which had been leased to the Soviets as a naval base in 1940–41. A large area centered on the peninsula, including land from the municipalities of Kirkkonummi, Siuntio and Ingå and almost the entire area of Degerby, was leased to the USSR from 29 September 1944, ten days after the armistice. At the time of the Soviet take-over of the area, there were about 7200 Finnish inhabitants and all were evacuated during ten days in September 1944.

Beyond its military use, the naval base served to apply political pressure on the Finnish governments and also to help build a Soviet espionage network.

It was immediately placed under a military commander, Neon Antonov (1907–1948), who remained in office until June 1945, when he was transferred to command the Amur River flotilla, in preparation for the war against Japan.

According to the armistice of 1944, the area was leased to the Soviet Union for 50 years. On 10 February 1947, the Paris Peace Treaty reaffirmed the Soviet Union's right to occupy the area until 1994.

No Soviet civilian administration was set up; the Soviet Union simply administered it through the military commander of Porkkala, a post held until 26 January 1956 by Sergey Kabanov (1901–1973), the former Commander of Hanko naval base.

At the height of the naval base operations, about 30,000 Soviet troops were stationed in the area along with some 10,000 Soviet officials and civilians such as members of officers' families.

While under Soviet control, Finnish passenger trains running between Helsinki and Turku were in 1947 allowed to use the railway through the area under payment of fees. However, all train windows had to be closed with shutters, and photography was prohibited during the 40 km (25 mile) transition.

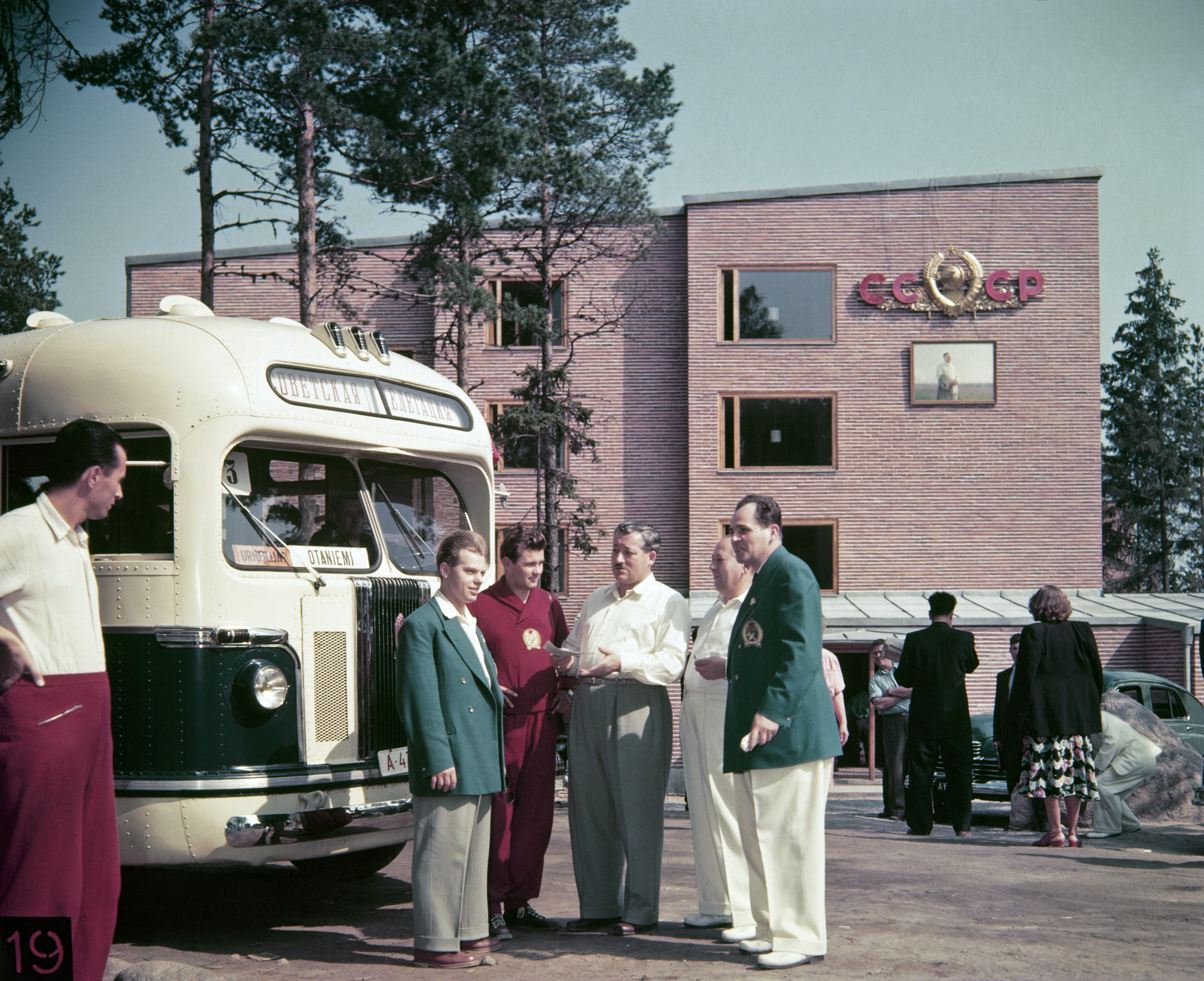
The competition village of the Soviet Olympic team in Otaniemi

During the 1952 Summer Olympics in Helsinki, the Soviet Olympic team was housed on the base, rather than in the Olympic village.

Although the Soviet lease for Porkkala had been conceded for 50 years, an agreement was reached to return it earlier. The agreement was signed on 19 September 1955, exactly 11 years after the armistice, and control of the area reverted to Finland on 26 January 1956. This may be attributed to the process of Finlandization and to technological progress making coastal artillery obsolete, in the era of nuclear weapons. The renunciation of Stalinism by the Soviet Union under Nikita Khrushchev and Finland's neutrality and remaining out of NATO were also important contributing factors.

Upon re-entering the area, the Finns found that the Soviets had destroyed about 50% of civilian housing and 80% of commercial properties which had been handed over in 1944. New constructions included a deep port in Båtvik and an airfield in Friggesby. The airfield was immediately demolished and returned to farmland and the majority of the evacuated population returned to their former homes. By the end of the 1960s, most traces of the Soviet tenure had been erased.

Currently, the Porkkala area houses one of the main bases of the Finnish Navy, located in Upinniemi, near Porkkala proper.

== Gallery of the 1950s Porkkala Restitution ==
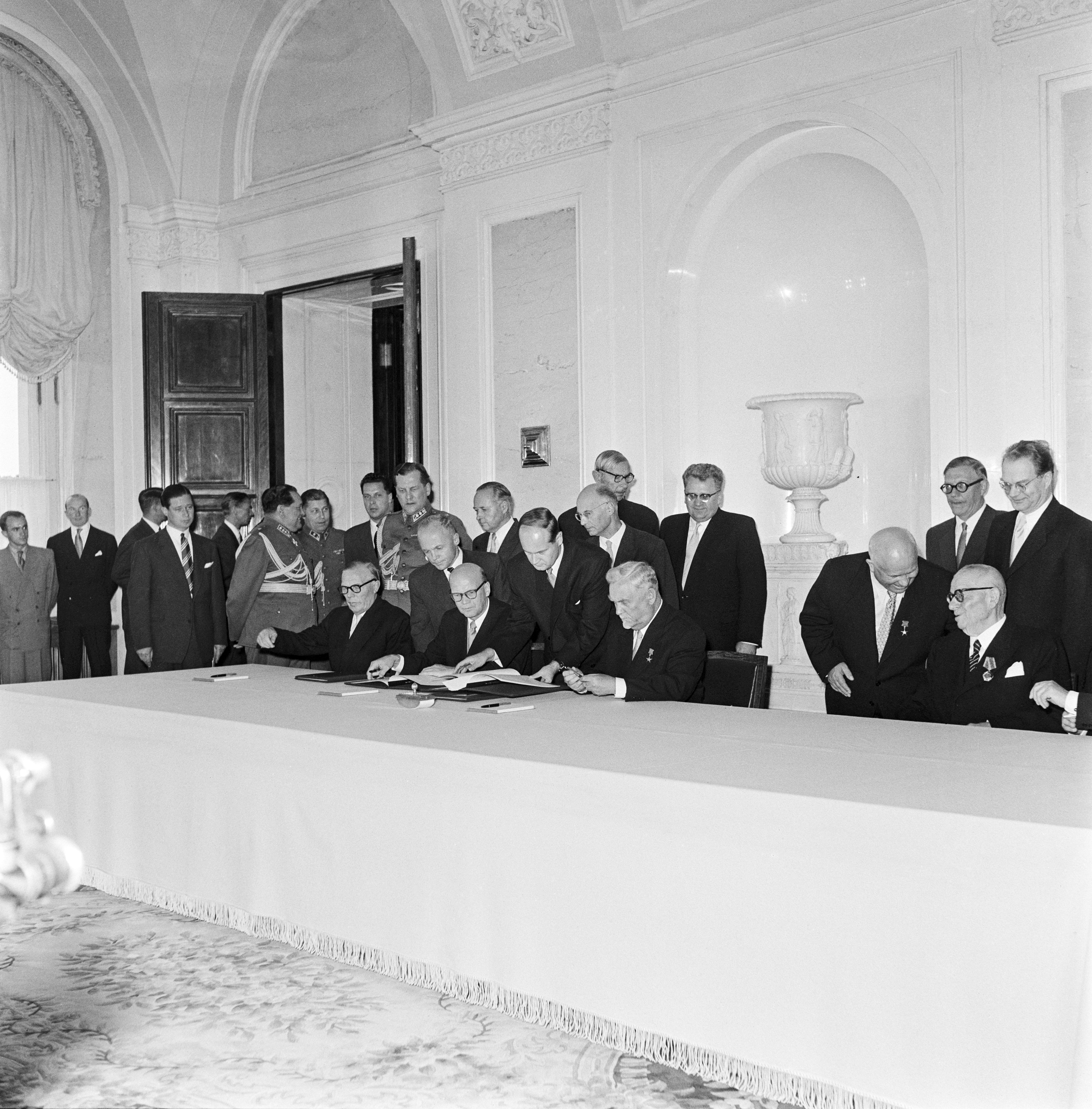
Restitution negotiations of Porkkala in Moscow on September 19, 1955

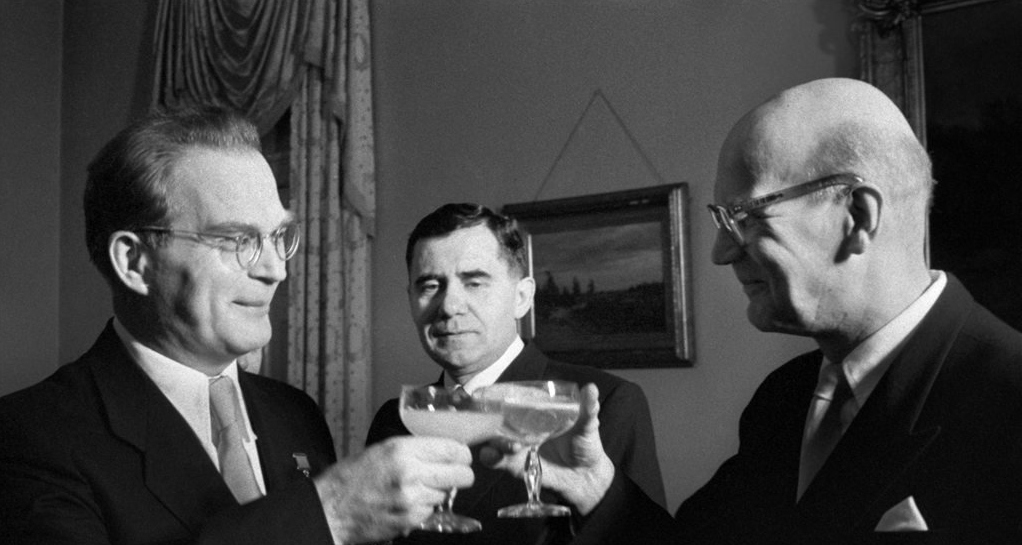
Soviet politicians Mikhail Pervukhin, Andrei Gromyko and the Finnish prime minister Urho Kekkonen, in January 1956, concerning Porkkala.

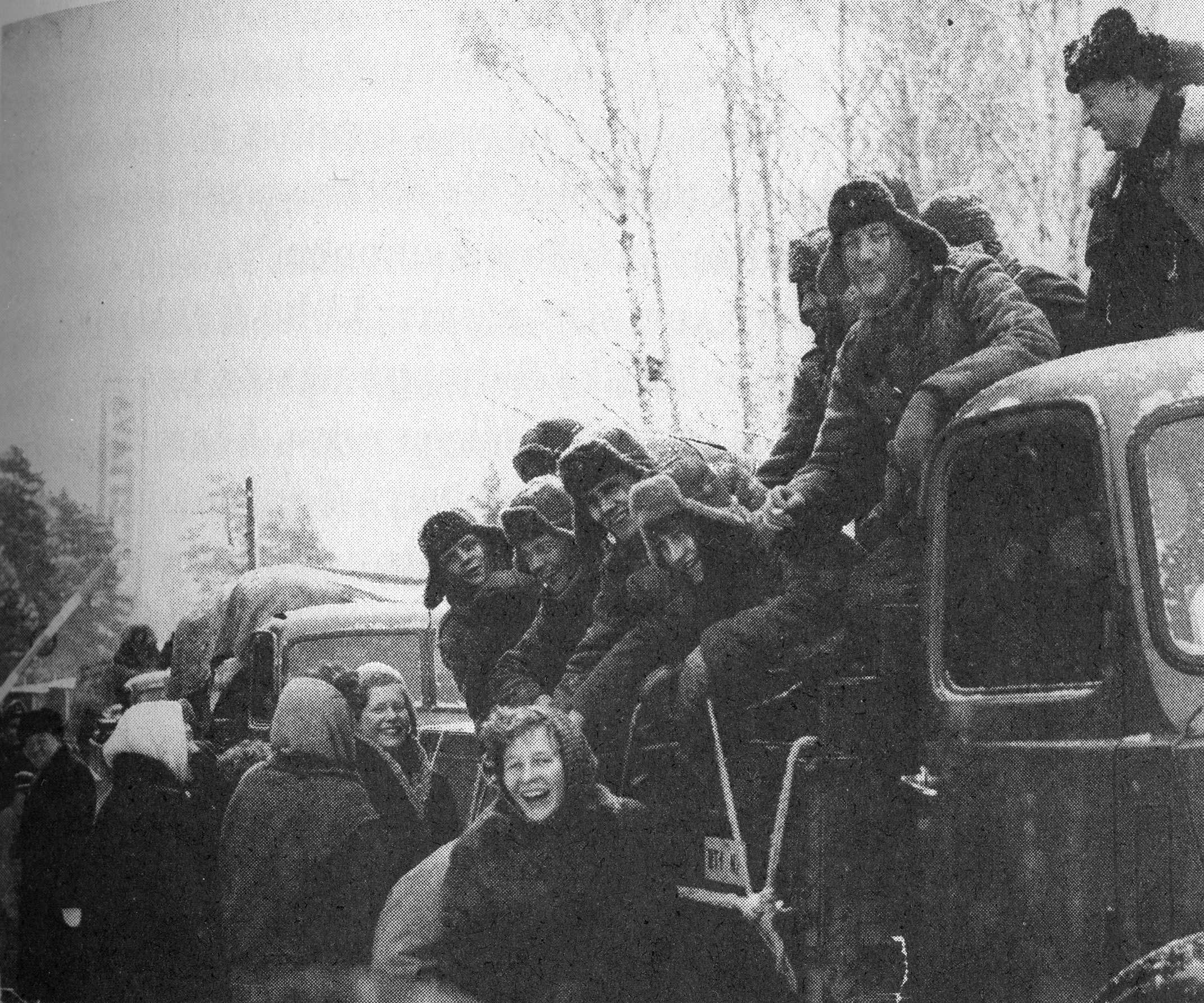
On January 26, 1956, the border gates were opened and the first Finnish troops returned to Porkkala

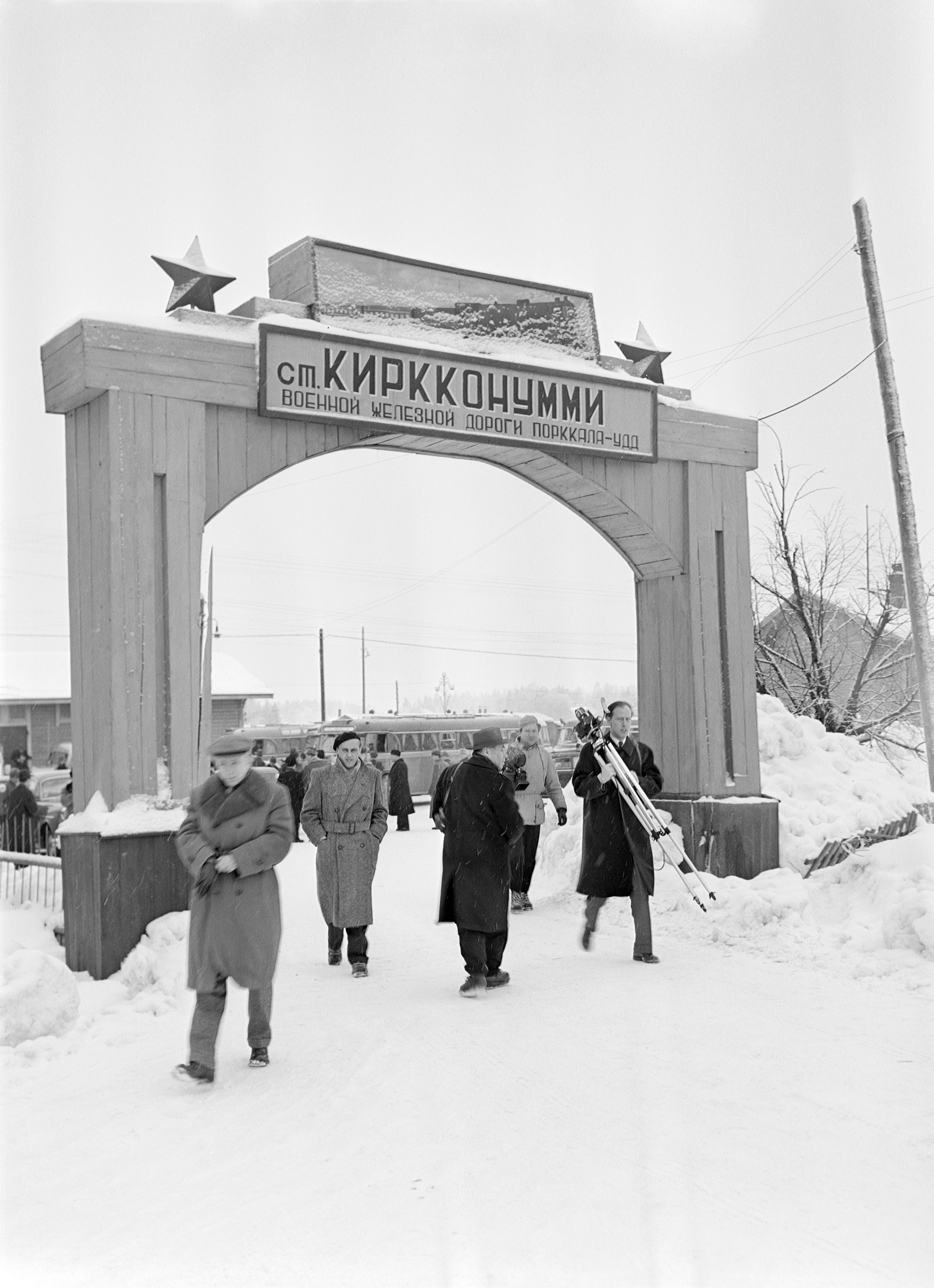
Gate in Porkkala in winter 1956.

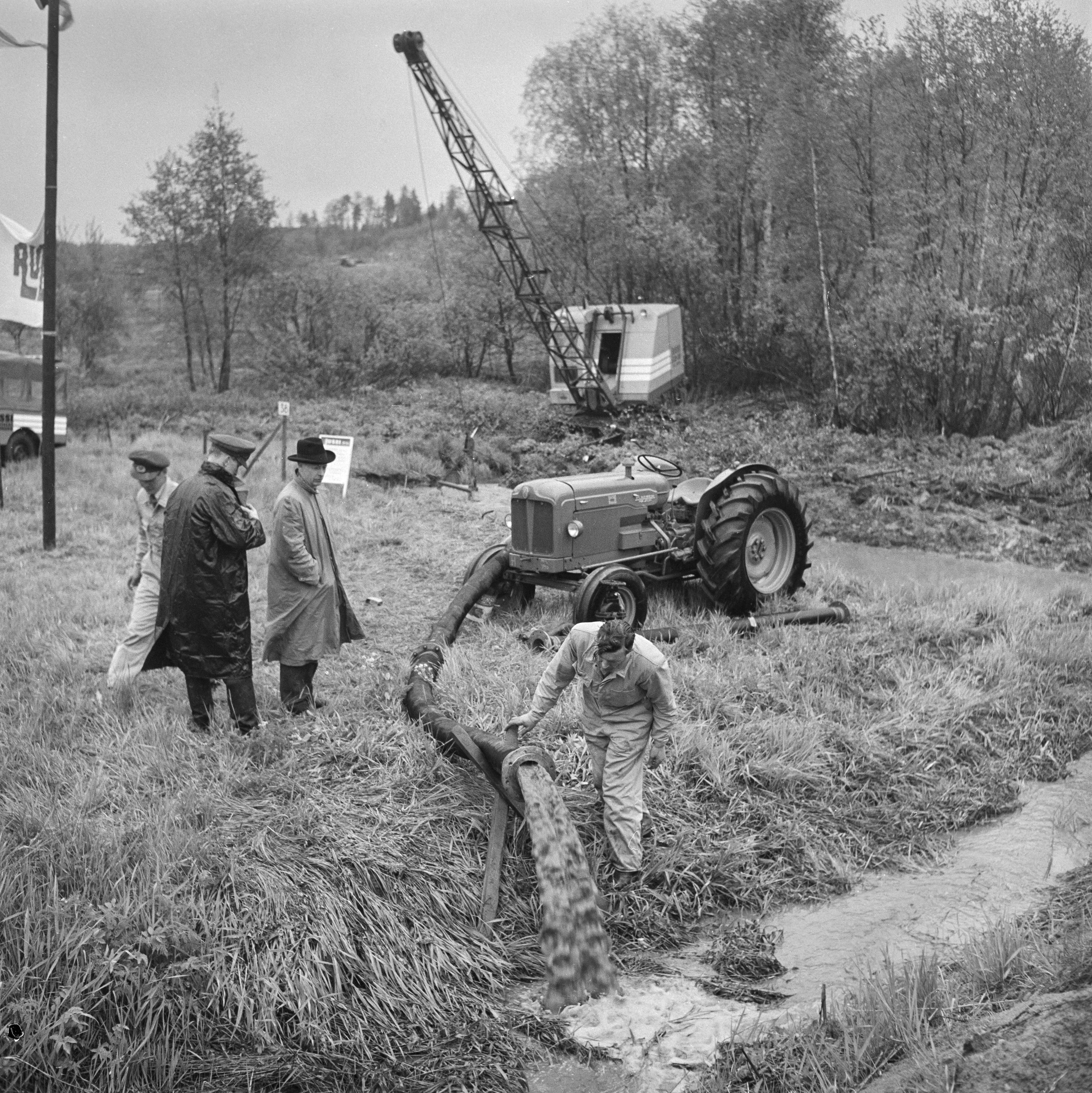
Rebuilding Porkkala in 1957.

== In popular culture ==
The Soviet lease of Porkkala and the return of the area to its former inhabitants are key events in the Finnish Noir mystery, Below the Surface by Leena Lehtolainen. The naval base also forms part of the plot line of the TV series Shadow Lines (Nyrkki).

== See also ==
- Porkkala Kallbåda lighthouse
- Porkkala Rönnskär lighthouse
