= Saint Nicholas Church, Ingå =

Coordinates: 60°02′42″N 24°00′07″E

Ingå Church
- Saint Nicholas Church in Ingå
- S:t Nikolas kyrka, Pyhän Nikolauksen kirkko
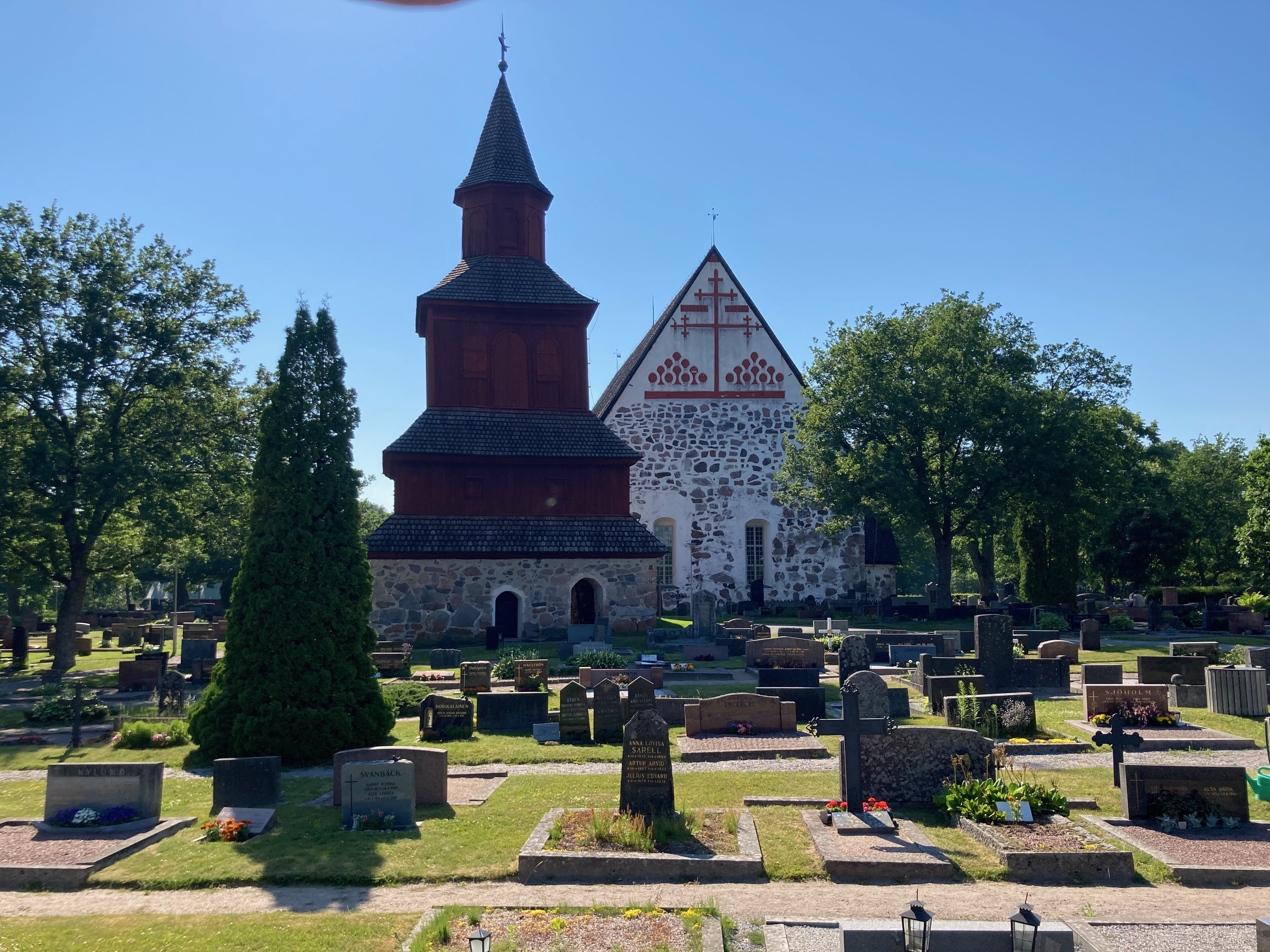
- Ingå Church
- Location: Ingå, Uusimaa
- Country: Finland
- Denomination: Evangelical Lutheran
- Previous denomination: Roman Catholic
- Website: https://www.ingaforsamling.fi/

Architecture
- Heritage designation: Protected by law
- Years built: Late 15th century – early 16th century

Administration
- Diocese: Diocese of Borgå
- Parish: Ingå församling

Saint Nicholas Church of Ingå (Swedish: Ingå S:t Nikolaus kyrka, Finnish: Inkoon Pyhän Nikolaoksen kirkko) is a medieval church in Ingå, Finland. The church is owned by the evangelical-lutheran parish of Ingå.

The Finnish Heritage Agency has listed Ingå church and Ingå vicarage as built environment of state interest. The church is protected by law.

== History and architecture ==
=== Older churches ===
Ingå, which is found in written sources for the first time in 1337, is one of the oldest parishes of western Uusimaa region. Some older churches made of tree have stood on the place of the stone church we see today. The stone walls of Saint Nicholas church also include parts of an even older stone church that once stood on the site.

=== The current church ===
The patron saint of the current medieval stone church is Saint Nicholas, the patron saint of among other things sailors. Studies show us that Ingå church was built in three parts and the oldest parts of the current church are from the 13th century. Archeologist Markus Hiekkanen says that the first masonry work of the current church was carried out in 1430s, the second part of the building process was carried out in the late 15th century and that the final part was done around 1510s.

The brick ornament in the eastern gable of the church differs from other medieval churches of the same era in Finland. This ornament consists of a horizontal band which has a large cross on top of it and some clustered circles on both sides of the cross.

Ingå church is shaped like a rectangle with a sacristy attached to the northern wall. The church porch, which used to be attached to the southern wall, was destroyed and dismantled in the 1840s. Large octagon-shaped pilars divide the church into two naves. There are four bays in the church room and a simple groin vault in the sacristy.

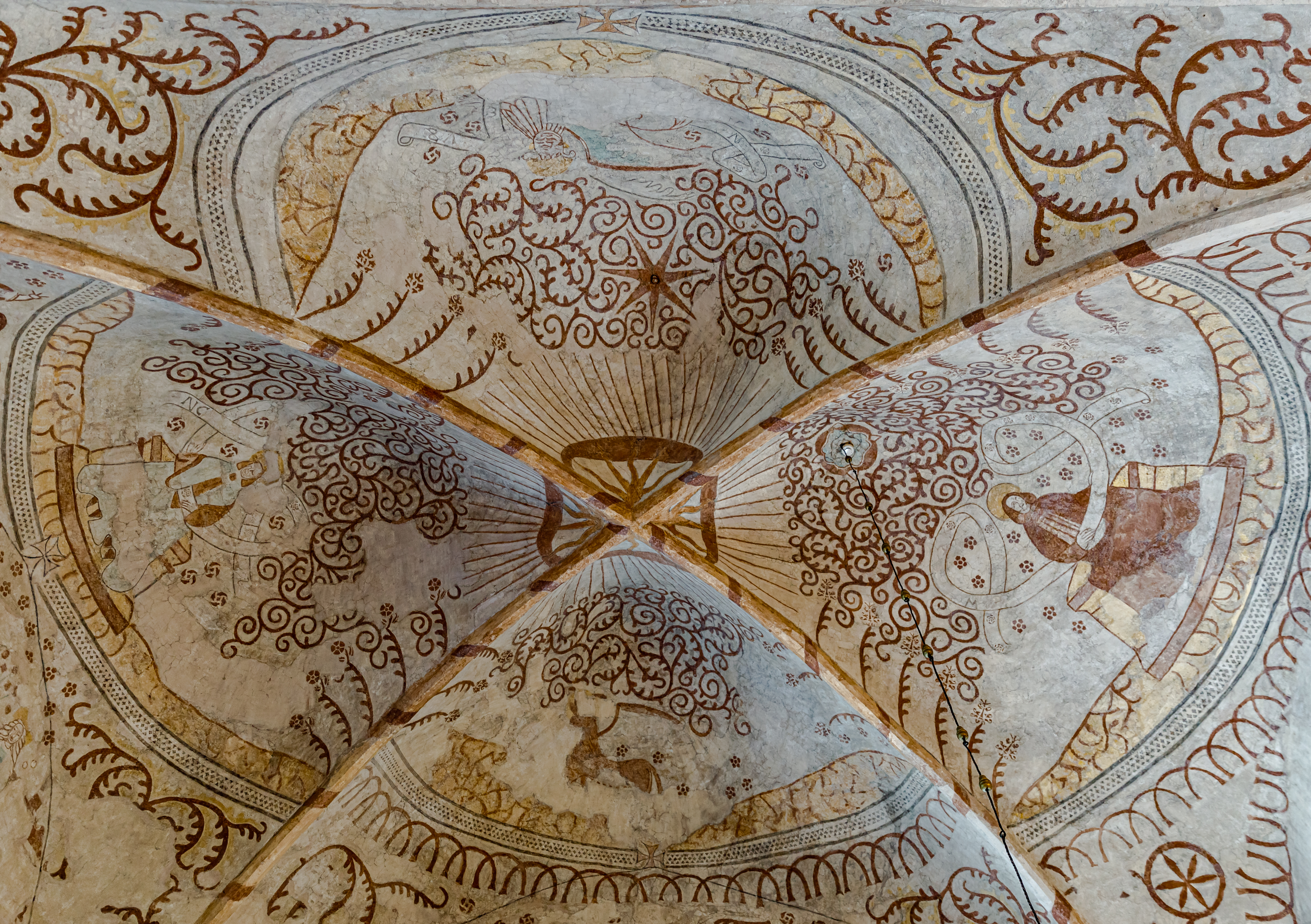
Medieval vault paintings.

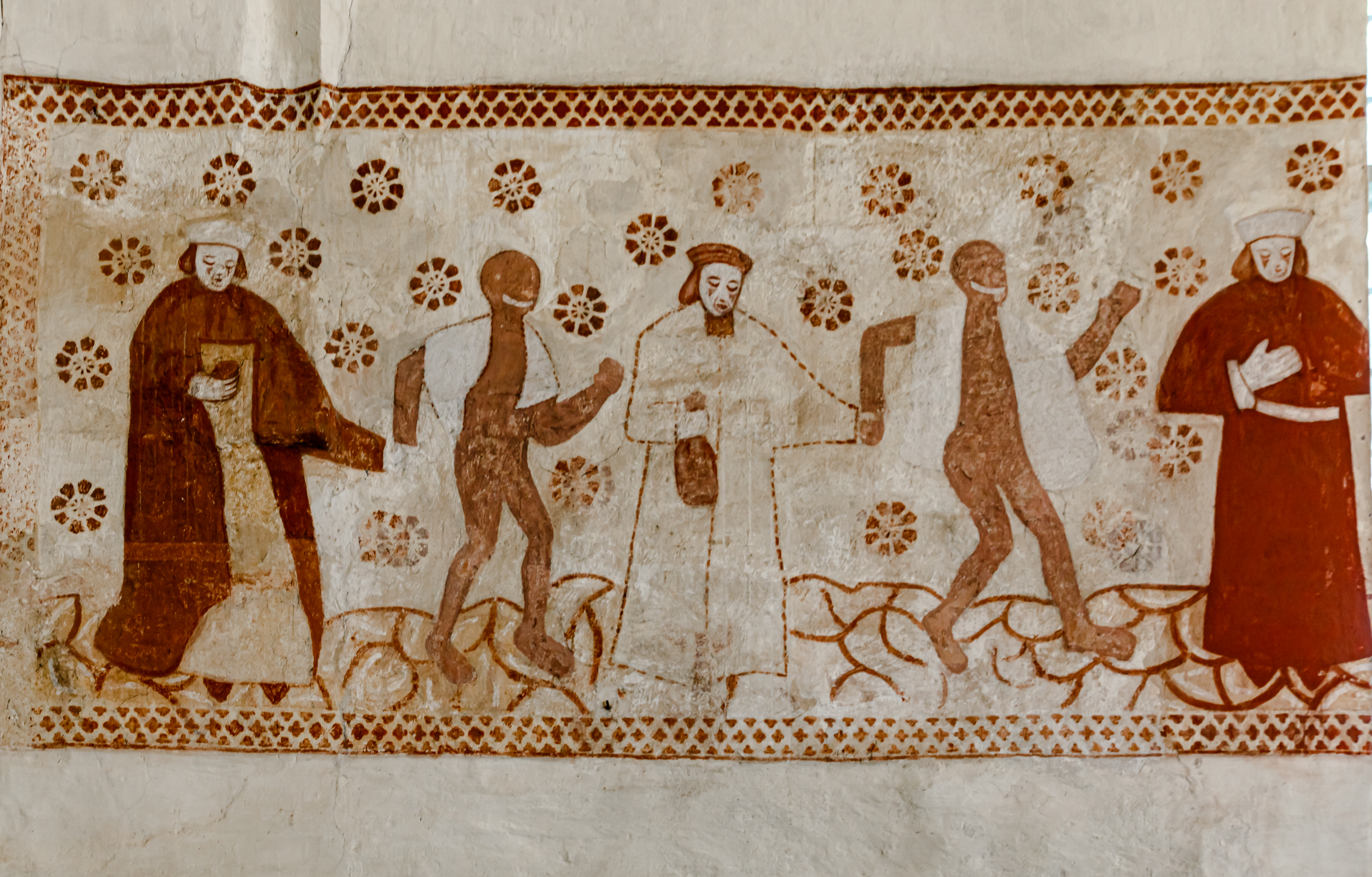
Dance of Death

Before the reformation Ingå church was Roman Catholic. After the reformation the medieval paintings on the walls and vaults of the church were painted over with white paint. Later the paintings were revealed again and conserved. On the northern wall of Ingå church is a unique painting to Finland representing the Danse Macabre also called the Dance of Death. The medieval paintings, which can be dated back in the early 16th century are similar to ones in Espoo Cathedral, Saint Peter's Church in Siuntio and the Church of the Holy Cross in Hattula.

Ingå church has been repaired many times. In 1632 a lightning bolt hit the church which caused the church roof to be destroyed. During the Great Northern War Russian soldiers damaged the church heavily and after the Russian occupation Ingå church got new roof trusses and roofing. At the same time the gables were slightly lowered. In 1818 new windows were opened and the existing windows were broadened under the instructions of master builder Martti Tolppo.

A separate bell tower was constructed next to the church between 1739 and 1740.

== Interior and points of interest ==
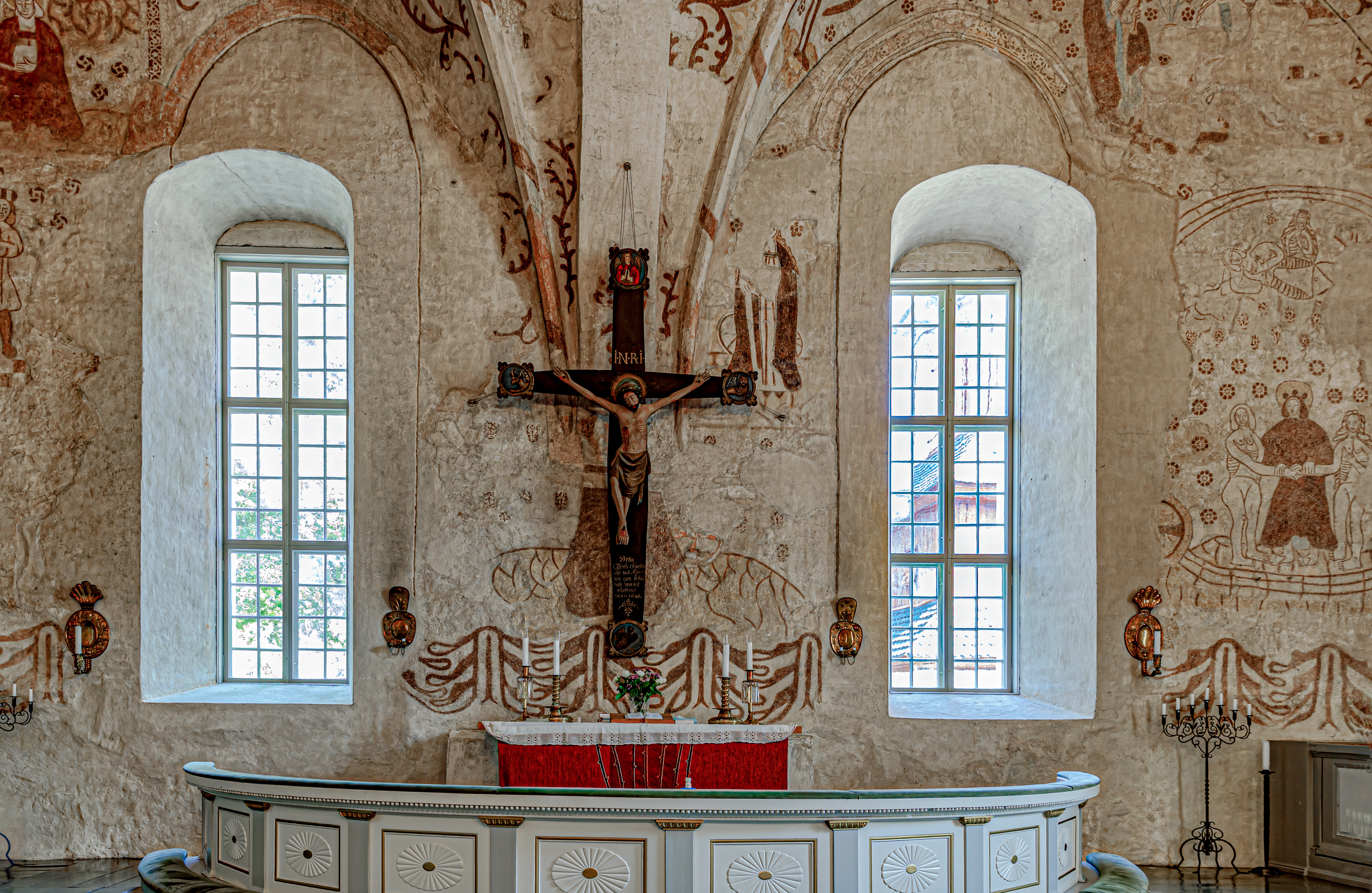
Altar

The organ with 21 registers was made by Åkerman & Lund and installed inside Ingå church in 1989. There's also a large triumphal crucifix inside the church which dates back to the 14th century.

The monument on the military grave yard was designed by architect Arne Rancken in 1949.

== See also ==
- Degerby Church
