= List of shipwrecks in September 1879 =

The list of shipwrecks in September 1879 includes ships sunk, foundered, grounded, or otherwise lost during September 1879.

== 1 September ==
List of shipwrecks: 1 September 1879
| Ship | State | Description |
|---|---|---|
| Familiens Haab | Denmark | The schooner ran aground in the Scheldt. She was on a voyage from Antwerp, Belgium to Veracruz, Mexico. She was refloated and put in to Vlissingen, Zeeland, Netherlands in a leaky condition. |
| Halo, and an unnamed vessel | United Kingdom | The steamship Halo collided with a dredger at Hartlepool, County Durham. Both vessels were severely damaged. Halo was on a voyage from Hartlepool to a Baltic port. |
| Hertha | Germany | The brig collided with the brig Mina (Sweden) and was wrecked off the Kullen Lighthouse, Sweden with the loss of two of her crew. |
| Kilburn | United Kingdom | The steamship struck the quayside at Liverpool, Lancashire and was beached onn the Cheshire bank of the River Mersey. She was on a voyage from Workington, Cumberland to Liverpool. |
| Ville de Nantes | France | The steamship collided with the steamship Marie (France at Bordeaux, Gironde and sank at the stern. |

== 2 September ==
List of shipwrecks: 2 September 1879
| Ship | State | Description |
|---|---|---|
| Delfina | Flag unknown | The steamship was wrecked at Corral, Chile with the loss of one life. |
| Paraguay | France | The steamship ran aground on the English Bank, in the River Plate. She was on a voyage from France to Montevideo, Uruguay. She was refloated and resumed her voyage. |
| Vigilant | United Kingdom | The schooner was wrecked on the Petershene Flats, in the Bristol Channel. Her crew were rescued. She was on a voyage from Newport, Monmouthshire to Bantry, County Cork. |
| Unnamed | Italy | The smack was run down and sunk off Salerno by the steamship Norma (United Kingdom). |

== 3 September ==
List of shipwrecks: 3 September 1879
| Ship | State | Description |
|---|---|---|
| Favourite | United Kingdom | The fishing boat sank off the coast of Argyllshire with the loss of all three crew. |
| J. Bertschey | United States | The screw steamer sprung a leak in a violent gale on Lake Huron and ran aground in an attempt to beach her near Grindstone City, Michigan and broke up. Her crew of 32 and 19 passengers were rescued by the United States Life Saving Service. |
| Luna | United Kingdom | The barque was run down and sunk by the steamship Belgenland (Belgium) with the loss of six of her eleven crew. Survivors were rescued by Belgenland. Luna was on a voyage from Puerto Rico to Queenstown, County Cork, United Kingdom. |
| Quebec | United Kingdom | The steamship was driven ashore on East Point, Prince Edward Island, Canada. Her 60 passengers were taken off by HMS Griffon (Royal Navy). Quebec was on a voyage from Liverpool, Lancashire to Halifax, Nova Scotia and Montreal, Quebec, Canada. She was refloated on 7 September and taken in to Montreal. |
| Salamander | United Kingdom | The schooner collided with the steam collier Lycham (United Kingdom) and sank 10 miles (16 km) off Hartland Point . Her crew were rescued by Lycham. Salamander was on a voyage from Neath, Glamorgan to Charleston, South Carolina, United States. |
| Schlump Zu Lulie | Germany | The brig was driven ashore on Amager, Denmark. She was on a voyage from Newcastle upon Tyne, Northumberland, United Kingdom to Riga, Russia. |
| St. Vincent | United Kingdom | The ship caught fire in the Thames Estuary. She was on a voyage from London to Adelaide, South Australia. She put in to Gravesend, Kent. |
| Wabjerg | Norway | The schooner was driven ashore at Ronehamn, Gotland, Sweden. She was on a voyage from Pori, Grand Duchy of Finland to Phillippeville, Algeria. |

== 4 September ==
List of shipwrecks: 4 September 1879
| Ship | State | Description |
|---|---|---|
| Arzilla | United Kingdom | The ship ran aground at Cardiff, Glamorgan. She was on a voyage from Cardiff to Rio de Janeiro, Brazil. |
| Columbia | Norway | The barque was holed following a collision with either a fish or "some other sea monster". Columbia sank within thirty minutes of the crew taking to two boats and were picked up by the steamship Plealand (Netherlands on 9 September. Columbia was on a voyage from London, United Kingdom to Quebec City, Canada. |
| Whitley | United Kingdom | The steamship ran aground at Dunkirk, Nord, France. She was on a voyage from Odesa, Russia to Dunkirk. She was refloated. |

== 5 September ==
List of shipwrecks: 5 September 1879
| Ship | State | Description |
|---|---|---|
| Alaska | United States | The steamboat was severely damaged by a boiler explosion in Lake Erie with the loss of two lives. Nine people were wounded. She was towed in to Amherstburg, Ontario, Canada by the steamship City of Detroit (United States). |
| Jean Marie | France | The ship was driven ashore on Læsø, Denmark. She was on a voyage from Saint Petersburg, Russia to Saint-Malo, Ille-et-Vilaine. |
| Wassely | Russia | The barque was driven ashore at Narva. Her crew were rescued. |
| 518 | Russia | The lighter sprang a leak and sank off Hogland. |

== 6 September ==
List of shipwrecks: 6 September 1879
| Ship | State | Description |
|---|---|---|
| Acklam | United Kingdom | The steamship collided with the steamship Emerald (United Kingdom) and sank in the North Sea 15 nautical miles (28 km) east of Flamborough Head, Yorkshire. Her crew were rescued. Acklam was on a voyage from Trondheim, Norway to Lowestoft, Suffolk. |
| Brest | United Kingdom | The steamship ran ashore at Polbarrow near The Lizard, Cornwall with the loss of five lives. Two passengers were reported missing. The rest of her 430 passengers and crew were rescued by the Cadgewith Lifeboat Joseph Armstrong ( Royal National Lifeboat Institution), local fishing boats and the Coastguard. Brest was on a voyage from Havre de Grâce, Seine-Inférieure, France to Liverpool, Lancashire. |
| Crest | United Kingdom | The steamship ran aground in the Bristol Channel off Penarth, Glamorgan. She was on a voyage from Cardiff, Glamorgan to Montreal, Quebec, Canada. |
| John Howard, and Morgan Richards | United Kingdom | The steamships collided in the Bristol Channel off Nash Point, Glamorgan. John Howard foundered. She was on a voyage from Cardiff to Palermo, Sicily, Italy. Morgan Richards was severely damaged. She was on a voyage from Cardiff to Malta. She put back to Cardiff. |
| Meirion | United Kingdom | The full-rigged ship ran aground on Rickham Sands, east of Salcombe harbour, Devon. Her crew were rescued. She was on a voyage from Rangoon, Burma to London. |
| Unnamed | Flag unknown | The brig foundered off Clonakilty, County Cork, United Kingdom with the loss of all hands. |

== 7 September ==
List of shipwrecks: 7 September 1879
| Ship | State | Description |
|---|---|---|
| Arabian | United Kingdom | The steamship ran aground near Amlwch, Anglesey. |
| Constantine | United Kingdom | The steamship ran ashore at Flamborough Head, Yorkshire. She was on a voyage from London to the River Tyne. She was refloated and resumed her voyage. |
| J. A. Hoites | Netherlands | The brig was driven ashore at Aracaju, Brazil. She was on a voyage from Porto Alegre to Pernambuco. She was a total loss. |
| Lady Matthewson | United Kingdom | The schooner was run down and sunk in the North Sea off Scarborough, North Riding of Yorkshire by the steamship Jeannie (United Kingdom). Her crew were rescued by Jeannie. Lady Matthewson was on a voyage from Seaham, County Durham to Rochester, Kent. |
| Lear, or Zoar | United Kingdom | The schooner was run down and sunk in the North Sea off Flamborough Head by the steamship Mid Surrey (United Kingdom). All on board were rescued by Mid Surrey. The schooner was on a voyage from Middlesbrough, Yorkshire to London. |
| Mallard | United Kingdom | The steamship ran ashore at Flamborough Head. She was on a voyage from London to the River Tyne. |
| Ste Anne | France | The chasse-marée collided with the barque Inch Marnoch (United Kingdom) and sank off Dover, Kent. Her crew were rescued by Inch Marnoch. Ste Anne was on a voyage from Dunkirk, Nord to Brest, Finistère. |

== 8 September ==
List of shipwrecks: 8 September 1879
| Ship | State | Description |
|---|---|---|
| Duke of Wellington | United Kingdom | The barque was driven ashore and wrecked on Sanday, Orkney Islands. Her crew were rescued. She was on a voyage from Newcastle upon Tyne, Northumberland to Cartagena, Spain. |
| Juliana | Germany | The ship foundered in the Dogger Bank. Her crew were rescued by a Dutch fishing smack. She was on a voyage from Fraserburgh, Aberdeenshire, United Kingdom to Hamburg. |
| Laurel | New Zealand | The schooner sprang a leak off the Kaikoura Coast, New Zealand. The crew were rescued by the barque Mary Bell; the Laurel foundered somewhere close to Cook Strait. |
| Mary | United Kingdom | The schooner was driven ashore near Charlestown, Cornwall. She was refloated and taken in to Charlestown. |
| Medway | United Kingdom | The steamship was driven ashore on Vlieland, Friesland, Netherlands. She was on a voyage from Riga, Russia to Southampton, Hampshire. She was refloated and resumed her voyage. |
| Veritas | United Kingdom | The ship was driven ashore at Pori, Grand Duchy of Finland. She was refloated on 12 September and found to be severely leaky. |
| Victoria | United Kingdom | The ship was driven ashore and wrecked at Breaksea Point, Glamorgan. She was on a voyage from Bideford, Devon to Newport, Monmouthshire. |
| Two unnamed vessels | Russia | The lighters sank at Saint Petersburg. |
| Unnamed | Chile | The hulk was destroyed by fire at Valparaíso. |

== 9 September ==
List of shipwrecks: 9 September 1879
| Ship | State | Description |
|---|---|---|
| Ann | France | The brigantine ran aground in Pegwell Bay. She was on a voyage from Söderhamn, Sweden to Quiberon, Morbihan. She was refloated and taken in to Ramsgate, Kent, United Kingdom. |
| Colombo | United Kingdom | The steamship ran aground at the Bec d'Ambès. She was on a voyage from New Orleans, Louisiana, United States to Bordeaux, Gironde, France. |
| Colombo | United Kingdom | The schooner ran aground on the Sunderland Bank, in the Irish Sea off the coast of Lancashire. She was on a voyage from Hamburg, Germany to Glasson Dock, Lancashire. She was refloated and found to be leaky. |
| Crest | United Kingdom | The steamship ran aground off Penarth Head, Glamorgan. |
| Ellen | United Kingdom | The schooner was abandoned in Cardigan Bay. Her three crew were rescued by the lifeboat John Stuart ( Royal National Lifeboat Institution). Ellen was on a voyage from Beaumaris, Anglesey to Bristol, Gloucestershire. |
| Favourite | United Kingdom | The Bute fishing boat was lost near Loch Fyne. All three crew drowned. |
| Knight Templar | United Kingdom | The steamship ran aground at Cardiff, Glamorgan. She was on a voyage from Cardiff to Savannah, Georgia, United States. |
| Levant | United Kingdom | The steamship ran aground off Cape Panomie, Greece. |
| Magdalena | Sweden | The barque was driven ashore at the Rönnskär Lighthouse, Grand Duchy of Finland with the loss of seven of her crew. She was on a voyage from London, United Kingdom to Umeå. |
| Teutonia | Germany | The brig was wrecked at the mouth of the Opobo. Her crew were rescued. |

== 10 September ==
List of shipwrecks: 10 September 1879
| Ship | State | Description |
|---|---|---|
| Boston | United Kingdom | The steamship ran aground at Cardiff, Glamorgan. She was on a voyage from Cardiff to Dieppe, Seine-Inférieure, France. |
| Corinthian | United Kingdom | The steamship ran aground in the Clyde. She was on a voyage from Greenock, Renfrewshire to Montreal, Quebec, Canada. She was refloated and put back to Greenock in a leaky condition. |
| Flora | United Kingdom | The ship ran aground at Maassluis, South Holland, Netherlands. She was on a voyage from Methil, Fife to Rotterdam, South Holland. She was refloated and found to be severely leaky. |
| Harvey | United Kingdom | The schooner ran aground at Cardiff. She was on a voyage from Cardiff to Dungarvan, County Waterford. |
| Philippine | United Kingdom | The barque struck a rock in the Kangean Islands, Netherlands East Indies. She was on a voyage from Hong Kong to Melbourne, Victoria. |
| Saga | United Kingdom | The steamship ran aground on the Stubbegrunden, in the Baltic Sea, She was on a voyage from Kronstadt, Russia to an English port. She was refloated. |

== 11 September ==
List of shipwrecks: 11 September 1879
| Ship | State | Description |
|---|---|---|
| Corinna | United Kingdom | The barque was run into by the steamship Zeeland (Belgium) and sank off Dungeness, Kent with the loss of four of the eleven people on board. Survivors were rescued by Zeeland. Corinna was on a voyage from Colombo, Ceylon to London. |
| Eleanor | United Kingdom | The schooner was driven ashore at Maryport, Cumberland. She was on a voyage from Dublin to Maryport. |
| Florence | United States | The whaler, a schooner, was wrecked on the coast of Greenland. Her crew survived. |
| Hope | (United Kingdom of Great Britain and Ireland) Isle of Man | The schooner was driven ashore and wrecked at Langness. Her crew were rescued. |
| Ocean | Norway | The barque was driven ashore at Summerhouse Point, Glamorgan, United Kingdom. She was on a voyage from Cardiff, Glamorgan to a Baltic port. She was refloated on 13 September and put back to Cardiff. |

== 12 September ==
List of shipwrecks: 12 September 1879
| Ship | State | Description |
|---|---|---|
| Ægean | United Kingdom | The steamship was damaged by fire at Galle, Ceylon. |
| Fernwood | United Kingdom | The steamship collided with the quayside at Havre de Grâce, Seine-Inférieure and sank at the bow. |
| Hobah | United Kingdom | The ketch was run into by the paddle steamer Albert Edward (United Kingdom) and sank at Ryde, Isle of Wight. Her crew were rescued. |
| Libra | Sweden | The ship ran aground on the Lemon and Ower Sand. She was on a voyage from Hudiksvall to Bilbao, Spain. She was refloated and taken in to Gravesend, Kent, United Kingdom. |
| Messenger | New Zealand | The barque was wrecked on the Farewell Spit. |

== 13 September ==
List of shipwrecks: 13 September 1879
| Ship | State | Description |
|---|---|---|
| Monitor | United Kingdom | The full-rigged ship ran aground on the Eggegrund. She was refloated and towed in to Gävle. |
| Zephyr | Norway | The schooner ran aground in the Opobo. She was burnt to prevent plunder by the local inhabitants. |

== 14 September ==
List of shipwrecks: 14 September 1879
| Ship | State | Description |
|---|---|---|
| Vorige | Norway | The steamship sank at Bergen. |

== 16 September ==
List of shipwrecks: 16 September 1879
| Ship | State | Description |
|---|---|---|
| Germania | Germany | The schooner collided with the steamship Antelope (United Kingdom) and sank off Wendorf, Her crew were rescued. |
| Jane and Margaret | United Kingdom | The smack was wrecked at Goodwick, Pembrokeshire. Her three crew were rescued by the Coastguard. |
| Shepherdess | New Zealand | The 30-ton schooner was driven ashore at Charleston, New Zealand and broke up. She had gone aground in May of the same year at Kaikoura, but had been refloated. |
| Unnamed | Flag unknown | The schooner was run down and sunk in Chesapeake Bay by the steamship Puerto Rico (Spain) with the loss of all on board. |

== 17 September ==
List of shipwrecks: 17 September 1879
| Ship | State | Description |
|---|---|---|
| Glaneur | France | The brigantine was run down and sunk in the English Channel 15 nautical miles (28 km) off Beachy Head, Sussex, United Kingdom by a steamship. Six of her eight crew were rescued by the fishing smack Albert Victor (United Kingdom); the others were rescued by the steamship. |
| Norman | United Kingdom | The steamship ran aground on Saltholmen, Denmark. She was refloated the next day and resumed her voyage. |
| Primitive | United Kingdom | The fishing lugger was run down and sunk in the North Sea by the steamship Talisman (Netherlands). Her crew were rescued by Talisman. |
| Raaf | Netherlands | The brigantine was wrecked at the mouth of the Opobo River, Africa. Her crew survived. |

== 18 September ==
List of shipwrecks: 18 September 1879
| Ship | State | Description |
|---|---|---|
| Malakoff | United Kingdom | The fishing lugger was run into by the steamship Erith and sank off Robin Hood's Bay, Yorkshire with the loss of three of her crew. |
| Parsee | United Kingdom | The ship ran aground at Chittagong, India. She was on a voyage from Chittagong to Dundee, Forfarshire. She was refloated and resumed her voyage. |

== 19 September ==
List of shipwrecks: 19 September 1879
| Ship | State | Description |
|---|---|---|
| Blair Athole | United Kingdom | The steam lighter was run into by the tug Flying Foam (United Kingdom) and sank in the Clyde. |
| Cardenas | United Kingdom | The ship struck the Runnel Stone. She was on a voyage from Trinidad to London. She was towed in to Falmouth, Cornwall in a leaky condition by the tug Gratitude (United Kingdom). |
| Esperance | United Kingdom | The schooner was run down and sunk off Start Point, Devon by the steamship Leverrier (United Kingdom). Her crew were rescued by Leverrier. Esperance was on a voyage from Brixham, Devon to Cádiz, Spain. |
| Fanny | United Kingdom | The smack was run into by the smack Young Joe and sank in the North Sea 20 nautical miles (37 km) off Spurn Point, Yorkshire. Her crew were rescued by Young Joe. |
| Harry S. Edwards | United Kingdom | The steamship ran aground at Trelleborg, Sweden. She was on a voyage from Newcastle upon Tyne, Northumberland to a Baltic port. She was refloated and taken in to Copenhagen, Denmark. |
| Kron Prinz | Germany | The ship ran aground on the Potato Garth. She was on a voyage from Hamburg to Sunderland, County Durham, United Kingdom. She was refloated. She was refloated. |
| Messenger | Unknown | The barque grounded on Farewell Spit, New Zealand, while en route from Lyttelton to Newcastle, New South Wales. Crew took to the lifeboats; the barque became a wreck. |

== 20 September ==
List of shipwrecks: 20 September 1879
| Ship | State | Description |
|---|---|---|
| Ajeca | United Kingdom | The ship, a barque or a schooner, was wrecked at "Santa Anna", on the coast of Tabasco, Mexico. |
| Amelia | Netherlands | The brig was wrecked at "Santa Anna". Her crew were rescued. |
| Bertha | Germany | The ship was wrecked at "Santa Anna". Her crew were rescued. She was on a voyage from Montego Bay, Jamaica to Tabasco. |
| Countess of Fife | United Kingdom | The barque was wrecked at "Santa Anna" with the loss of two of her crew. |
| Diamante | France | The barque collided with a British steamship and was beached at Motril, Spain. She was on a voyage from Marseille, Bouches-du-Rhône to Cayenne, French Guiana. |
| Eliza French | Germany | The barque was wrecked at "Santa Anna". |
| Else Eschricht | United Kingdom | The barque was wrecked at "Santa Anna". |
| Grijalva | Denmark | The brig was wrecked at "Santa Anna". |
| Hattie Pettis | United Kingdom | The brig was wrecked at "Santa Anna". |
| Heligoland | Norway | The barque was wrecked at "Santa Anna". |
| Herdis | France | The schooner ran aground on the Goodwin Sands, Kent, United Kingdom. She was on a voyage from Rouen, Seine-Inférieure to Saint Petersburg, Russia. She was refloated with assistance and taken in to The Downs. |
| Laurence et Melainie | France | The barque was wrecked at "Santa Anna". |
| Maria Catherine | United Kingdom | The ship sprang a leak in the Irish Sea 20 nautical miles (37 km) north of Point Lynas, Anglesey. She was beached in the Belfast Lough. She was on a voyage from Bangor, Caernarfonshire to Aberdeen. |
| Mary | United Kingdom | The barque was wrecked at "Santa Anna". |
| Nicholine | United Kingdom | The barque was wrecked at "Santa Anna". |
| Rapid | Sweden | The schooner was wrecked at Pori, Grand Duchy of Finland. |
| Shincliffe | United Kingdom | The ship, a brig nor a barque, was wrecked at "Santa Anna". |
| Sylvanus Blanchard | United States | The ship was abandoned in the Atlantic Ocean (12°20′N 26°10′W). The captain and nine men were picked up by Vale of Nith (United Kingdom). Seven crew in the other boat were rescued by River Lagan (United Kingdom). Sylvanus Blanchard was on a voyage from Liverpool, Lancashire, United Kingdom to Rio de Janeiro, Brazil. |
| Synia | Norway | The brig ran aground at the Rönnskär Lighthouse, Grand Duchy of Finland. She was on a voyage from Kotka, Grand Duchy of Finland to Leith, Lothian, United Kingdom. She was refloated and taken in to Helsinki, Grand Duchy of Finland. |
| HMS Vigilant | Royal Navy | The dispatch boat ran aground in the Hai River. She was on a voyage from Yantai, China to Hong Kong. She was refloated on 22 September and resumed her voyage. |

== 21 September ==
List of shipwrecks: 21 September 1879
| Ship | State | Description |
|---|---|---|
| Erith | United Kingdom | The steam collier collided with the steamship Orwell and sank in the Lower Hope Reach off Gravesend, Kent. Her crew were landed at Gravesend. |
| Harriet Brewster | Norway | The barque was abandoned in the Atlantic Ocean. Her crew were rescued by Plymouth Rock (United States). Harriet Brewster was on a voyage from New York, United States to Bordeaux, Gironde, France. |
| Hawk | United Kingdom | The schooner departed from Dysart, Fife for Marans, Charente-Inférieure, France, with coal. Not seen since, presumed foundered with the loss of all hands, and posted missing, |
| Mary Ellen | United Kingdom | The schooner ran aground and sank in the Sound of Islay. She was on a voyage from Caernarfon to Burghead, Moray. |

== 22 September ==
List of shipwrecks: 22 September 1879
| Ship | State | Description |
|---|---|---|
| Emmanuel | France | The brigantine ran aground on the Mong, off Egersund, Denmark, and was wrecked with the loss of two of her crew. She was on a voyage from Dunkirk, Nord to Gothenburg, Sweden. |
| John Williams | United Kingdom | The fishing coble capsized in the North Sea off Whitby, Yorkshire. Her crew were rescued by another coble. |
| Nugget | United Kingdom | The Mersey Flat collided with the tug Rover (United Kingdom) and sank in the River Mersey. Her crew were rescued. |
| Orwell | United Kingdom | The London collier collided with Erith and sank in the Lower Hope Reach off Gravesend, Kent. All the crew were landed at Gravesend. |
| Patrie | France | The steamship sprang a leak and was beached south of Peniche, Portugal. She was on a voyage form Gibraltar to Bordeaux, Gironde. |

== 23 September ==
List of shipwrecks: 23 September 1879
| Ship | State | Description |
|---|---|---|
| Anenome | United Kingdom | The steamship ran aground at Hartlepool, County Durham. She was on a voyage from London to Hartlepool. |
| Astarte | United Kingdom | The yawl was driven ashore and wrecked on North Uist, Outer Hebrides. All fourteen people on board survived. |
| Benan | United Kingdom | The steamship collided with Goletta (Flag unknown) and ran ashore on the North Twin Island, County Antrim. |
| De Hoop | Belgium | The barge was run into by the steamship Gamma (United Kingdom) and sank at Antwerp. |
| Durham Packet | (United Kingdom of Great Britain and Ireland) Guernsey | The brig ran aground on the Shoebury Sand, in the Thames Estuary. She was on a voyage from Guernsey to London. She was refloated the next day with assistance from the tug Reliance (United Kingdom), which towed her in to London. |
| Gruachan | United Kingdom | The yacht sank in Oban Bay. |
| Jeannie Blair | United Kingdom | The schooner was driven ashore and wrecked at Kildonan, Isle of Arran. Her crew were rescued. She was on a voyage from Harrington, Cumberland to Irvine, Ayrshire. |
| John and Ann | United Kingdom | The fishing boat collided with the fishing boat Mary (United Kingdom) and sank off Whitby, Yorkshire. Her crew were rescued by Mary. f |
| Linda Flor | United Kingdom | The ship was driven ashore at Littleferry, Sutherland. Her crew were rescued. |
| Marie Zoe | France | The schooner sprang a leak and foundered in the Atlantic Ocean 25 nautical miles (46 km) north north west of Ouessant, Finistère. Her crew survived. She was on a voyage from Bilbao, Spain to Newport, Monmouthshire, United Kingdom. |
| Palm Flower | United Kingdom | The steam yacht was damaged by fire off Start Point, Devon. |
| Sex Brodre | Norway | The brigantine capsized between the Shetland Islands and Lewis, Outer Hebrides, United Kingdom with the loss of three of her six crew. She was on a voyage from Drammen to Belfast, County Antrim. |
| Union T. | United Kingdom | The schooner was driven ashore and wrecked at Newbiggin-by-the-Sea, Northumberland. Her seven crew were rescued by the Newbiggin Lifeboat. She was on a voyage from Calais, France to Warkworth, Northumberland. |

== 24 September ==
List of shipwrecks: 24 September 1879
| Ship | State | Description |
|---|---|---|
| Alpha | United Kingdom | The ship foundered in the Bristol Channel. She was on a voyage from Newport, Monmouthshire to Bristol, Gloucestershire. |
| Lizzie English | United Kingdom | The steamship was driven ashore at the Garipol Lighthouse, "Karabournou", Ottoman Empire with the loss of five of her crew. There were at least nine survivors. She was on a voyage from Galaţi, United Principalities to Livorno, Italy. She subsequently became a wreck. |
| Nef | Norway | The barque was wrecked on the Longsand, in the North Sea off the coast of Essex, United Kingdom. Her ten crew were rescued by the Harwich Lifeboat Springwell ( Royal National Lifeboat Institution). Nef was on a voyage from Flensburg, Germany to New York, United States. |
| Primitive | United Kingdom | The Mousehole smack sank off Scarborough, Yorkshire, after a collision with the Newcastle steamer Talisman which was bound for Rotterdam. All the crew were landed at Scarborough. |
| Sumatra | United Kingdom | The ship ran aground at Bombay, India. She was on a voyage from Livorno, Italy to Bombay. She was refloated. |
| Woodruff Sims | United States | The lumber schooner sprung a leak in a violent gale and was abandoned by her crew. She drifted ashore the next day one mile (1.6 km) south of Life Saving Station No. 2, 6th District on the coast of Virginia, a total loss. Her crew was rescued by a passing vessel. |

== 25 September ==
List of shipwrecks: 25 September 1879
| Ship | State | Description |
|---|---|---|
| De Ruyter | Belgium | The steamship was driven ashore at Hoedekenskerke, Zeeland, Netherlands. She was on a voyage from New York, United States to Antwerp. |
| Lady Lawrence | United Kingdom | The full-rigged ship ran aground in the Hooghly River. She was on a voyage from Calcutta, India to New York. She was refloated and resumed her voyage. |
| Martha Brockelmann | Germany | The ship ran aground and was wrecked in the Yangtze at Shanghai, China. Her crew were rescued. She was later refloated with assistance. |
| Palestine | United Kingdom | The brig ran aground near Fredrikstad, Denmark. She was later refloated and taken in to Fredrikstad. |
| Princess | Canada | The schooner was driven ashore east of Marbella, Spain. She was on a voyage from Gioia Tauro, Italy to Goole, Yorkshire. She was refloated. |

== 26 September ==
List of shipwrecks: 26 September 1879
| Ship | State | Description |
|---|---|---|
| Humildade | Portugal | The schooner was driven ashore and wrecked on Flores Island, Azores. |
| Racer | United Kingdom | The fishing lugger was run down and sank in the North Sea off the North Foreland, Kent by the steamship Pleiades (United Kingdom) with the loss of a crew member . Survivors were rescued by a lugger. |

== 27 September ==
List of shipwrecks: 27 September 1879
| Ship | State | Description |
|---|---|---|
| Erato | United Kingdom | The ship ran aground on the Black Rocks, off the Tusker Rock. She was on a voyage from Samarang, Java, Netherlands East Indies to Greenock, Renfrewshire. She was refloated and put in to Holyhead, Anglesey in a leaky condition. |
| Langdale | United Kingdom | The ship was driven ashore and wrecked near Carnsore Point, County Wexford with the loss of eight of the 31 people on board. She was on a voyage from San Francisco, California, United States to Liverpool, Lancashire. |
| Lizzie Burrill | United Kingdom | The ship ran aground between the Twin Islands, County Antrim. She was refloated and taken in to Belfast, County Antrim. |
| Tita | Italy | The ship was driven ashore at "Fos", Algeria. She was on a voyage from Bône, Algeria to Elba. |

== 28 September ==
List of shipwrecks: 28 September 1879
| Ship | State | Description |
|---|---|---|
| Anna Clara | Brazil | The steamship suffered a boiler explosion while entering the bar at Santa Cruz. She caught fire and sank with the loss of two crew and a passenger. Most of the cargo and the mail was saved. |
| Emmanuel | France | The brigantine stranded on the Sokendal coast, to the north of the Haadyr look-out station, Norway, and sank almost immediately with the loss of one of her six crew. She was on a voyage from Dunkirk, Nord to Gothenburg, Sweden. |
| Richard, and Peter Graham | United Kingdom | The steamship Peter Graham ran into the Thames barge Richard was beached in the River Thames at Blackwall, Middlesex. Richard was severely damaged. |
| Victoria | United Kingdom | The barque was destroyed by fire at Demerara, British Guiana. |

== 29 September ==
List of shipwrecks: 29 September 1879
| Ship | State | Description |
|---|---|---|
| Alfonso | United Kingdom | The steamship was driven ashore on Sprogø, Denmark. She was on a voyage from Middlesbrough, Yorkshire to Flensburg, Germany. She was refloated and taken in to Korsør, Denmark. |
| Barao de San Diego | Brazil | The steamship sprang a leak in The Downs nand was beached at Margate, Kent, United Kingdom. She was on a voyage from London, United Kingdom to Rio de Janeiro. It was found that a valve had been left open. Barao de San Diego was refloated and taken into The Downs. |
| Helen | United Kingdom | The ship ran aground at Saint-Valery-sur-Somme, Somme, France. She was on a voyage from Saint-Valery-sur-Somme to Newcastle upon Tyne, Northumberland, She was refloated and put back to Saint-Valery-sur-Somme. |
| Iona | United Kingdom | The ship was driven ashore at Spittal Point, Northumberland. She was on a voyage from New York, United States to Berwick upon Tweed, Northumberland. She was refloated the next day and taken in to Berwick upon Tweed. |
| Richard Roper | United Kingdom | The schooner was wrecked in the Small Isles. |

== 30 September ==
List of shipwrecks: 30 September 1879
| Ship | State | Description |
|---|---|---|
| Carnarvon | United Kingdom | The schooner sank off Maryport, Cumberland. Both crew survived. She was on a voyage from Silloth, Cumberland to Dundalk, County Louth. It was alleged that she had been deliberately scuttled. |
| Crown | United Kingdom | The steamship ran aground at Maassluis, South Holland, Netherlands. She was refloated with assistance and resumed her voyage. |
| Despatch | United Kingdom | The Mersey Flat was holed by her anchor and sank in the River Mersey. She was later refloated. |
| Eirene | United Kingdom | The steamship was wrecked on the Seal Rocks, in the Strait of Belle Isle. She was on a voyage from Montreal, Quebec, Canada to Glasgow, Renfrewshire. |
| Gävle | Sweden | The tug ran aground on the Eggerstan Reef, off Gävle. She was refloated on 2 October but consequently sank. |
| Joseph Pease | United Kingdom | The steamship departed from New York, United States for a British port. No further trace, reported missing. |
| Landseer | United Kingdom | The ship ran aground in the River Liffey. She was on a voyage from San Francisco, California, United States to Dublin. She was refloated and taken in to Dublin. |
| Metta Katrine | Denmark | The ship ran aground at Hirsholmene. She was on a voyage from Newcastle upon Tyne, Northumberland, United Kingdom to Karrebæksminde. |
| Riga | United Kingdom | The steamship put in to Lisbon, Portugal on fire. She was on a voyage from Newcastle upon Tyne to Greece. She was scuttled. |
| Unknown (Wayzata Bay Wreck) | United States | The wooden model barge sank in Wayzata Bay on Lake Minnetonka during a storm. No crew were lost. She was used to haul cordwood and lumber from the shores of Lake Minnetonka to rail terminals. |
| Wepre Lass | United Kingdom | The schooner sprang a leak and sank in the Irish Sea 5 nautical miles (9.3 km) west north west of Maryport, Cumberland. Both crew were rescued. She was on a voyage from Silloth, Cumberland to Dundalk, County Louth. |
| Unnamed | Germany | The lighter exploded in the Elbe near Hamburg with the loss of several lives. |

== Unknown date ==
List of shipwrecks: Unknown date in September 1879
| Ship | State | Description |
|---|---|---|
| Annie Ainslie | United Kingdom | The steamship was driven ashore near Sundsvall, Sweden. She was on a voyage from Sundsvall to Saint-Nazaire, Loire-Inférieure, France. She was later refloated with the assistance of tugs and taken in to Sundsvall. |
| Antelope | United Kingdom | The ship was driven ashore on the Swedish coast. She was refloated and taken in to Helsingør, Denmark in a leaky condition. |
| Antwerp | Belgium | The ship ran aground at New York, United States. She was on a voyage from New York to Antwerp. |
| Barbary | United Kingdom | The steamship ran aground on the wreck of the steamship Australia (United Kingdom) on the Vada Shoal, off Livorno, Italy. She was on a voyage from Livorno to Galaţi, United Principalities. She was refloated and put back to Livorno for repairs. |
| B. Gerolama Olivari | Italy | The barque was driven ashore at Waterford, United Kingdom. |
| Blanche | France | The schooner ran aground off Saint-Valery-sur-Somme, Somme. |
| Capella | Norway | The ship ran aground in the River Avon under the Clifton Suspension Bridge. She was on a voyage from Onega, Russia to Bristol, Gloucestershire, United Kingdom. She was run into on 10 September by the steamship Preußischer Adler (Germany). She was later refloated and taken in to Bristol. |
| Carl | Denmark | The schooner was discovered in a waterlogged condition by the steamship Hjalmar (Sweden). She was towed in to Stockholm. |
| Cito | Norway | The brig ran aground on Amager, Denmark. She was on a voyage from Kronstadt, Russia to Leith, Lothian, She was refloated and taken in to Copenhagen, Denmark. |
| Cyprus | United Kingdom | The steam yacht struck rocks at Bembridge, Isle of Wight and was damaged. |
| Deborah | United Kingdom | The schooner ran aground on the Sunderland Bank, in the Irish Sea off the coast of Lancashire. She was on a voyage from Hamburg, Germany to Lancaster, Lancashire. She was refloated with assistance and taken in to Lancaster in a leaky condition. |
| De Jonge Anna | Netherlands | The fishing boat was discovered abandoned off Scheveningen, South Holland by the steamship Atalanta (Sweden), which towed her in to Antwerp. |
| De Ruyter | United Kingdom | The steamship was driven ashore in the Scheldt at Antwerp. |
| Edward Cardwell | United Kingdom | The ship ran aground at Quebec City, Canada. She was on a voyage from Quebec City to Liverpool, Lancashire. She was refloated. |
| Edward Dennison | United Kingdom | The smack foundered in the North Sea. Her crew were rescued by the smack Perseverance (United Kingdom). |
| Eleanor and Jane | United Kingdom | The ship ran aground on the Cork Sand, in the North Sea off the coast of Essex. She was refloated and taken in to Harwich, Essex. |
| Emma L. Partridge | United Kingdom | The ship was wrecked on the Silver Key. She was on a voyage from Liverpool to Matanzas, Cuba. |
| Ennerdale | United Kingdom | The ship was destroyed by fire off "Cape Mess". |
| Fastnet | United Kingdom | The steamship ran aground in the River Lee at Rushbrooke, County Cork. She was on a voyage from Middlesbrough, Yorkshire to Belfast, County Antrim. She was refloated and taken in to Cork. |
| Fifeshire | United Kingdom | The steamship ran aground in the Danube and was damaged. She was refloated. |
| Frigga | Norway | The brig ran aground on Saltholm, Denmark. She was on a voyage from Haparanda, Sweden to a Dutch port. She was refloated and put in to Copenhagen. |
| Gamma | Germany | The ship was driven ashore near Farsund, Norway. |
| Giovannina | Austria-Hungary | The schooner was run into by the steamship Harold (United Kingdom) and was beached. |
| Gleneur | United Kingdom | The ship was run into by another vessel and sank. Five of her crew were rescued by M. A. Evans (United Kingdom). |
| Gomer | United Kingdom | The smack sprang a leak and foundered off Great Orme Head, Caernarfonshire on 2 or 9 September. Her crew survived. She was on a voyage from Liverpool to "Llandebrog". |
| Helen | United States | The ship was driven ashore at Boston, Massachusetts. She was on a voyage from East Caicos, Caicos Islands to Boston. She was condemned. |
| Hephzibah | Germany | The schooner ran aground on the Krantzand, in the North Sea off the German coast. |
| Jane Wright | United Kingdom | The barquentine was driven ashore and wrecked at Cape Wolf, Prince Edward Island, Canada. She was on a voyage from Richibucto, New Brunswick, Canada to Barrow-in-Furness, Lancashire. She was later refloated and taken in to Pictou, Nova Scotia, where she arrived on 25 September in a waterlogged condition. She was placed under repair. |
| Jilt | United Kingdom | The schooner was driven ashore at Cabo de Santa Maria, Portugal. She was refloated. |
| Jutland | United Kingdom | The steamship ran aground on the Spijkerplaat. She was on a voyage from Ghent, West Flanders, Belgium to London. |
| Kielder Castle | United Kingdom | The steamship ran aground at "Swalferort". She was on a voyage from Riga, Russia to London. She was refloated. |
| Lochleven Castle | United Kingdom | The barque was abandoned in the Pacific Ocean before 5 September. Her crew were rescued by Belle (United Kingdom). Lochleven Castle was on a voyage from Liverpool to Callao and/or Lima, Peru. |
| Loudoun Castle | United Kingdom | The steamship was driven ashore at Shanghai, China. She was later refloated. |
| Louise Poll | Germany | The ship was wrecked at the mouth of the Goatzacoalcos River, Mexico. |
| Maggie | Germany | The schooner ran aground on the Krantzand. |
| Marts | Norway | The schooner collided with the steamship Skaane (Sweden) and sank. Her crew were rescued by Skaane. Marts was on a voyage from Haugesund to Stettin, Germany. |
| Medby Elsie | Denmark | The schooner was driven ashore on Rödskär, Sweden. She was on a voyage from Saint Petersburg, Russia to Helsingør. She was a total loss. |
| Norbjerg | (Russian Empire) Grand Duchy of Finland | The ship ran aground at Rønne, Denmark. She was refloated and towed in to Stockholm, Sweden for repairs. |
| Nuova | Italy | The ship collided with Mary (United Kingdom) off Breaksea Point, Glamorgan, United Kingdom and was abandoned by her crew. She was subsequently towed in to Newport, Monmouthshire, United Kingdom by the tug Hazard (United Kingdom). |
| Oscar | Sweden | The brig was abandoned at sea. Her crew were rescued. |
| Patriot | United Kingdom | The barque ran aground at Arkhangelsk, Russia. |
| Philosopher | United Kingdom | The East Indiaman was wrecked at "Poore-ta-Enta" on 6 or 26 September with the loss of twelve of her 27 crew. She was on a voyage from Calcutta, India to Boston, Massachusetts. |
| Primrose | United Kingdom | The ship was driven ashore and wrecked at Skerrigan Point, County Antrim. |
| Protector | United Kingdom | The brig ran aground on Saltholm. |
| Riga | United Kingdom | The steamship put in to Lisbon, Portugal on fire. She was on a voyage from Newcastle upon Tyne, Northumberland to a Greek port. She was scuttled on 2 October. |
| Roman Empress | United Kingdom | The brig sank. Her crew were rescued by Kinnaird (United Kingdom). Roman Empress was on a voyage from Sunderland, County Durham to Neufahrwasser, Germany. |
| Salah | Norway | The schooner sprang a leak in the North Sea. Her crew survived. She was on a voyage from Belfast to Aarhus. |
| Stanley | Norway | The barque was driven ashore at Cape Hatteras, North Carolina, United States. Her crew were rescued. She was on a voyage from Honfleur, Manche, France to Baltimore, Maryland, United States. |
| Subahana | United Kingdom | The schooner was driven ashore and wrecked near Anjer, Netherlands East Indies. |
| Sveridge | Sweden | The steamship ran aground and sank at "Moldeon", Norway. She was on a voyage from Kristiansund, Norway to Portugal. |
| Svula | Norway | The brig ran aground at the Rönnskär Lighthouse, Grand Duchy of Finland. She was refloated and taken in to Helsinki. |
| Sylphiden | Germany | The ship ran aground on Saltholmen, Denmark. She was on a voyage from Liverpool to Memel. She was refloated with assistance. |
| Telephone | United Kingdom | The schooner ran aground on the Scheelhoek, off the coast of Zeeland, Netherlands. She was on a voyage from an English port to Dordrecht, South Holland. |
| Vaillant | France | The lugger foundered in the North Sea off the Dutch coast. Her crew were rescued by the smack Mizpah (United Kingdom). Vaillant was on avoyage from Paimpol, Côtes-du-Nord to Pori, Grand Duchy of Finland. |
| 1354 | Russia | The lighter ran aground and sank at Kronstadt. |
| Unnamed | Flag unknown | The schooner collided with the steamship Puerto Rico (Spain) and sank off Baltimore with the loss of all hands. |
