= Porkkala Lighthouse =

Lighthouse in Kirkkonummi, Finland

Porkkala (Kallbåda) Lighthouse
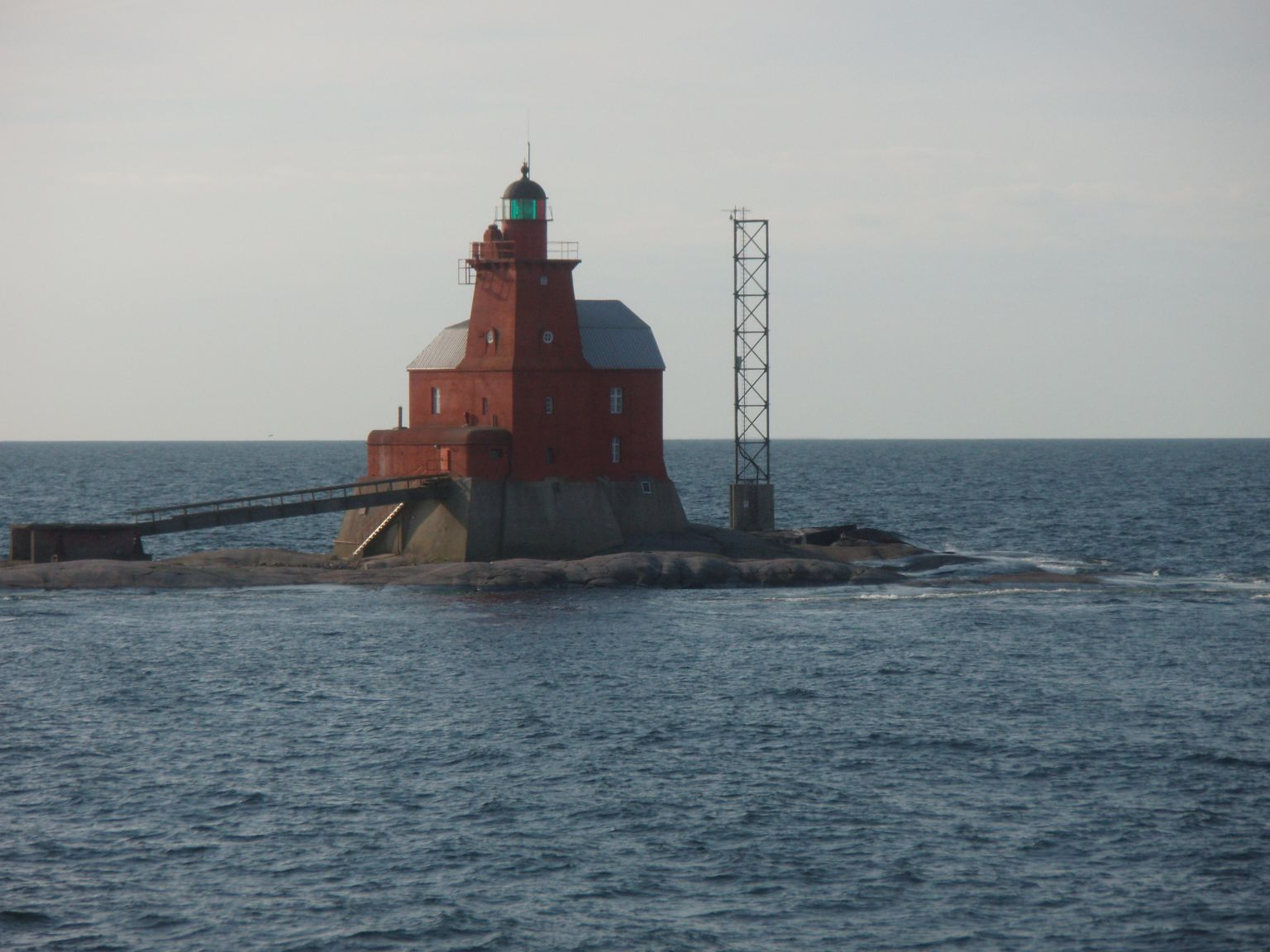
- Porkkala Kallbåda in 2009
- Location: Gulf of Finland, Baltic Sea
- Coordinates: 59.86894°N 24.30272°E

Tower
- Constructed: 1920
- Markings: red
- Heritage: Cultural Heritage Site of National Significance

Light
- Focal height: 26.1 m (86 ft)
- Range: 12 nmi (22 km; 14 mi)
- Characteristic: Fl(3) WRG 20s

Porkkala Lighthouse (Finnish: Porkkalan majakka, Swedish: Porkala fyr), also known as Kallbåda or Porkkala Kallbåda, is a lighthouse located in the municipality of Kirkkonummi, Finland, approximately 9 kilometres (4.9 nmi) from the southern tip of the Porkkalanniemi peninsula, in the western part of the Gulf of Finland.

The lighthouse was built in 1920, to replace the earlier Porkkala-Rönnskär one.

Porkkala-Kallbåda was the last lighthouse in Finland to be intended for manual operation by lighthouse-keepers. For this reason, and due to the small area of the skerry it is built on, the lighthouse design incorporates integral accommodation and service facilities for two operators and their families, similar to those found in the Bengtskär Lighthouse.

It is built on massive reinforced concrete foundation, and constructed of red brick.

After the Continuation War, the Porkkalanniemi area was placed under the control of the Soviet Union. When the area was returned to Finland in 1955, the Porkkala-Kallbåda lighthouse was found to be in such state of disrepair as to be uninhabitable, and it was instead automated and operated remotely from Harmaja in Helsinki. The lighthouse building is now leased to the Finnish mountaineer Veikka Gustafsson.

The Porkkala Lighthouses form part of a milieu designated and protected by the Finnish Heritage Agency as a nationally important built cultural environment (Valtakunnallisesti merkittävä rakennettu kulttuuriympäristö).

The area is also protected as a grey seal nature reserve, for which reason the general public are not allowed to disembark onto the skerry.
