= Rönnskär Lighthouse =

Lighthouse in Kirkkonummi, Finland

Rönnskär lighthouse Rönnskär
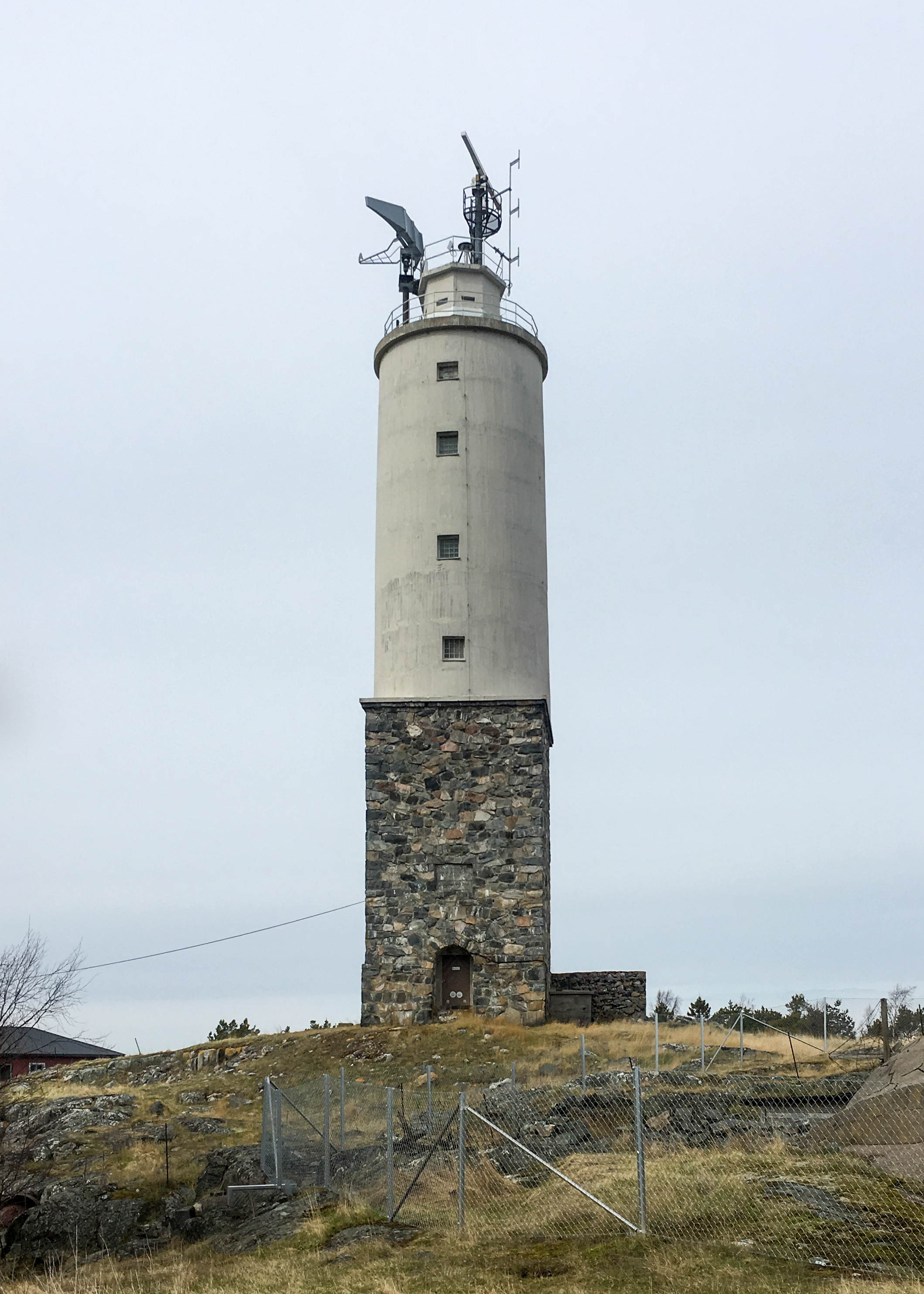
- Rönnskär Lighthouse in 2018
- Location: Rönnskär, Kirkkonummi, Finland
- Coordinates: 59°56′08″N 24°23′29″E

Tower
- Constructed: 1800
- Construction: natural stone, brick
- Height: 27 m (89 ft), 15 m (49 ft)

Light
- First lit: 1800
- Deactivated: 1928
- Characteristic: Exting (1928–)

Rönnskär Lighthouse (Finnish: Rönnskärin majakka, Swedish: Rönnskär fyr) is a decommissioned lighthouse located c. 9 kilometres (4.9 nmi) south of the Porkkalanniemi peninsula in the western section of the Gulf of Finland.

Completed in 1800 while Finland was still part of Sweden, on the orders of King Gustaf IV Adolf, Rönnskär is one of the oldest extant lighthouses in Finland. It was, however, decommissioned in 1928, following the completion on the nearby islet of Kallbåda of the Porkkala Lighthouse (that is, Porkkala Kallbåda, as opposed to Porkkala Rönnskär, as this one is sometimes called).

Since its decommissioning, Rönnskär has been used mostly as a communications and VTS radar and monitoring facility by the Finnish Navy and Coast Guard. The island is designated as military zone which is why there is no public access to the lighthouse.

The construction consists of a square granite base, topped by a round brick tower; the base is natural stone colour (grey), the main tower section painted white.

The Rönnskär Lighthouse is part of a milieu designated and protected by the Finnish Heritage Agency as a nationally important built cultural environment (Valtakunnallisesti merkittävä rakennettu kulttuuriympäristö).
