= Degerby =

Degerby Degerby kommun
- Former Finnish municipality
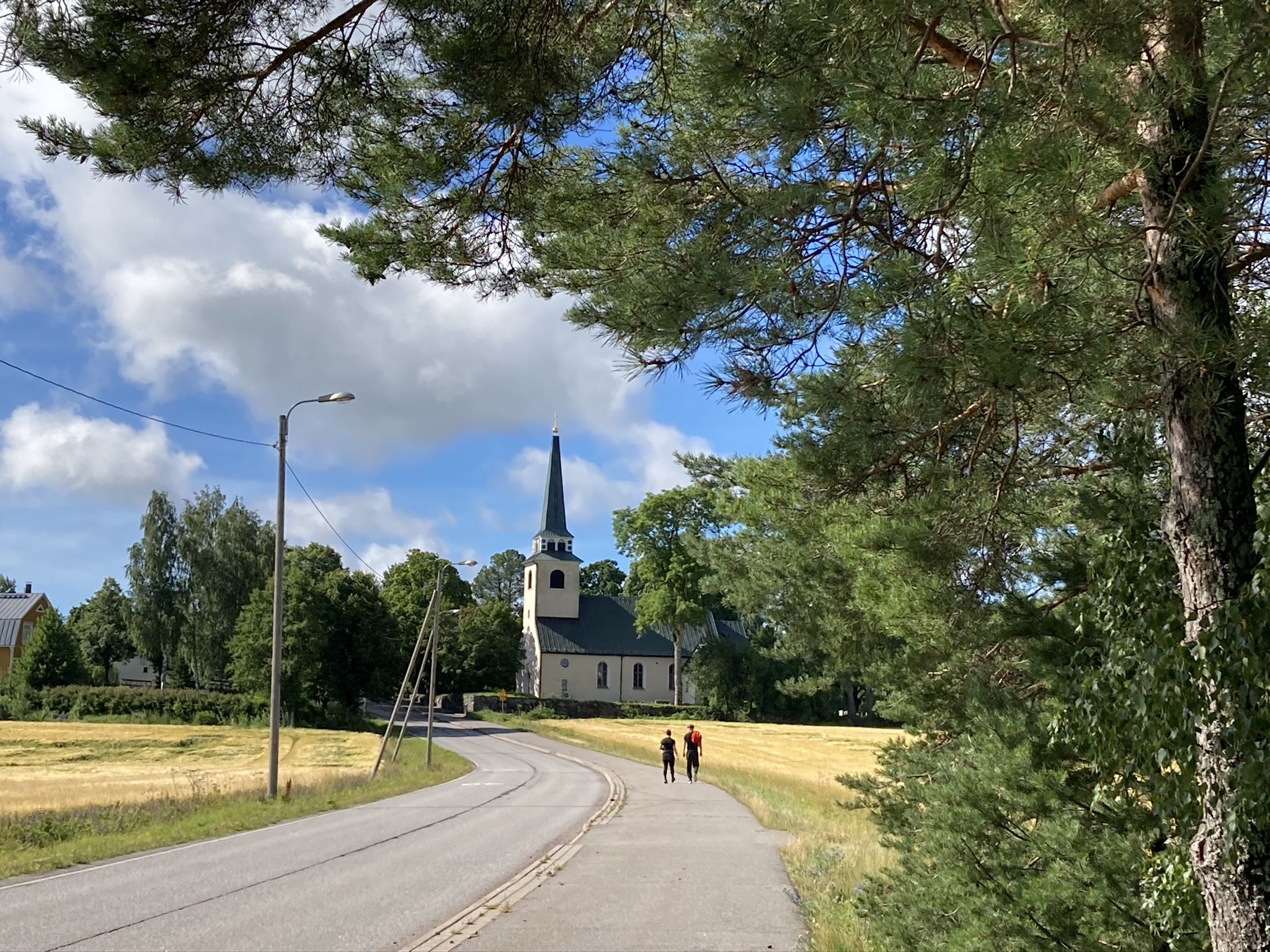
- The church village of Degerby. The church building from 1932 in the background.

- Location of Degerby in Uusimaa region
- Coordinates: 60°5′7″N 24°10′40″W
- Region: Uusimaa
- Sub-region: Raseborg sub-region
- Founded: 1867
- Ceased to exist: 31.12. 1945
- Seat: Degerby Town Hall

Government
  - Body: Municipal Council
  - First chair of municipal council: Gustaf Adolf Lindroth

Area
  - Total: 82.4 km^{2} (31.8 sq mi)

Population (1940)
  - Total: 1 493
- Time zone: UTC+02:00 (EET)
  - Summer (DST): UTC+03:00
- Postal code: 10161

Degerby is a former Finnish municipality located in Uusimaa region in Finland. Degerby was founded in 1867 after it gained its independence from the municipality of Ingå. The municipality ceased to exist in 1945 after major part of it became a part of the Soviet naval base Porkkala.

In 1940 there were 1 490 people living in Degerby with majority of people speaking Swedish as their mother tongue. The church village of Degerby, which was also the administrative centre of the municipality, is listed as a Built cultural heritage site of national significance by the Finnish Heritage Agency.

The neighbouring municipalities of Degerby were Siuntio and Ingå. Nowadays Degerby is part of the municipality of Ingå.

== History ==
The area of Degerby was populated during the Middle Ages when the King's Road passed through the village. In 1560s there were only four houses in Degerby. There are also Bronze Age burial sites on the cliffs that surround the Degerby church village.

=== As an independent municipality ===
Degerby gained its independence from Ingå in 1867. Ecclesiastically Degerby was still under Ingå's rule and the parish was run by chaplain from Ingå. Degerby parish gained its independence from Ingå in 1923.

The municipality had seven schools, a town hall, a library, a midwife, a nurse, a fire inspector, a post office and a church all located in the administrative centre in the church village. Degerby also had a railway station in Solberg village which was the second largest village in the municipality. Mail and goods were transported to and from Degerby via the Solberg railway station.

=== The Soviet Naval Base Porkkala ===
In 1944 Porkkala area was leased to Soviet Union for 50 years as a consequence of the demands of the armistice. Majority of Degerby's area was included in the lease of Porkkala and altogether over 1 200 inhabitants of the total of about 1 400 inhabitants of Degerby were evacuated in 1944. As from 1 January 1946 the remaining parts of the Degerby were joined with Ingå and the Degerby municipality ceased to exist.

The parish of Degerby was joined with the parish of Ingå in the beginning of 1950.

As the municipality was disestablished before rural municipalities were allowed to have coats of arms, Degerby never had one. The heraldist Tapani Talari has designed an unofficial coat of arms for Degerby, which is now used by the village's council.

== Demographics ==
=== Population ===
Development of Degerby's population in 1880–1940
Year	Population
1880	1 279
1890	1 442
1900	1 524
1910	1 581
1920	1 464
1930	1 431
1940	1 493
Source: Statistics Finland

== Geography ==
Degerby is located in the middle of large fields surrounded by rocky hills.

=== Villages ===
Degerby church village, Degerö, Flyt, Kopparnäs, Solberg, Strand, Västersolberg

=== Traffic ===
The Finnish national road 51 goes through Degerby south of the church village. There is a railway station in Solberg but no active traffic is maintained nowadays. Torbacka airport for small aircraft is also located in Degerby.

== Sights ==
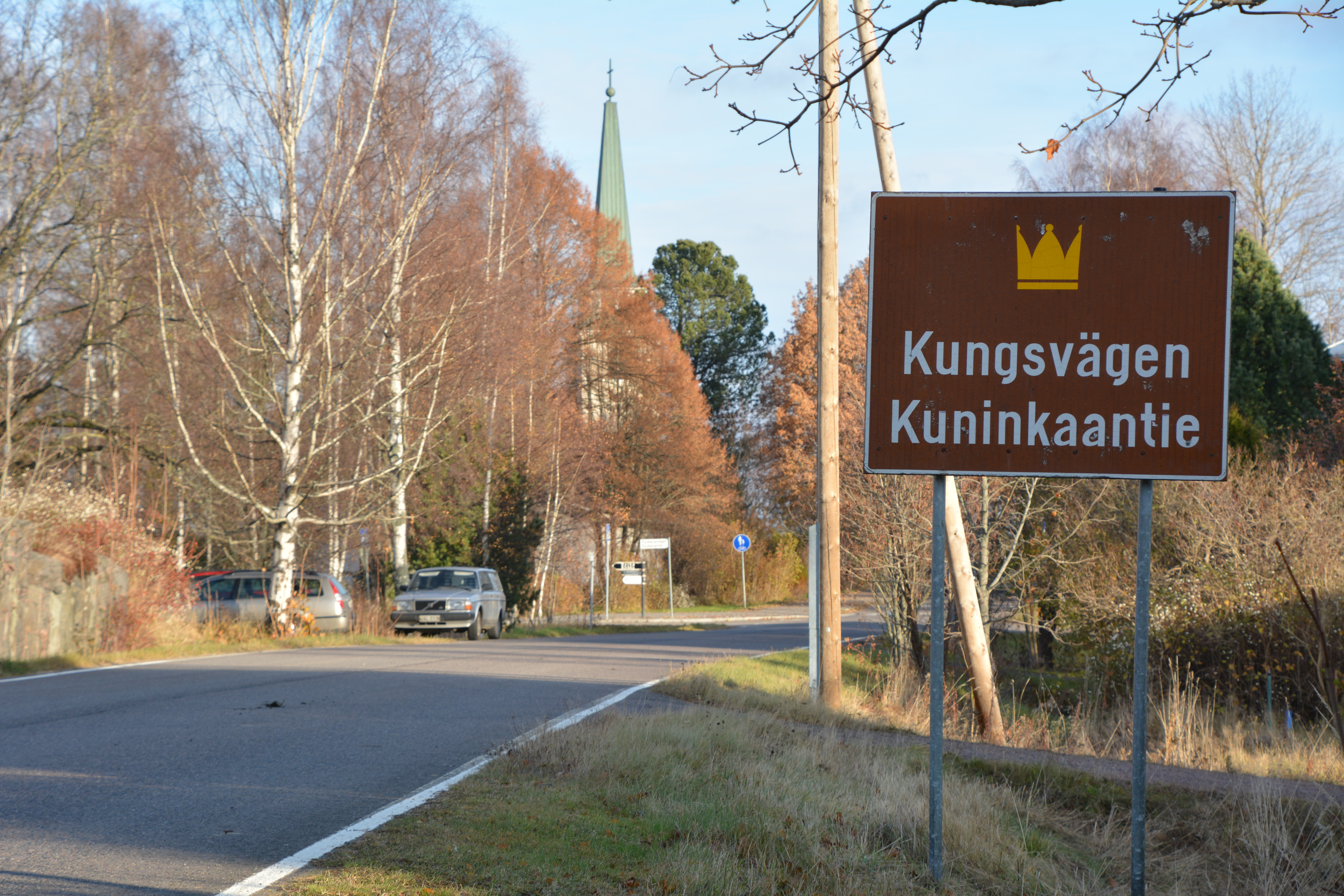
The King's Road in Degerby

List of sights in Degerby:

- Degerby Church
- Degerby Igor museum
- Soviet bunker of Grefvas
- Gutsåker cemetery
- Torbacka airport
- Kopparnäs open air nature area
- Lomamäen lemmikkipuisto domestic animal park

== See also ==
- Ingå
- Uusimaa
- Siuntio
