= Ingå =

Ingå Ingå – Inkoo
- Municipality
- Ingå kommun Inkoon kunta
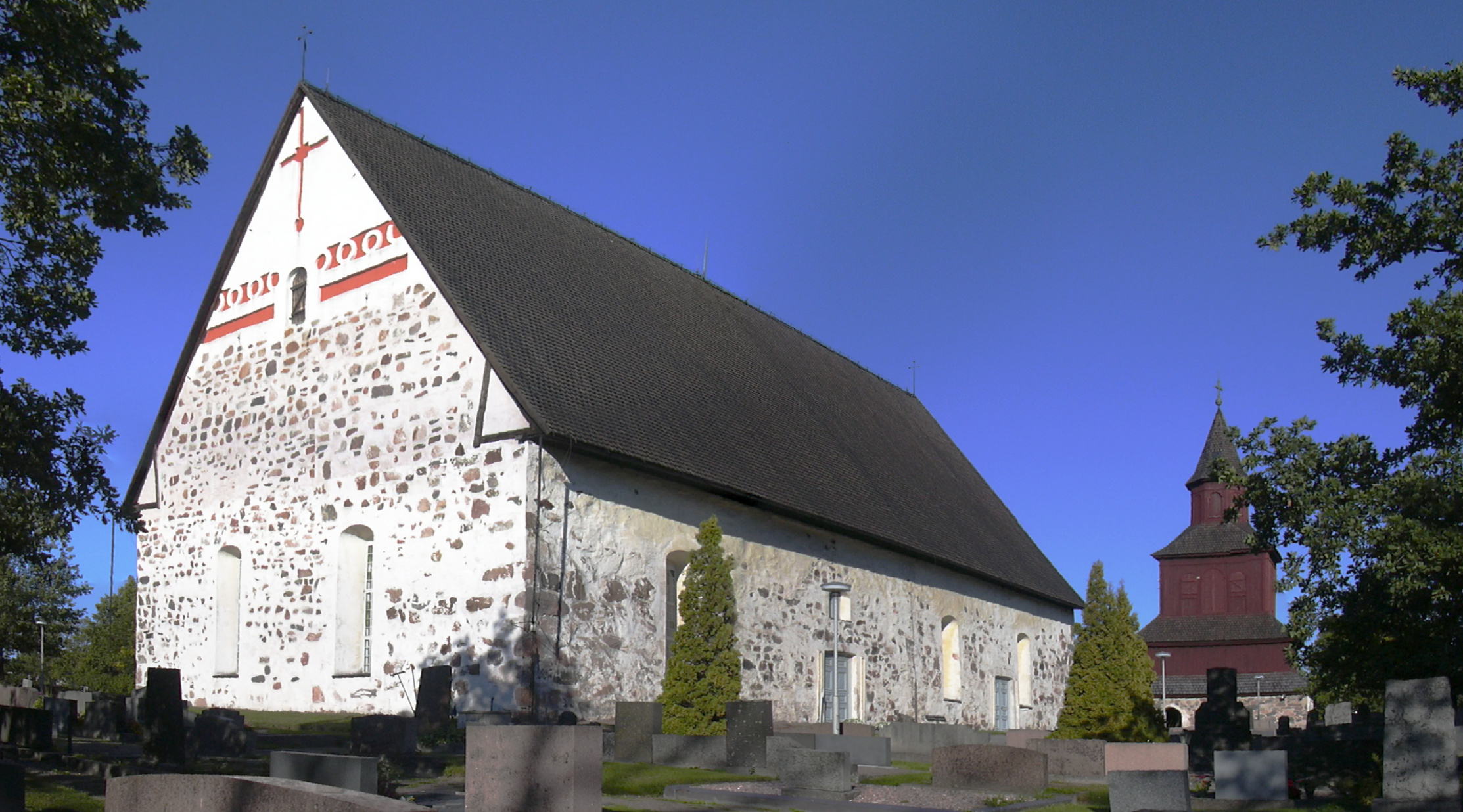
- Ingå Church

- Coat of arms

- Location of Ingå in Finland
- Interactive map of Ingå
- Coordinates: 60°02′44″N 24°00′17″E
- Country: Finland
- Region: Uusimaa
- Sub-region: Raseborg
- First documents: 1335

Government
  - Municipal manager: Erik Lund

Area (2018-01-01)
  - Total: 954.02 km^{2} (368.35 sq mi)
  - Land: 350.85 km^{2} (135.46 sq mi)
  - Water: 604.21 km^{2} (233.29 sq mi)
  - Rank: 220th largest in Finland

Population (2025-12-31)
  - Total: 5,391
  - Rank: 161st largest in Finland
  - Density: 15.37/km^{2} (39.8/sq mi)

Population by native language
  - Swedish: 50.8% (official)
  - Finnish: 43.9% (official)
  - Others: 5.3%

Population by age
  - 0 to 14: 15.1%
  - 15 to 64: 59.2%
  - 65 or older: 25.8%
- Time zone: UTC+02:00 (EET)
  - Summer (DST): UTC+03:00 (EEST)
- Climate: Dfb
- Website: www.inga.fi

Ingå (Swedish pronunciation: [ˈiŋːo]; Finnish: Inkoo, Finnish: [ˈiŋkoː]) is a municipality in Finland, located in the southern coast of the country. Ingå is situated in the western part of the Uusimaa region. The population of Ingå is approximately 5,000, while the sub-region has a population of approximately 40,000. It is the 161st most populous municipality in Finland.

Ingå is located 37 kilometres (23 mi) east of Ekenäs, the town centre of Raseborg and 50 kilometres (31 mi) west of Helsinki. Ingå covers an area of 954.02 square kilometres (368.35 sq mi) of which 604.21 km^{2} (233.29 sq mi) is water. The population density is 15.37 inhabitants per square kilometre (39.8/sq mi).

Ingå is a bilingual municipality with Finnish and Swedish as its official languages. The population consists of 44% Finnish speakers, 51% Swedish speakers, and 5% speakers of other languages.

Finnish national road 51 goes right through the southern part of Ingå. The centre consists mainly of the road Bollstavägen that cuts through the Ingå centrum. Along the road are most of the major buildings and shops of the small municipality. A few grocery stores, small kiosk, library and a bar. Towards the Road 51 there is the residential area. Near road 51, at the northern tip of the residential area is the Ingå Volunteer Rescue Company. Nearby villages include Kusans.

== Politics ==
Results of the 2011 Finnish parliamentary election in Ingå:

- Swedish People's Party 41.5%
- National Coalition Party 20.3%
- Social Democratic Party 16.8%
- Finns Party 9.0%
- Green League 5.4%
- Left Alliance 2.4%
- Centre Party 1.8%
- Christian Democrats 1.5%

== Climate ==
Ingå has an ocean-influenced humid continental climate (Köppen: Dfb).

Climate data for Inkoo Bågaskär (1991–2020 normals, extremes 1962–present)
Month	Jan	Feb	Mar	Apr	May	Jun	Jul	Aug	Sep	Oct	Nov	Dec	Year
Record high °C (°F)	7.4 (45.3)	8.6 (47.5)	12.9 (55.2)	19.8 (67.6)	27.4 (81.3)	30.1 (86.2)	30.6 (87.1)	28.3 (82.9)	22.6 (72.7)	17.5 (63.5)	13.6 (56.5)	9.4 (48.9)	30.6 (87.1)
Mean daily maximum °C (°F)	−0.4 (31.3)	−1.3 (29.7)	1.5 (34.7)	6.2 (43.2)	12.3 (54.1)	17.2 (63.0)	20.7 (69.3)	19.9 (67.8)	15.3 (59.5)	9.2 (48.6)	4.7 (40.5)	1.8 (35.2)	8.9 (48.0)
Daily mean °C (°F)	−2.5 (27.5)	−3.6 (25.5)	−1.2 (29.8)	3.1 (37.6)	8.8 (47.8)	13.7 (56.7)	17.3 (63.1)	16.9 (62.4)	12.7 (54.9)	7.3 (45.1)	3.0 (37.4)	0.0 (32.0)	6.3 (43.3)
Mean daily minimum °C (°F)	−4.6 (23.7)	−5.8 (21.6)	−3.6 (25.5)	0.8 (33.4)	6.1 (43.0)	11.0 (51.8)	14.7 (58.5)	14.4 (57.9)	10.6 (51.1)	5.5 (41.9)	1.4 (34.5)	−1.9 (28.6)	4.1 (39.4)
Record low °C (°F)	−35.4 (−31.7)	−31.6 (−24.9)	−22.6 (−8.7)	−15.4 (4.3)	−2.0 (28.4)	2.4 (36.3)	7.2 (45.0)	5.3 (41.5)	−1.1 (30.0)	−9.4 (15.1)	−15.7 (3.7)	−29.4 (−20.9)	−35.4 (−31.7)
Average relative humidity (%)	89	88	84	81	77	79	80	81	82	85	88	88	84
Source 1: FMI normals 1991-2020
Source 2: Record highs and lows

== See also ==
- Degerby
- Karis
- Siuntio
- Helsinki metropolitan area
- Inkoo virus (INKV) subtype of California encephalitis orthobunyavirus is named after the Finnish name for the area
