= Somalis in Finland =

Somalit Suomessa

Total population
- 15,362 born in Somalia; 28,167 Somali speakers (2025)

Regions with significant populations
- Helsinki, Turku and Tampere regions & Oulu and Vaasa

Languages
- Somali · Arabic · Finnish · Swedish

Religion
- Islam

Somalis in Finland (Finnish: Suomen somalit) are people who originate from Somalia and who live in Finland. People can be born in Somalia, have Somali ancestry and/or be citizens of Somalia. As of 2025, there were 15,362 people born in Somalia living in Finland. Similarly, the number of people with Somali citizenship was 6,934. The number of people who spoke Somali as their mother tongue was 28,167. Somalis are the fourth most common foreign country of origin and the largest group from Africa in Finland.

== Overview ==
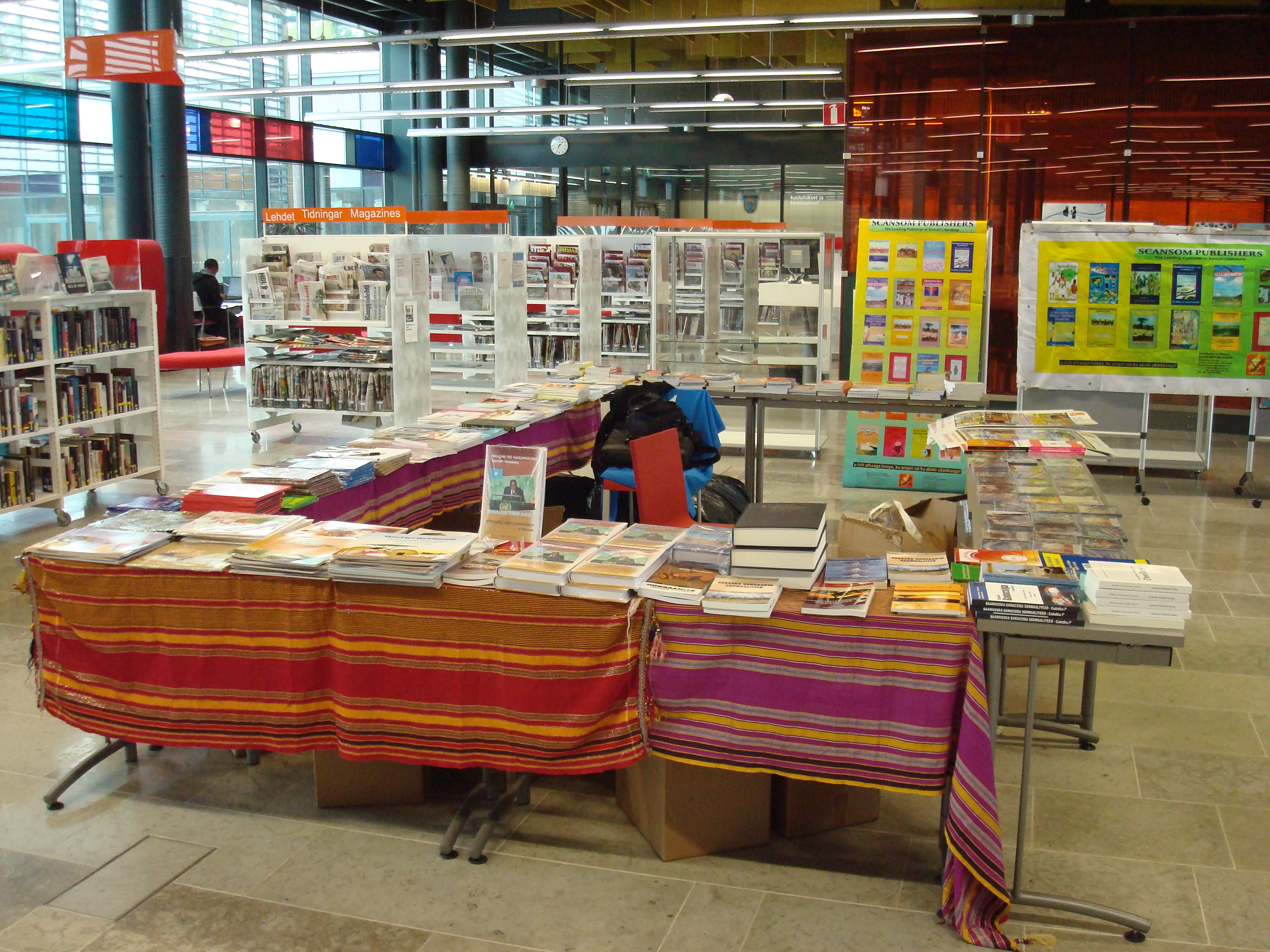
Books on display at the 2012 Somali Culture Fair in Helsinki.

The first Somali immigrants came to Finland in the late 1980s and early 1990s. In 1990, 44 Somali students studying in the Soviet Union immigrated to Finland. Between 1990 and 1995, the number of Somalia citizens in Finland increased from 44 to 4,044. The first arrivals were university students from Soviet universities in the former Soviet Union (see Zahra Abdulla). Later, more asylum seekers arrived directly from Somalia, many through a program of family unification.

In 2010, it was estimated by the Finnish immigration service (Migri) that a majority of all Somali refugees arriving in Finland were illiterate due to the Somali Civil War having destroyed the opportunities for those born after the 70s to attend the school system.

A 2012 Finnish Institute for Health and Welfare (THL) survey of Somalia-born immigrants in Finland found that, prior to their arrival, around 50% of males and 50% of females had attended primary school (Peruskoulu), 39% of males and 17% of females had attended high school (Lukio), and 11% of males and 33% of females had not attended school (Ei lainkaan). According to Statistics Finland, in 2012, 77.9% of Somalia-born immigrants in Finland had attained a lower secondary or unknown education level, 17.9% had attained an upper secondary education level, and 4.2% had attained a tertiary education level.

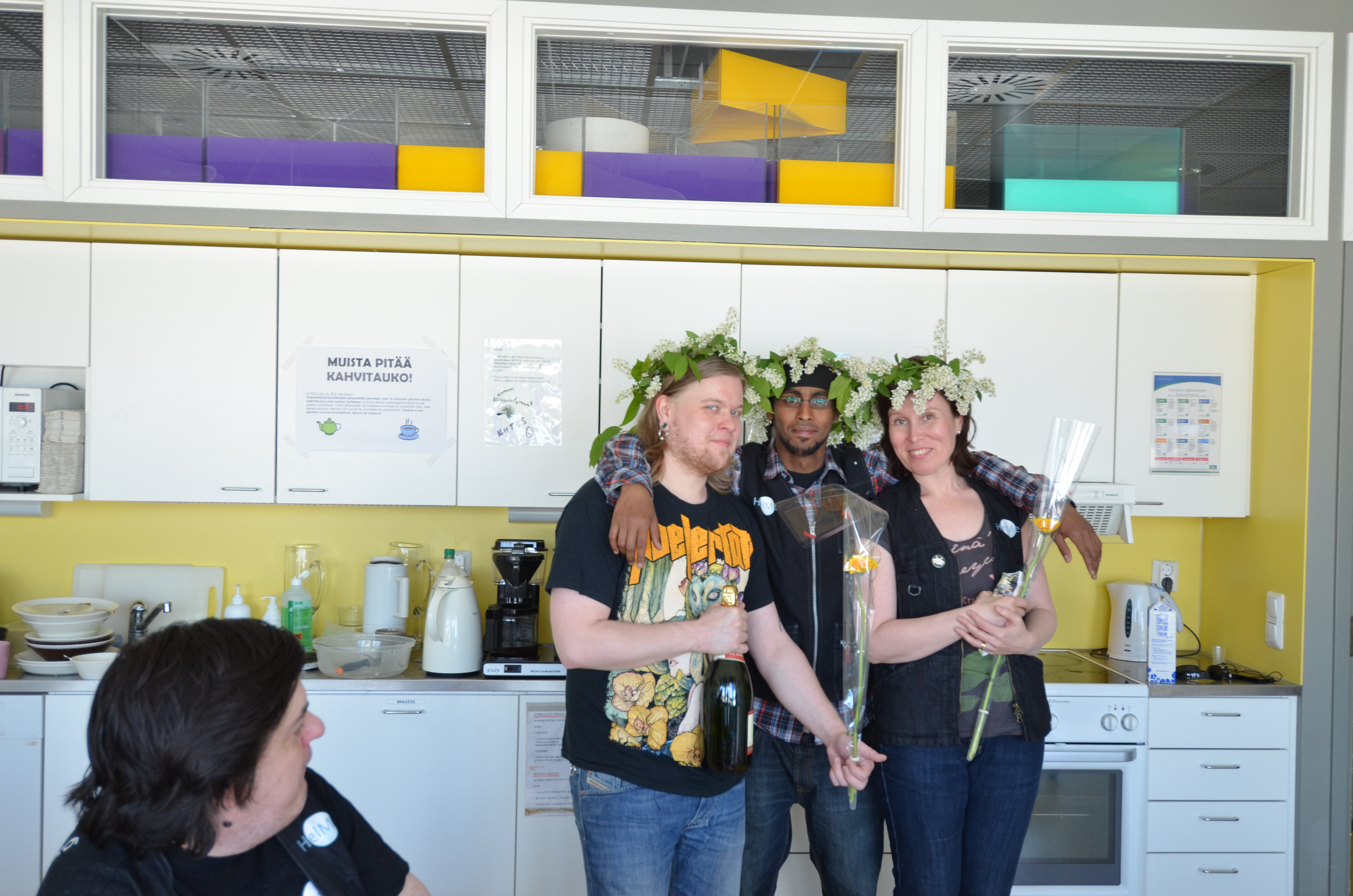
A Somali man and Finnish friends at a celebration in Helsinki.

Like other immigrant groups in Finland, particularly Muslims, Somalis have been targets of hate crimes. According to a 2009 report by the Police College of Finland, 8% of total victims were Somali-born, while representing only 4% of suspected offenders. Most suspected perpetrators are young Finnish men, with similarly aged Somali, Iraqi and Turkish immigrants mainly targeted. According to social workers, the pressure of living between two disparate cultures has also resulted in instances of petty crime amongst disaffected 17- to 20-year-olds in the Somali community. The situation is compounded by the unfamiliarity of Somali parents with the various social services that are available to address similar circumstances. To tackle the issue, Somali community organizations have teamed up with Finnish police and social services officials, with the municipal authorities in Helsinki endeavouring to recruit more Somali social workers.

In 2015, five young Somalis were suspects in a case of gang rape in Tapanila near Helsinki. The incident hardened the attitudes towards Somalis in Finland. Of the five accused, three were sentenced and two were acquitted. Four of the accused were minors and two of those therefore received shorter sentences.

As with many other immigrant groups in Finland, Somalis have also faced some barriers to employment, due in part to the local economic recession. However, the situation has steadily improved over the years, as more Somali immigrants have found employment in their own community, although much of this work is unmeasured. While some Somalis with language training have found jobs in their own field, others, like immigrants in general, have obtained short-term work positions.

== Demographics ==
Historical population
Year	Pop.	±% p.a.
1990	0	—
1995	4,057	—
2000	6,454	+9.73%
2005	8,593	+5.89%
2010	12,985	+8.61%
2015	17,871	+6.60%
2020	22,794	+4.99%
2025	28,167	+4.32%
Somali speakers. Source: Statistics Finland

Somalis are one of the largest ethnic minorities in Finland, and the largest group of people of non-European origin. They are the fifth-largest minority in the country, after Finland-Swedes, Estonians, Russians and Iraqis. In 2018, there were 6,448 Somali citizens, but an equal number may have received Finnish citizenship. According to the Finnish National newspaper, Helsingin Sanomat, the number of Somali-speaking people in Finland in 2010 rose by nearly 10% in a year. In 2021, there were 23,656 Somali speakers in Finland. 12,712 were born in Somalia.

Finnish Somalis are concentrated in the Southern parts of the country. 81% of Somalis live in Uusimaa (with 54% living in Helsinki alone), 8% in Southwest Finland, less than 3% in Pirkanmaa and 8% in the rest of Finland. 2% of Helsinkians are Somali, the highest proportion in Finland, and the second largest foreign country of origin after Russia. A slight majority of Finnish Somalis are male. 35% of Somalis are aged 0–14 (compared to 15% of the entire Finnish population). The total fertility rate of Somali women in Finland was 3.7 between 2017 and 2020, compared to 1.4 of Finnish women.

=== Population by municipalities ===
People born in Somalia and living in Finland, according to Statistics Finland.

Country of birth Somalia by municipality (2024)
Municipality	Population
Whole country	14,560
Helsinki	7,873
Vantaa	1,747
Espoo	1,642
Turku	1,096
Tampere	407
Oulu	329
Vaasa	239
Hämeenlinna	145
Kouvola	110
Rovaniemi	76
Järvenpää	64
Raisio	62
Kotka	58
Jakobstad	57
Jyväskylä	53
Kajaani	49
Lahti	49
Kemi	41
Kaarina	31
Pori	30
Joensuu	26
Kuopio	24
Porvoo	24
Vörå	22
Kerava	20
Lohja	20
Kirkkonummi	18
Lieksa	15
Uusikaupunki	14
Lappeenranta	13
Loimaa	13
Salo	13
Rauma	12
Seinäjoki	12
Valkeakoski	11
Kokkola	10
Lieto	10

People with Somali citizenship living in Finland according to Statistics Finland.

Citizens of Somalia by municipality (2024)
Municipality	Population
Whole country	6,816
Helsinki	3,424
Vantaa	717
Espoo	629
Turku	462
Tampere	259
Oulu	244
Vaasa	150
Hämeenlinna	145
Rovaniemi	76
Kouvola	66
Kotka	52
Kemi	47
Kajaani	46
Raisio	46
Jakobstad	43
Lahti	42
Järvenpää	36
Jyväskylä	29
Kuopio	27
Pori	23
Kaarina	20
Joensuu	16
Kerava	15
Loimaa	14
Porvoo	13
Seinäjoki	11
Lieto	10
Uusikaupunki	10
Valkeakoski	10

People with Somali as mother tongue living in Finland according to Statistics Finland.

Somali speakers by municipality (2024)
Municipality	Population
Whole country	26,891
Helsinki	14,910
Espoo	3,410
Vantaa	3,386
Turku	1,839
Tampere	666
Oulu	535
Vaasa	377
Hämeenlinna	209
Kouvola	164
Järvenpää	114
Rovaniemi	97
Raisio	95
Jakobstad	79
Kotka	70
Lahti	65
Kajaani	64
Jyväskylä	60
Kemi	59
Kaarina	50
Kuopio	48
Vörå	45
Joensuu	42
Lappeenranta	41
Lohja	38
Pori	34
Porvoo	29
Kerava	28
Kirkkonummi	26
Lieksa	19
Salo	19
Uusikaupunki	19
Kauniainen	18
Seinäjoki	18
Rauma	14
Kokkola	13
Kontiolahti	13
Loimaa	13
Hyvinkää	11
Mikkeli	11
Naantali	11
Valkeakoski	11
Ylöjärvi	10

== Culture ==
Religion is more important to Somali families than it is to Finnish families. 84% of Somalis consider themselves very religious, and only 1% are irreligious. Even though nearly all Somalis are Muslim, there are differences between families and individuals on how norms are perceived and obeyed. The clothing of Somali women in Finland varies from large hijabs and face covers to skinny jeans and crop tops. There are a few Christian converts and Somali atheists in Finland.

Somalis watch at least nine different Somali channels in Finland. Popular celebrations among Somalis include Eid al-Fitr and Eid al-Adha. Since 2017, it has been possible to study the Somali language and culture at the University of Helsinki.

=== Identity and society ===
Among the studied foreign-language speakers, Somali-speakers had the highest proportion identifying as Finnish, at 43%. For comparison, only 10% of Estonian-speakers identified as Finnish. 89% considered themselves to be completely Somali, and nearly half of the Somali-speakers felt that they were both Somali and Finnish. However 90% of Somali-speakers faced discrimination in the working life. This is significantly higher than among Arabic-speakers (57%), Russian-speakers (51%), English-speakers (40%) and Estonian-speakers (around a quarter). Somali-speakers had the highest proficiency of Finnish among foreign-speakers (with 29% speaking Finnish natively, and only 15% had no Finnish-skills), however were the least likely to have a Finnish-speaking friend. 45% of them had no Finnish-speaking friends. Somalis were also the most likely to think that the Finnish media gives a negative perception of their group.

== Politics ==
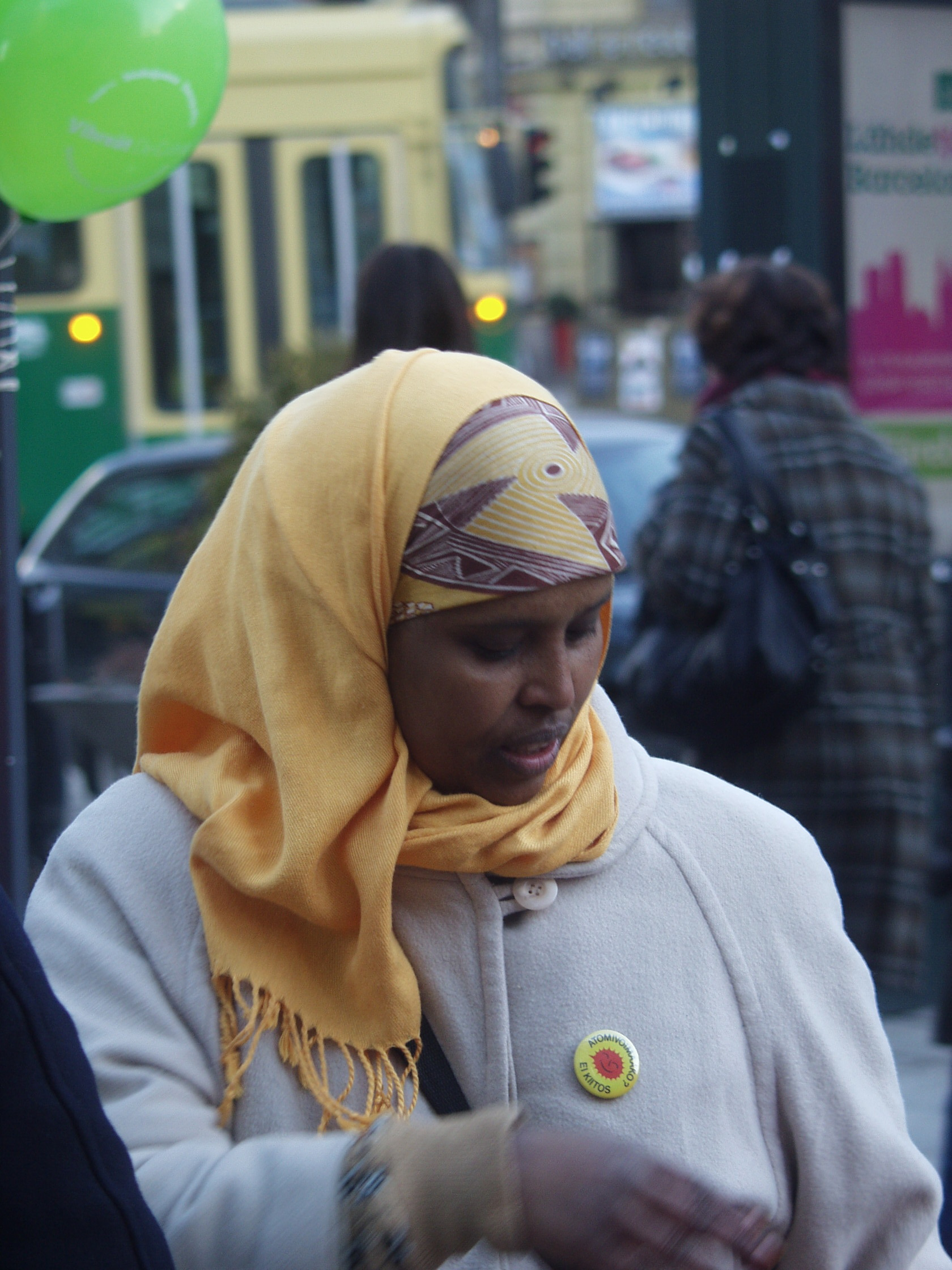
Zahra Abdulla during the 2011 Finnish election.

In the 2017 Finnish municipal elections Somalis were the most active voters among citizens of non-Finnish heritage. 39% of Somalis voted in the election, more than Swedes (36%), Russians (16%) and Estonians (10%). Suldaan Said Ahmed (Left Alliance) became Finland's first Somali-born Member of Parliament in 2021. Zahra Abdulla (Green League) was a member of the Helsinki City Council from 1997 to 2017. In 2003 she was named the Finnish Refugee Woman of the Year. The large Somali community in Finland has been cited as a positive in strengthening ties between Somalia and Finland. Finnish Somalis have been actively involved in trade and aid to Somalia.

== See also ==
- Zahra Abdulla
- Somali diaspora
- Immigration to Finland
- Racism in Finland
