= List of bus transit systems in Finland =

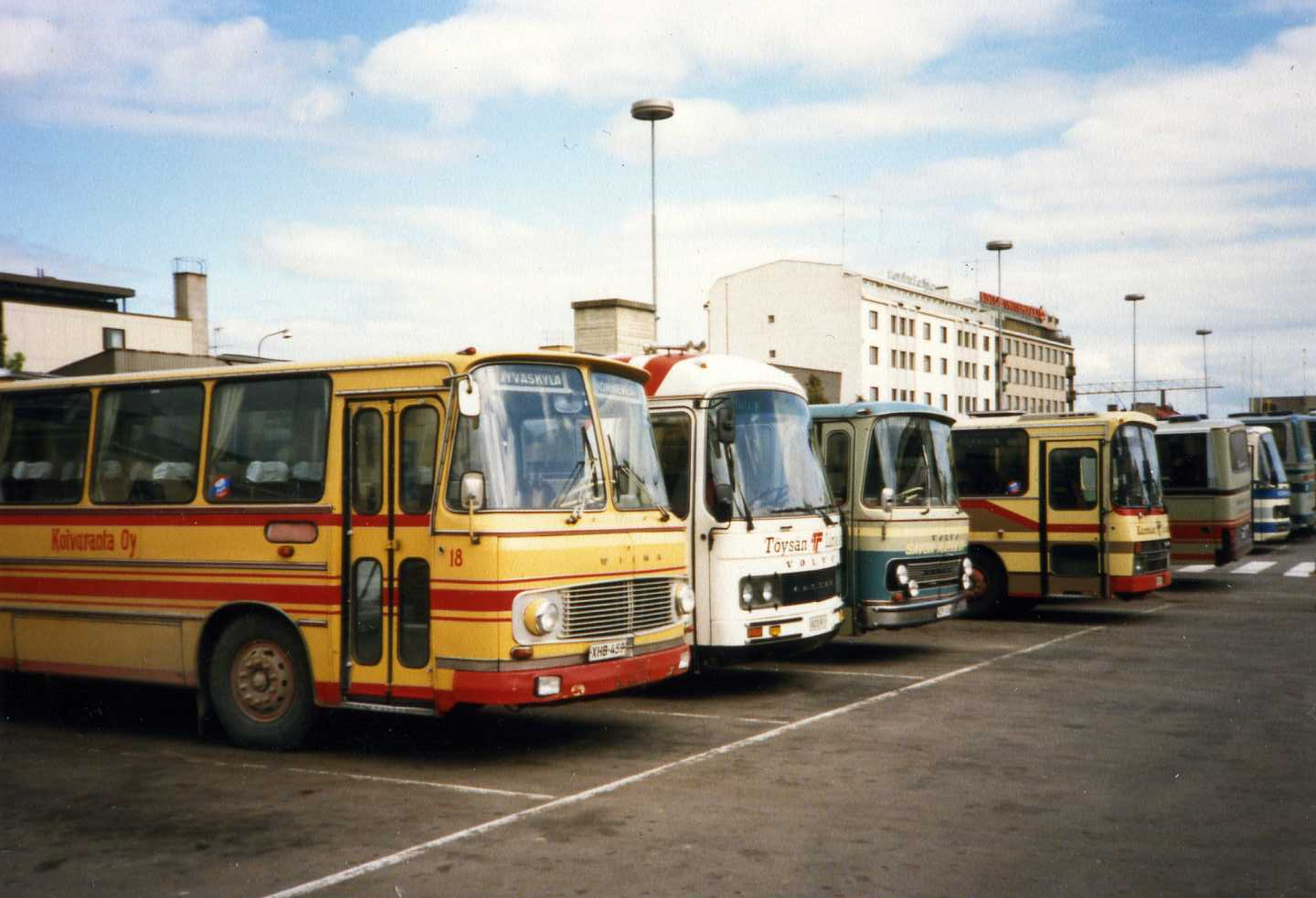
Buses in Jyväskylä, old bus station in 1987

The following is a list of presently-operating bus transit systems in Finland with regular service. The list excludes charter buses and private bus operators, but includes demand-responsive transport systems.

System	Locale	Central city or town	Website
HSL	Greater Helsinki	Helsinki	
Nysse	Tampere sub-region	Tampere	
Föli	Turku metropolitan area	Turku	
Oulun joukkoliikenne	Oulu sub-region	Oulu	
Koutsi	Kouvola sub-region	Kouvola	
Linkki	Jyväskylä sub-region	Jyväskylä	
Vilkku	Kuopio sub-region	Kuopio	
Ingå	Raseborg sub-region	Ingå	
Jakobstad	Jakobstad sub-region	Jakobstad	
Porvoo	Porvoo sub-region	Porvoo	
Riihimäki	Riihimäki sub-region	Riihimäki	
Uusikaupunki	Vakka-Suomi	Uusikaupunki	
Loimaa	Loimaa sub-region	Loimaa	
Hämeenlinna	Hämeenlinna sub-region	Hämeenlinna	
Sastamala	South Western Pirkanmaa	Sastamala	
Jämsä	Jämsä sub-region	Jämsä	
Kuusamo	Koillismaa	Kuusamo	
Iisalmi	Upper Savonia	Iisalmi	
Raahe		Raahe	
Pieksämäki		Pieksämäki	
Loviisa		Loviisa	
Jonne & Minne		Kotka	
Jouko		Lappeenranta	
JOJO		Joensuu	
Rovaniemi		Rovaniemi	
Tornio		Tornio	
Pori		Pori	
Salon joukkoliikenne		Salo	
Joukkis	South Savo, North Karelia, North Savo	Iisalmi, Joensuu, Mikkeli, Savonlinna, Kuopio, Varkaus	
Ålandstrafiken	Åland	Mariehamn	
Seutu+	Southwest Finland, Satakunta	Turku	
Lohja		Lohja	
VAU-liikenne	Southern Pirkanmaa	Akaa	
Bosse		Raseborg	
Kemi		Kemi	
LSL		Lahti	
Lifti		Vaasa	
Seinäjoki		Seinäjoki	
BYSSE		Kokkola	
Katuri		Mikkeli	
Savonlinna		Savonlinna	
Hyvinkää		Hyvinkää	
Forssa		Forssa	

== See also ==
- Transport in Finland
