= Hans Osara =

Hans Larsson (Finnish: Hannu Laurinpoika; c. 1560 – 1601) was lieutenant in the Cudgel War at the end of 16th century. He was also the head of Klaus Fleming's military unit in Hämeenkyrö, Finland.

== Biography ==
Hans Larsson's background is not entirely certain. Certain sources claim he was the son of a vicar of Lammi parish, but some claim he was descended from the Roth Family, possibly the son of Lars Hansson Roth.

In 1588, he had served as cavalryman with the rank of Lieutenant Valentin Göding. In 1594, two years before the Cudgel War, Sigismund III Vasa granted Hans Larsson because of his loyalty to the King, a Osara house and five wilderness houses in Pakula, which later became Osara Manor. Three years after the defeat of the peasant rebellion, Sigismund also gave the whole of the nineteen farmhouse village of Inkula, Viljakkala. As the lord of the manor, Hans Larsson was the most powerful and wealthiest man in Osara village and in the whole of Hämeenkyrö.

When Duke Charles became king of Sweden in 1600, he started trials of the other party involved, against Sigismund, and Fleming's supporters. Hans Larsson was also soon imprisoned and brought to justice. He sought to influence the verdict by appealing to his nobility, but he did not have the necessary evidence because the Russians had burned the documents during the war of 1575–1595. Larsson was sentenced to death in 1601. The exact date of his execution is uncertain, but he was declared dead on October 14, 1601 at the Hämeenkyrö district and his wife Kirstin is mentioned as a widow. After receiving his verdict, he lost his ranch in Osara and Inkula.

Hans Larsson and Kirstin were known to have only three daughters: Margareta, Brita and Kerstin.

== See also ==
- War against Sigismund
- Cudgel War
