= Helsinki sub-region =

Sub-region in Uusimaa, Finland

Helsinki sub-region Helsingin seutukunta Helsingfors ekonomiska region SK011 Helsinki
- Sub-region
- Country: Finland
- Region: Uusimaa
- Capital: Helsinki

Area
  - Land: 5,123 km^{2} (1,978 sq mi)

Population
  - Total: 1,683,184
  - Density: 329/km^{2} (850/sq mi)
- Time zone: UTC+2 (EET)
  - Summer (DST): UTC+3 (EEST)

Helsinki sub-region is a subdivision of Uusimaa in Finland. It is the most populous sub-region in Finland with about 1.7 million inhabitants. The sub-regions are used for statistical purposes. Statistics Finland uses the term Helsinki sub-region as SK011 Helsinki. The Lohja sub-region was merged with the Helsinki sub-region in 2009.

The Helsinki sub-region differs from the Helsinki metropolitan area (Greater Helsinki), which does not include the municipalities of Karkkila, Lohja and Siuntio. The metropolitan area has a population of about 1.62 million.

The smaller Helsinki capital region is the area comprising Espoo, Helsinki, Kauniainen and Vantaa. It has a population of about 1.28 million.

== Municipalities ==
Coat of arms	Municipality	Population	Land area (km^{2})	Density (/km^{2})	Finnish speakers	Swedish speakers	Other speakers
Espoon vaakuna	Espoo	325,716	312	1,043	68 %	6 %	26 %
Helsingin vaakuna	Helsinki	694,392	214	3,238	73 %	5 %	21 %
Hyvinkään vaakuna	Hyvinkää	47,015	323	146	90 %	1 %	9 %
Järvenpään vaakuna	Järvenpää	46,944	38	1,251	89 %	1 %	10 %
Karkkilan vaakuna	Karkkila	8,274	242	34	91 %	1 %	9 %
Kauniaisen vaakuna	Kauniainen	10,318	6	1,752	59 %	30 %	11 %
Keravan vaakuna	Kerava	38,767	31	1,266	81 %	1 %	18 %
Kirkkonummen vaakuna	Kirkkonummi	41,725	367	114	72 %	14 %	13 %
Lohjan vaakuna	Lohja	45,435	940	48	89 %	3 %	7 %
Mäntsälän vaakuna	Mäntsälä	20,861	581	36	93 %	1 %	6 %
Nurmijärven vaakuna	Nurmijärvi	45,333	362	125	90 %	1 %	8 %
Pornaisen vaakuna	Pornainen	4,919	147	34	94 %	2 %	4 %
Sipoon vaakuna	Sipoo	23,006	340	68	65 %	27 %	8 %
Siuntion vaakuna	Siuntio	6,192	241	26	65 %	26 %	9 %
Tuusulan vaakuna	Tuusula	42,479	220	193	90 %	1 %	9 %
Vantaan vaakuna	Vantaa	252,956	238	1,061	68 %	2 %	30 %
Vihdin vaakuna	Vihti	28,852	522	55	91 %	2 %	8 %
	Total	1,683,184	5,123	329	71 %	5 %	20 %

== See also ==
- Tampere sub-region
- Turku sub-region
