= Turku sub-region =

Sub-region in Southwest Finland, Finland

Turku sub-region Turun seutukunta SK023 Turku
- Sub-region
- Country: Finland
- Region: Southwest Finland
- Capital: Turku

Population
  - Total: 355,791
- Time zone: UTC+2 (EET)
  - Summer (DST): UTC+3 (EEST)

Turku sub-region is a subdivision of Southwest Finland in Finland. It is the third most populous sub-region in Finland with about 356,000 inhabitants after Helsinki and Tampere. The sub-regions are used for statistical purposes. Statistics Finland uses the term Turku sub-region as SK023 Turku.

The Turku sub-region differs from the Turku metropolitan area (Greater Turku), which does not include the municipalities of Masku, Mynämäki, Nousiainen, Paimio and Sauvo. The metropolitan area has a population of about 320,000.

== Municipalities ==
Coat of arms	Municipality	Population	Land area (km^{2})	Density (/km^{2})	Finnish speakers	Swedish speakers	Other speakers
Coat of arms of Kaarina	Kaarina	36,675	151	244	88 %	5 %	7 %
Coat of arms of Lieto	Lieto	20,732	301	69	94 %	2 %	5 %
Coat of arms of Masku	Masku	9,612	175	55	96 %	1 %	3 %
Coat of arms of Mynämäki	Mynämäki	7,424	520	14	95 %	1 %	4 %
Coat of arms of Naantali	Naantali	20,390	313	65	94 %	1 %	5 %
Coat of arms of Nousiainen	Nousiainen	4,667	199	23	95 %	1 %	4 %
Coat of arms of Paimio	Paimio	11,284	239	47	94 %	1 %	5 %
Coat of arms of Raisio	Raisio	26,036	49	534	84 %	1 %	15 %
Coat of arms of Rusko	Rusko	6,381	127	50	95 %	2 %	3 %
Coat of arms of Sauvo	Sauvo	2,957	253	12	90 %	2 %	7 %
Coat of arms of Turku	Turku	209,633	246	853	77 %	5 %	18 %
	Total	355,791	2,570	138	82 %	4 %	13 %

== See also ==
- Helsinki sub-region
- Tampere sub-region
