= Ylöjärvi =

- Town
- Ylöjärven kaupunki Ylöjärvi stad
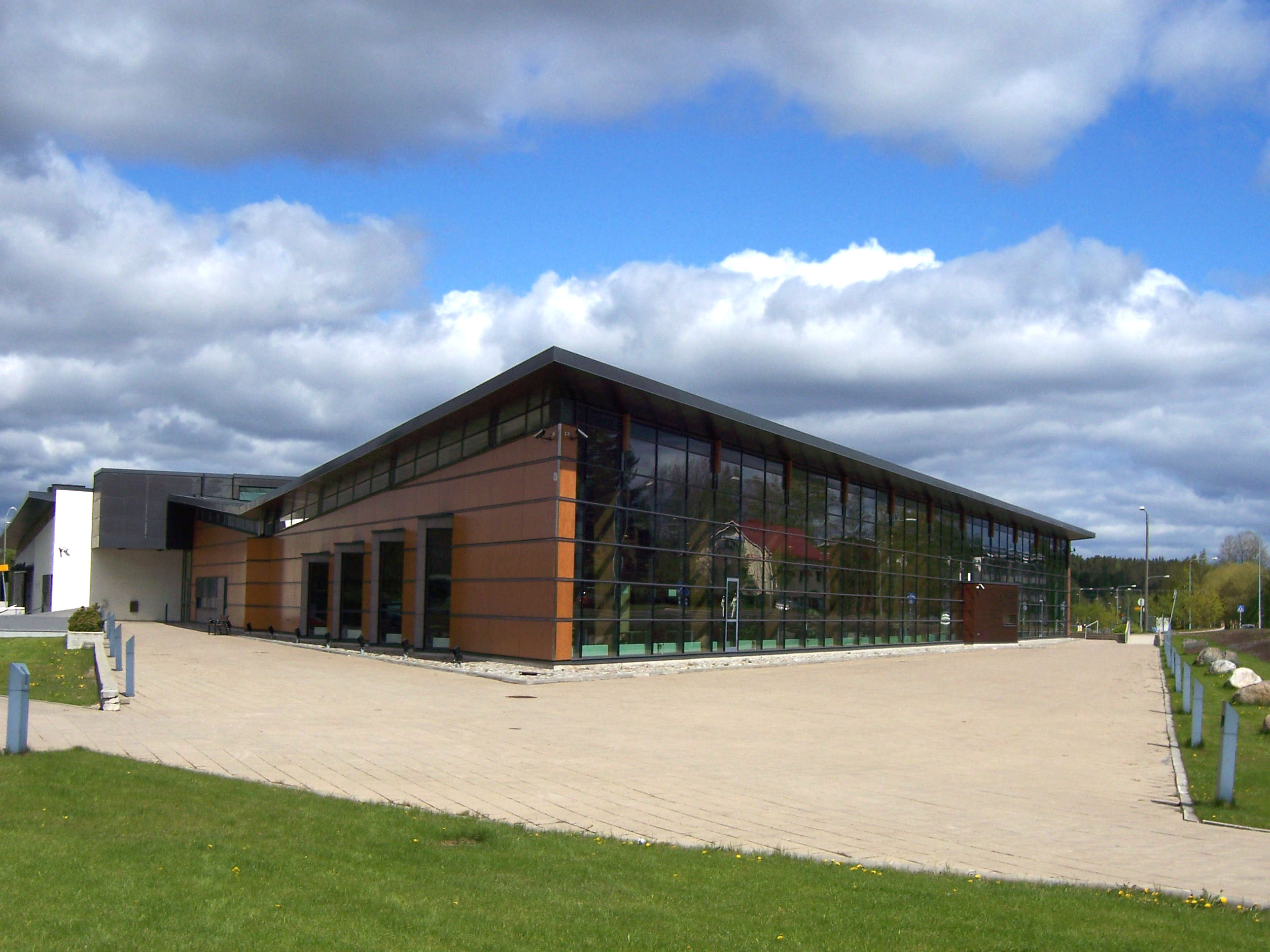
- Ylöjärvi library

- Coat of arms

- Location of Ylöjärvi in Finland
- Interactive map of Ylöjärvi
- Coordinates: 61°33′N 023°35′E
- Country: Finland
- Region: Pirkanmaa
- Sub-region: Tampere
- Metropolitan area: Tampere
- Charter: 1869
- Town: 2004

Government
  - Town manager: Pauli Piiparinen

Area (2018-01-01)
  - Total: 1,324.14 km^{2} (511.25 sq mi)
  - Land: 1,115.75 km^{2} (430.79 sq mi)
  - Water: 208.62 km^{2} (80.55 sq mi)
  - Rank: 69th largest in Finland

Population (2025-12-31)
  - Total: 33,658
  - Rank: 35th largest in Finland
  - Density: 30.17/km^{2} (78.1/sq mi)

Population by native language
  - Finnish: 96.2% (official)
  - Swedish: 0.4%
  - Others: 3.4%

Population by age
  - 0 to 14: 20.8%
  - 15 to 64: 60.7%
  - 65 or older: 18.5%
- Time zone: UTC+02:00 (EET)
  - Summer (DST): UTC+03:00 (EEST)
- Unemployment rate: 21%
- Website: www.ylojarvi.fi

Ylöjärvi (Finnish: [ˈyløˌjærʋi]) is a town in Finland, located in the Pirkanmaa region. It lies to the west of the regional capital, Tampere. The population of Ylöjärvi is approximately 34,000, while the metropolitan area has a population of approximately 428,000. It is the 35th most populous municipality in Finland, and the fourth largest in the Pirkanmaa region after Tampere, Nokia, and Kangasala.

Ylöjärvi is located 14 kilometres (9 mi) northwest of Tampere and 189 kilometres (117 mi) north of the capital city of Helsinki in Finland. Ylöjärvi has an area of 1,324.14 square kilometres (511.25 sq mi) of which 208.62 km^{2} (80.55 sq mi) is water. The population density is 30.17 inhabitants per square kilometre (78.1/sq mi).

Ylöjärvi is mainly a rural town. It does not have a clear centre; the Tampere-Vaasa highway (E12) and the Tampere-Seinäjoki railway divide the centre of the municipality into two large distinct parts: the Church Village and Soppeenmäki. The railway, completed in 1971, has no passenger seats in the Ylöjärvi area, so buses provide all public transport. The population has grown in recent years. In 1990 it was about 18,000, in 2011 it was about 30,000, and now it is about 34,000.

The neighbouring municipalities are Hämeenkyrö, Ikaalinen, Kihniö, Nokia, Parkano, Ruovesi, Tampere and Virrat. The municipality of Viljakkala was merged with Ylöjärvi in 2007. The municipality of Kuru was merged with Ylöjärvi in 2009. The coat of arms of Ylöjärvi was designed by Gustaf von Numers and confirmed in 1954.

The results of the 2025 Finnish municipal elections resulted in the Social Democratic Party being the largest political party on the Ylöjärvi council.

== History ==
The chapel parish of Ylöjärvi was founded in 1779 by separating it from Pirkkala. The first church in Ylöjärvi, located on the site of the current church, was completed in 1781, but was destroyed in a fire caused by lightning in 1842. Ylöjärvi was founded as a municipality in 1869. Since January 1, 2004, it has been known as a town (kaupunki). The Finnish Museum of Refrigeration is also located in Ylöjärvi.

== Demographics ==
=== Population ===
Historical population
Year	Pop.	±% p.a.
1805	1,336	—
1860	2,338	+1.02%
1900	3,098	+0.71%
1930	4,304	+1.10%
1964	8,809	+2.13%
1990	23,434	+3.83%
2000	25,299	+0.77%
2010	30,500	+1.89%
2020	33,352	+0.90%
Source: Notes:^{1} Lielahti was annexed to Tampere in 1950^{2} Viljakkala was annexed to Ylöjärvi in 2007 and Kuru in 2009 Sources: Statistics Finland; Historian suursanakirja.

Population size 1990–2025
Year	Population
1990	23,434
1995	24,223
2000	25,299
2005	27,876
2010	30,500
2015	32,738
2020	33,352
2025	33,658

== Culture ==
=== Food ===
In the 1980s, overly sweetened limppu and the "sauna smoked" ham were named Ylöjärvi's traditional parish dishes.

=== Tree Mountain ===
The town is the location of Tree Mountain, land art by Agnes Denes. This work was conceived in 1983, and construction was announced by the Finnish government at the 1992 Earth Summit. Construction was complete in 1996, and the site is legally protected for the next 400 years. Tree Mountain was dedicated in June 1996 by the President of Finland.

== Notable people ==
- Aron (born 1968), singer, songwriter, and musician
- Marko Asell (born 1970), Greco-Roman wrestler and politician
- Jenni Banerjee (born 1981), actress
- Volmari Iso-Hollo (1907–1969), runner
- Esa Keskinen (born 1965), ice hockey player
- Tauno Kovanen (1917–1986), Greco-Roman wrestler
- Kirsi Kunnas (1924–2021), writer, poet, and translator
- Linda Leppänen (born 1990), ice hockey player and coach
- Rosa Lindstedt (born 1988), ice hockey player and coach
- Jaakko Löytty (born 1955), gospel musician
- Eino Mäkinen (1926–2014), weightlifter
- Matti Niemi (born 1937), rower
- Saara Niemi (born 1986), ice hockey player and coach
- Hannu Oksanen (born 1957), ice hockey player
- Jaakko Syrjä (1926–2022), writer
- Juuse Tamminen (1888–1962), writer
- Jukka Tyrkkö (1912–1979), war writer
- Antti Tyrväinen (1933–2013), biathlete
- Maria Ylipää (born 1981), singer and actress
- Konsta Helenius (born 2006), ice hockey player

The rock band Eppu Normaali originates in Ylöjärvi.

== International relations ==
=== Twin towns — Sister cities ===
Ylöjärvi is twinned with:

Arvika, Sweden; Balatonföldvár, Hungary; Kongsvinger, Norway	Saku Parish, Estonia; Skive, Denmark; Vyshny Volochyok, Russia

== Gallery ==
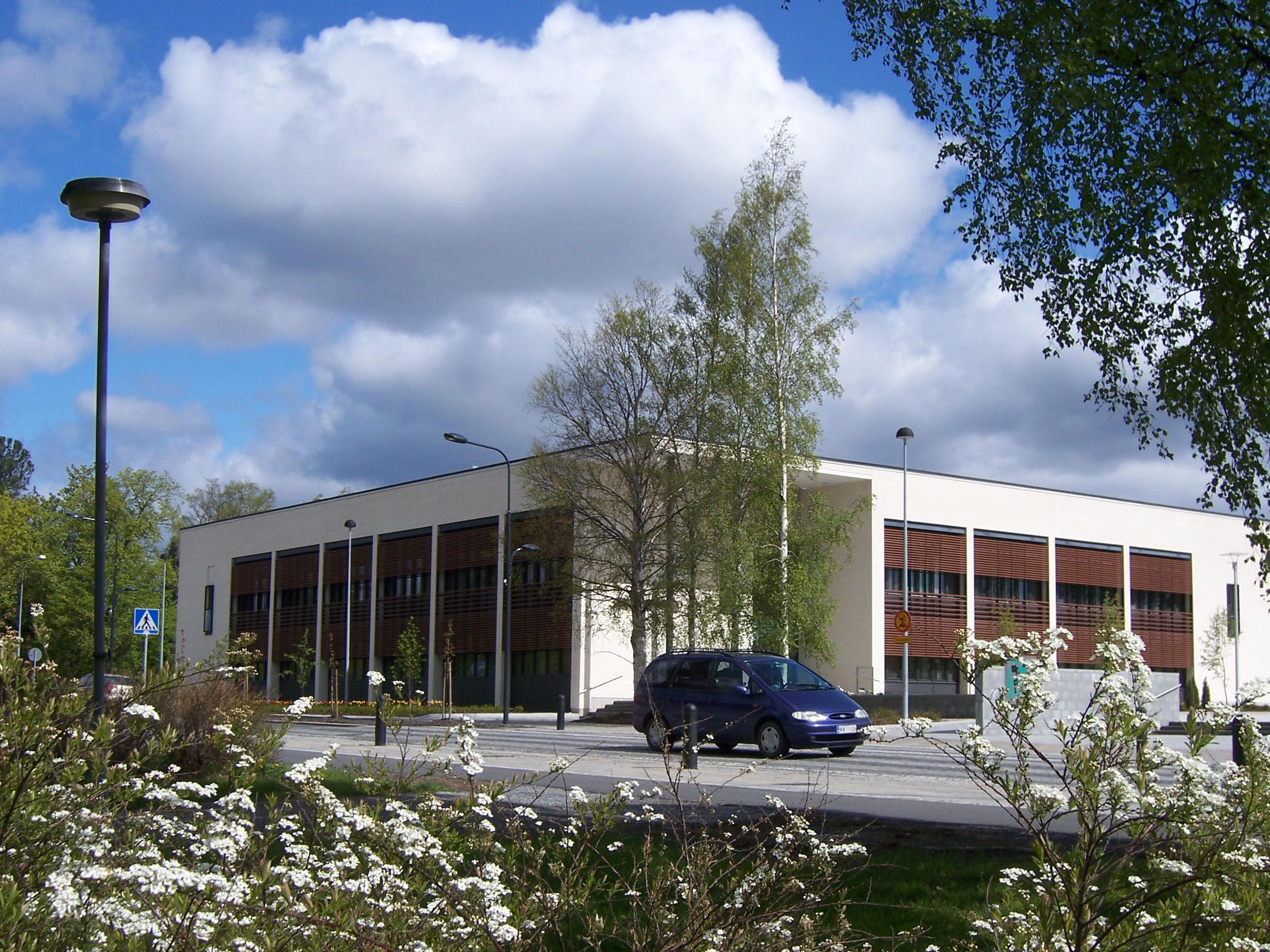
Ylöjärvi Town Hall

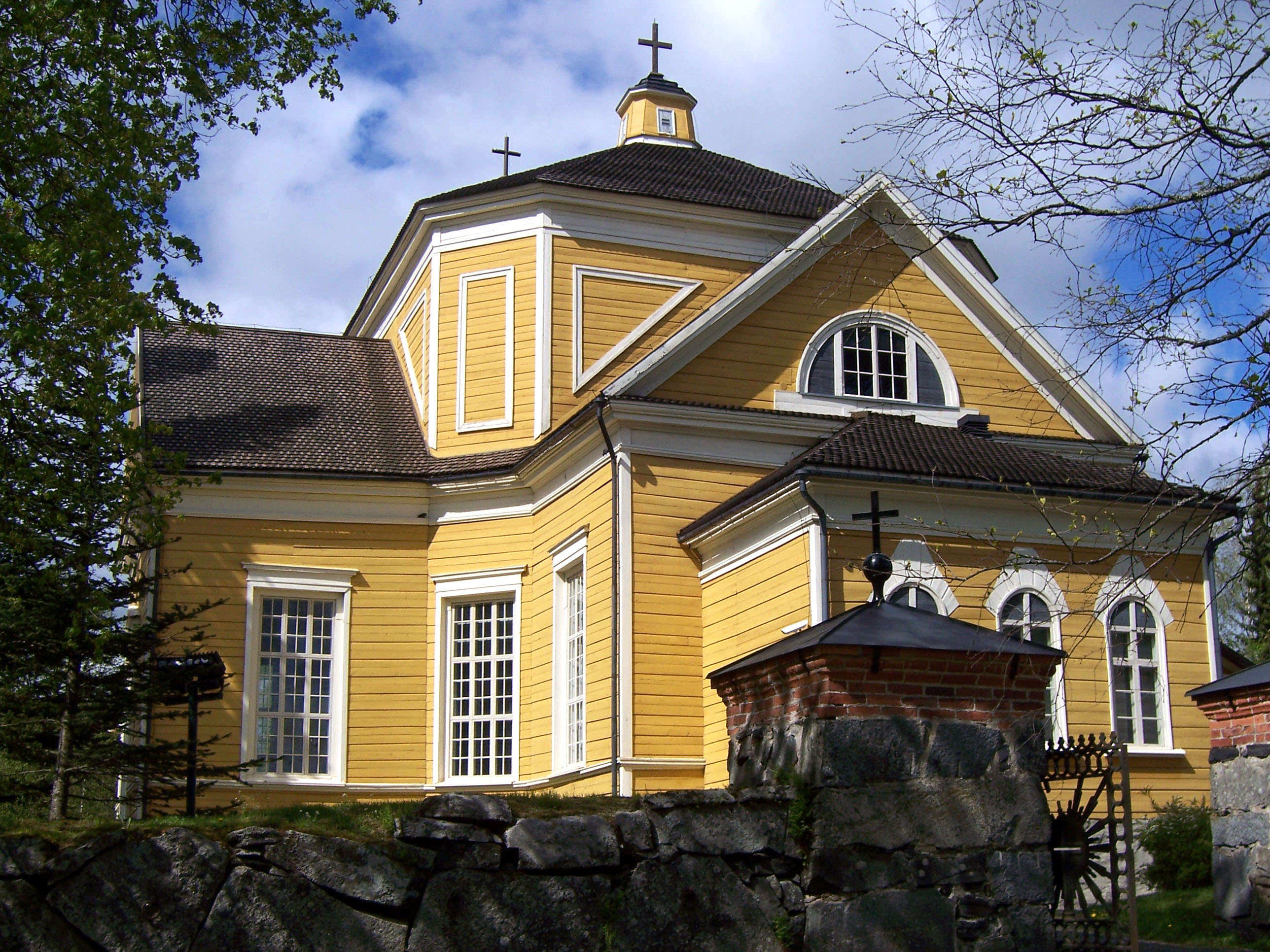
Ylöjärvi Church

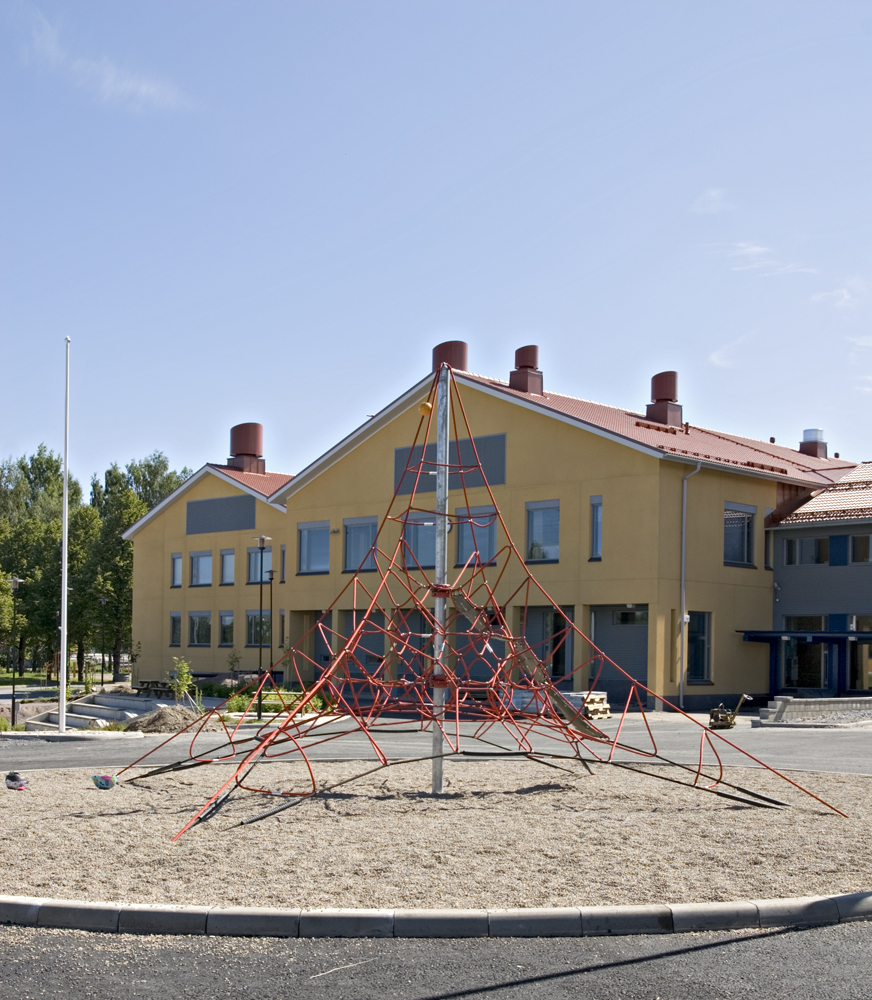
Ylöjärvi Comprehensive School

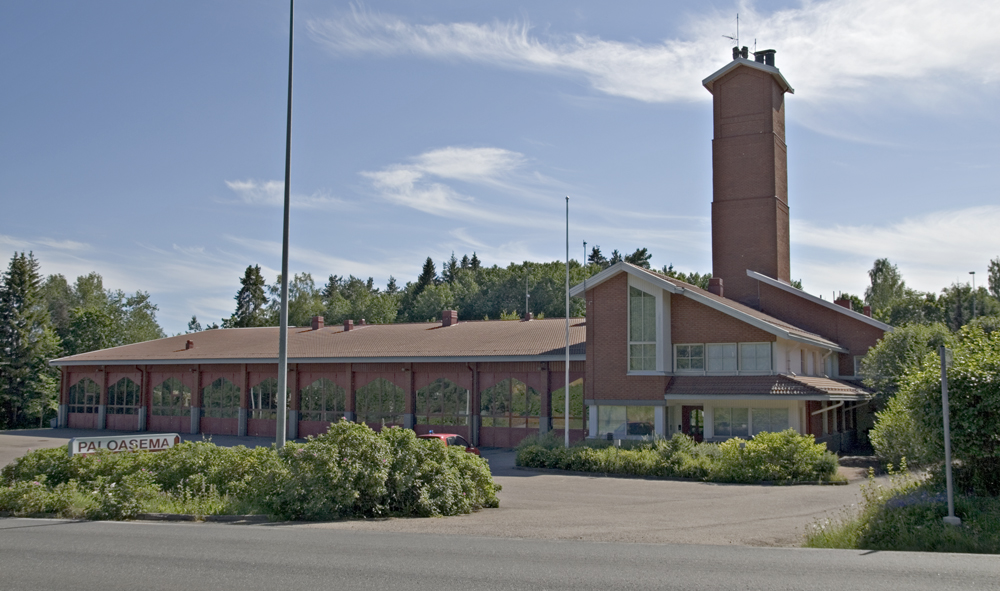
Ylöjärvi Fire station

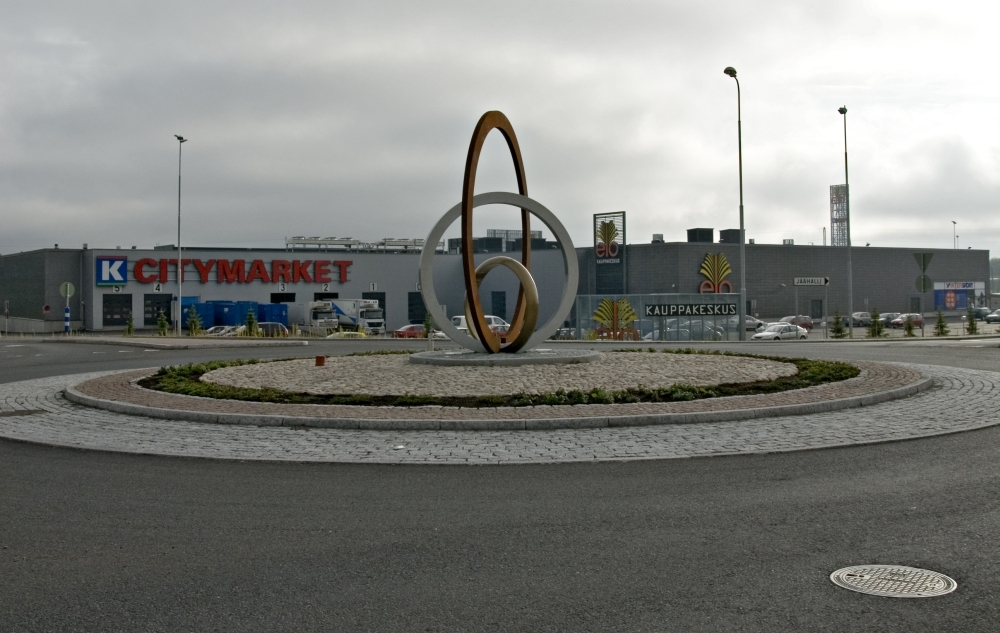
Elovainio Shopping Center

== See also ==
- Tankki täyteen
