= Rusko =

- Municipality
- Ruskon kunta Rusko kommun
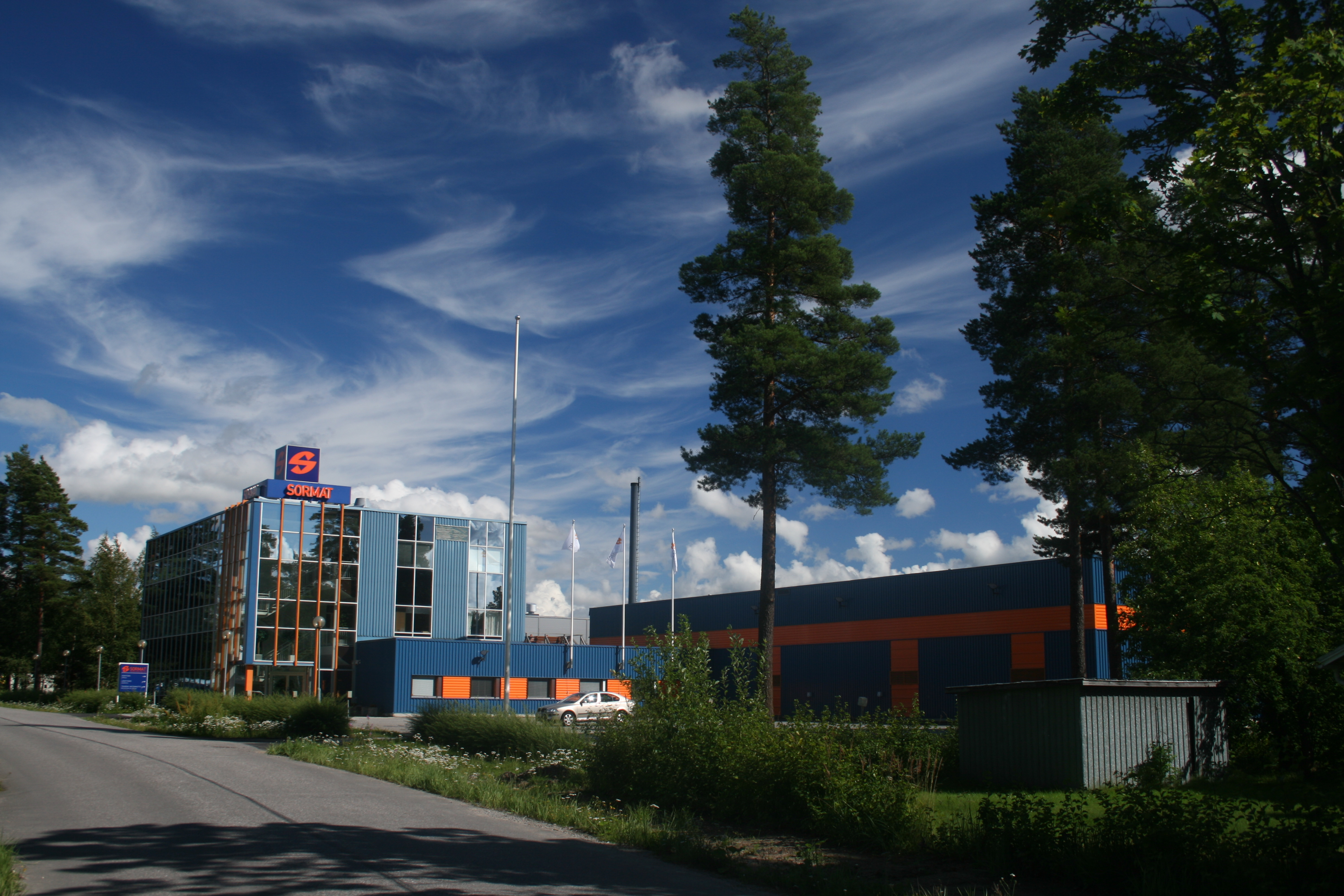
- Sormat office in Rusko

- Flag Coat of arms

- Location of Rusko in Finland
- Interactive map of Rusko
- Coordinates: 60°32.5′N 022°13.5′E
- Country: Finland
- Region: Southwest Finland
- Sub-region: Turku sub-region
- Metropolitan area: Turku metropolitan area

Government
  - Municipal manager: Arto Oikarinen

Area (2018-01-01)
  - Total: 127.90 km^{2} (49.38 sq mi)
  - Land: 127.16 km^{2} (49.10 sq mi)
  - Water: 0.78 km^{2} (0.30 sq mi)
  - Rank: 287th largest in Finland

Population (2025-12-31)
  - Total: 6,381
  - Rank: 143rd largest in Finland
  - Density: 50.18/km^{2} (130.0/sq mi)

Population by native language
  - Finnish: 95.1% (official)
  - Swedish: 1.5%
  - Others: 3.4%

Population by age
  - 0 to 14: 20.1%
  - 15 to 64: 60.3%
  - 65 or older: 19.6%
- Time zone: UTC+02:00 (EET)
  - Summer (DST): UTC+03:00 (EEST)
- Climate: Dfb
- Website: rusko.fi

Rusko (Finnish pronunciation: [ˈrusko]) is a municipality of Finland.

It is located in Western Finland and is part of the Southwest Finland region. The municipality has a population of 6,381 (31 December 2025) and covers an area of 127.90 square kilometres (49.38 sq mi) of which 0.78 km^{2} (0.30 sq mi) is water. The population density is 50.18 inhabitants per square kilometre (130.0/sq mi).

The municipality is unilingually Finnish.

The municipality of Vahto was consolidated with Rusko on 1 January 2009.
