= Vesilahti =

- Municipality
- Vesilahden kunta Vesilahti kommun
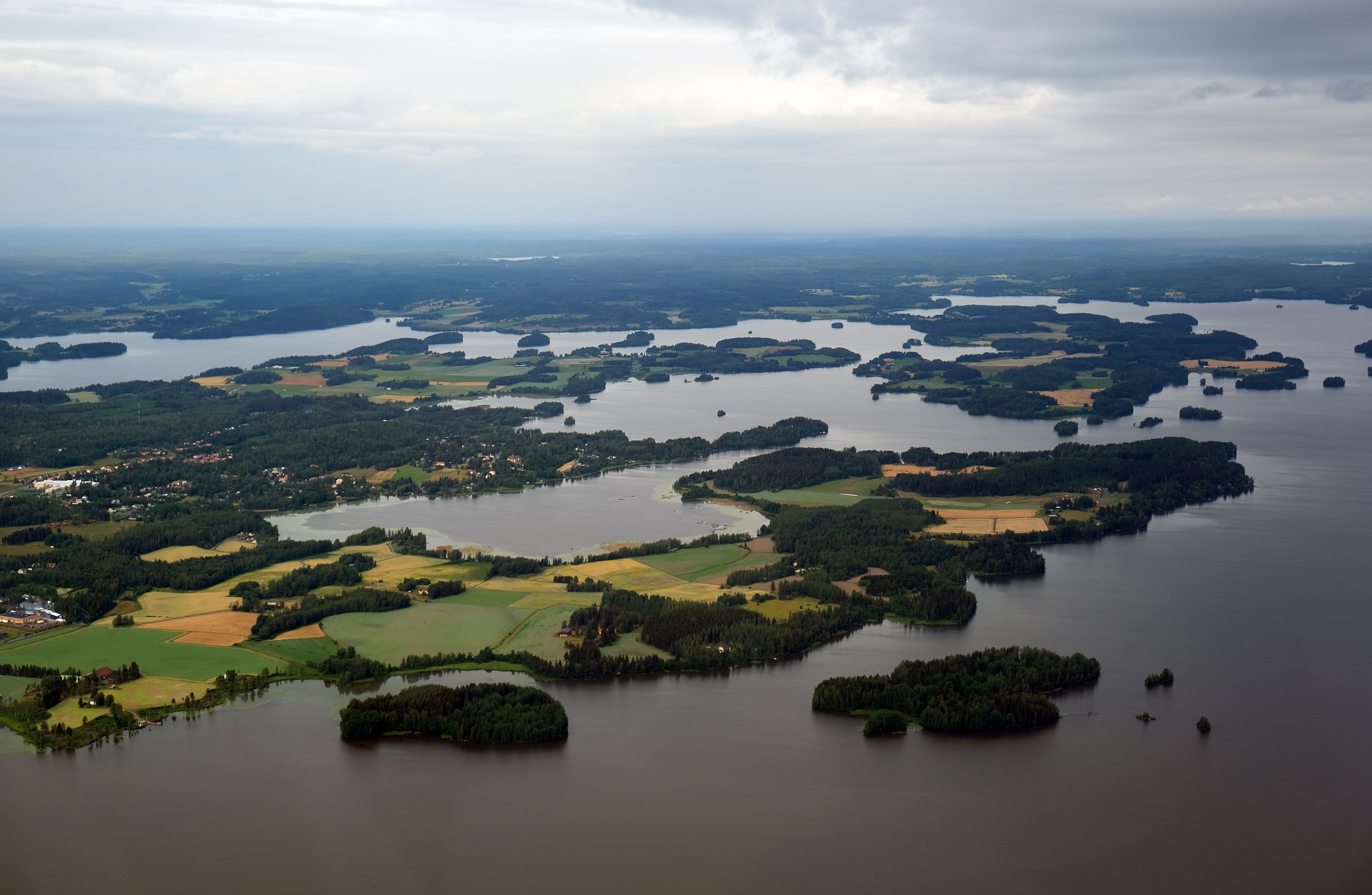

- Coat of arms

- Location of Vesilahti in Finland
- Interactive map of Vesilahti
- Coordinates: 61°18.5′N 023°37′E
- Country: Finland
- Region: Pirkanmaa
- Sub-region: Tampere
- Metropolitan area: Tampere
- Charter: 1869

Area (2018-01-01)
  - Total: 353.94 km^{2} (136.66 sq mi)
  - Land: 301.04 km^{2} (116.23 sq mi)
  - Water: 52.99 km^{2} (20.46 sq mi)
  - Rank: 234th largest in Finland

Population (2025-12-31)
  - Total: 4,532
  - Rank: 180th largest in Finland
  - Density: 15.05/km^{2} (39.0/sq mi)

Population by native language
  - Finnish: 97.2% (official)
  - Swedish: 0.4%
  - Others: 2.4%

Population by age
  - 0 to 14: 19.5%
  - 15 to 64: 61.7%
  - 65 or older: 18.8%
- Time zone: UTC+02:00 (EET)
  - Summer (DST): UTC+03:00 (EEST)
- Website: www.vesilahti.fi

Vesilahti (Swedish: Vesilahti, also Vesilax) is a municipality in Finland, located in the Pirkanmaa region. It lies to the southwest of the regional capital, Tampere. The population of Vesilahti is approximately 5,000, while the metropolitan area has a population of approximately 428,000. It is the 180th most populous municipality in Finland.

Vesilahti has an area of 353.94 square kilometres (136.66 sq mi) of which 52.99 km^{2} (20.46 sq mi) is water. The population density is 15.05 inhabitants per square kilometre (39.0/sq mi).

The municipality is unilingually Finnish. The name of municipality literally means "water bay".

The Vesilahti municipality headlined the case of "pink house", which is owned one of local inhabitants, Katri Hakola. The municipality did not agree with her color choice and threatened the homeowner with a 5,000 € penalty if the color of the house did not change. Later, the municipality tended to accept only a slight change in color and abolished the penalty payment. The incident sparked emotions on social media and the indignities accused the municipality of "bureaucratic teasing".

== Born in Vesilahti ==
- Jonne Järvelä, musician, member of the band Korpiklaani
