= Tampere metropolitan area =

Metropolitan area in Pirkanmaa, Finland

Tampere metropolitan area Tampereen kaupunkiseutu – Tammerfors stadsregion
- Metropolitan area
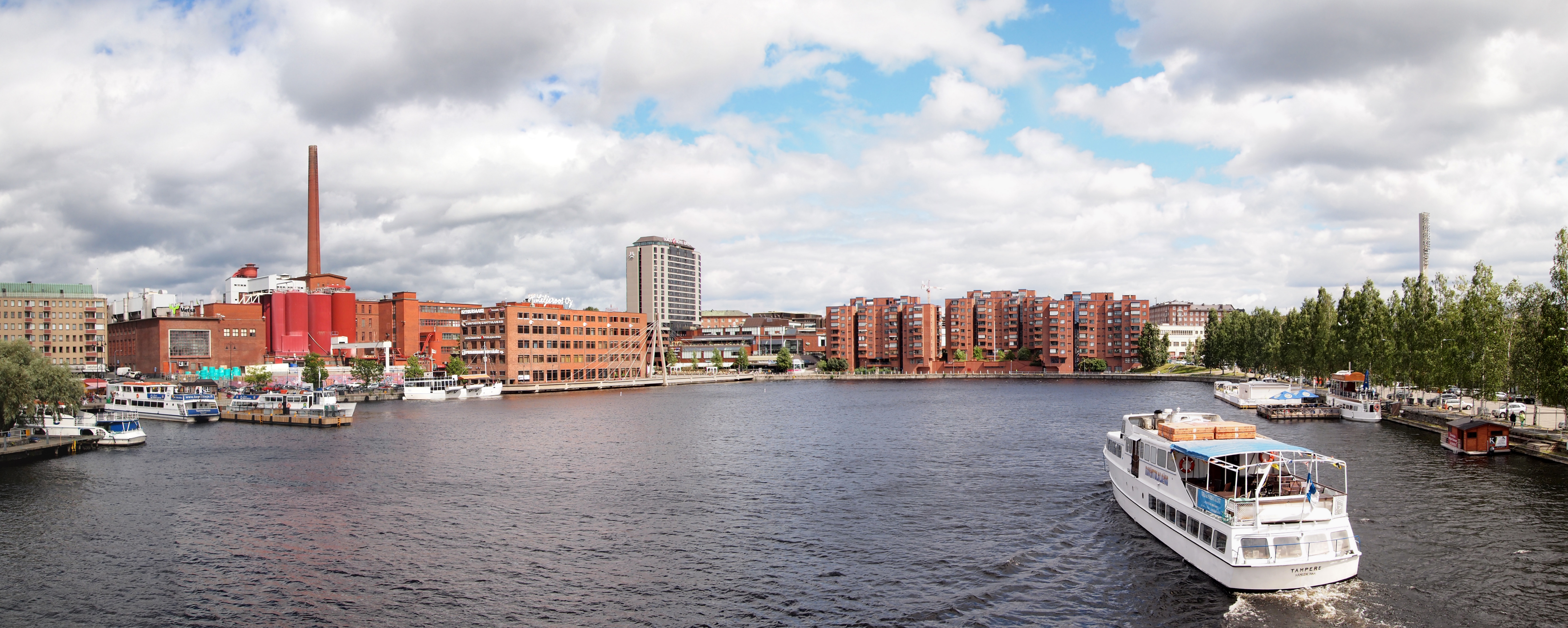
- Boat on the river Tammerkoski

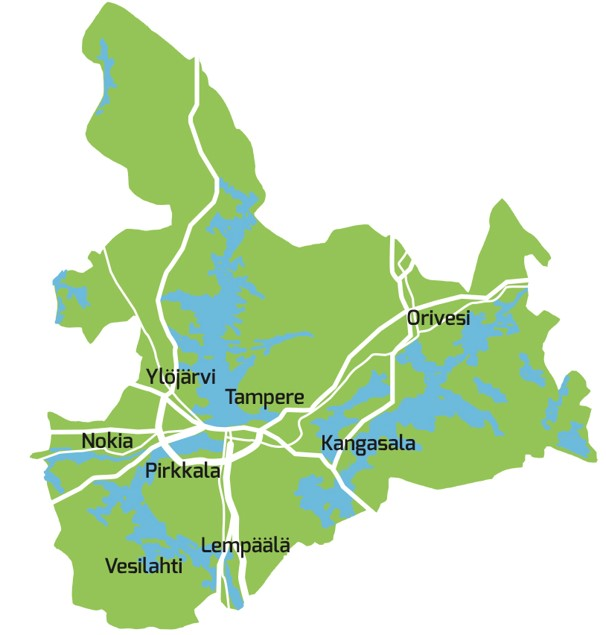
- Country: Finland
- Region: Pirkanmaa
- Sub-region: Tampere sub-region
- Seat: Tampere

Area
  - Land: 4,038.72 km^{2} (1,559.36 sq mi)

Population (2025-12-31)
  - Total: 427,749
  - Density: 105.9/km^{2} (274/sq mi)

GDP
  - Total: €22.1 billion (2021)
- Website: Tampereen seutu

Tampere metropolitan area or Tampere region (Finnish: Tampereen seutu, Swedish: Tammerfors region) is the metropolitan area around the city of Tampere in Finland. The joint municipal authority of the Tampere city region (Finnish: Tampereen kaupunkiseutu, Swedish: Tammerfors stadsregion) consists of eight municipalities: Tampere, Kangasala, Lempäälä, Nokia, Orivesi, Pirkkala, Vesilahti and Ylöjärvi. The Tampere metropolitan area forms a compact, urban-like regional growth centre where people commute from a relatively large area of the Pirkanmaa region.

The Tampere metropolitan area has a population of about 428,000, making it the second largest region in Finland after Helsinki. The terms Tampere metropolitan area, Tampere region, Tampere city region, Greater Tampere and the other terms used are not fixed and may vary in different contexts.

Tampere metropolitan area differs from the Tampere sub-region (Finnish: Tampereen seutukunta), which also includes the municipalities of Hämeenkyrö, Kuhmoinen and Pälkäne. The Tampere sub-region is used for statistical purposes. It is based on cooperation between municipalities and the commuting area. The sub-region has a population of about 446,000.

== Public services ==
Public transport in the Tampere area is managed by Nysse. In addition to Tampere, the service area includes Kangasala, Lempäälä, Nokia, Orivesi, Pirkkala, Vesilahti and Ylöjärvi. Valkeakoski uses the Nysse Ticketing system, but transport is organized by the city of Valkeakoski and the Pirkanmaa ELY-Centre.

Public water services in the cities of Tampere and Pirkkala are managed by Tampere Water. It also provides partial services in the municipalities of Nokia, Lempäälä, Kangasala and Ylöjärvi. Tampere Water is responsible for the supply, treatment and distribution of clean water, the construction and maintenance of networks, the transport of wastewater, rainwater and snowmelt, the maintenance of the sewerage system and the treatment of wastewater. Its activities are governed by licences, laws and regulations.

== Joint municipal authority ==
The joint municipal authority of the Tampere city region organises the regional cooperation of the municipalities such as the regional planning of the municipal structure, the development of services and business cooperation.

The highest decision-making authority in the Tampere city region is exercised by the general assembly, which, among other things, elects the regional noard and approves the budget. The task of the 13-member regional board is to initiate cooperation projects and present regional solutions to the member municipalities. The regional board is supported by the municipal councils, whose task is to promote and participate in the preparation of issues in the municipalities. Issues are prepared in regional working groups such as land use and housing, transport, social services and infrastructure services.

== Municipalities ==
Coat of arms	Municipality	Population	Land area (km^{2})	Density (/km^{2})	Finnish speakers	Swedish speakers	Other speakers
Coat of arms of Kangasala	Kangasala	34,379	658	52	96 %	0.3 %	4 %
Coat of arms of Lempäälä	Lempäälä	25,041	270	93	96 %	0.3 %	3 %
Coat of arms of Nokia	Nokia	36,571	288	127	95 %	0.3 %	4 %
Coat of arms of Orivesi	Orivesi	8,858	800	11	97 %	0.1 %	3 %
Coat of arms of Pirkkala	Pirkkala	21,373	81	263	95 %	0.4 %	5 %
Coat of arms of Tampere	Tampere	263,337	525	502	88 %	0.5 %	12 %
Coat of arms of Vesilahti	Vesilahti	4,532	301	15	97 %	0.4 %	2 %
Coat of arms of Ylöjärvi	Ylöjärvi	33,658	1,116	30	96 %	0.4 %	3 %
	Total	427,749	4,039	106	91 %	0.4 %	9 %

== See also ==
- Helsinki metropolitan area
- Turku metropolitan area
