= Taavetti Kalliokorpi =

Finnish politician

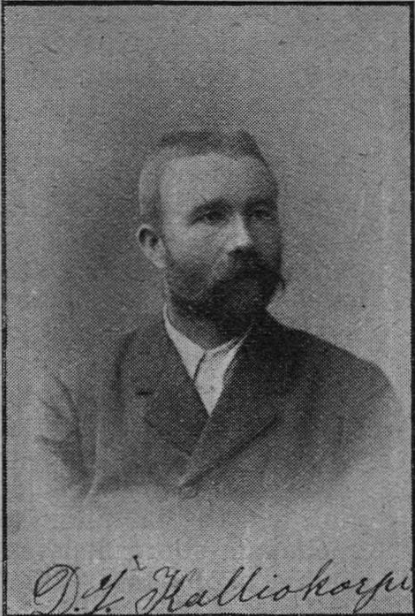
Taavetti Jeremias

Taavetti Jeremias Kalliokorpi (25 July 1869, Hämeenkyrö - 5 April 1949) was a Finnish farmer and politician. He was a member of the Parliament of Finland from 1907 to 1908, representing the Social Democratic Party of Finland (SDP).
