= Tampere sub-region =

Coordinates: 61.5005°N 23.7667°E

Tampere sub-region Tampereen seutukunta SK064 Tampere
- Sub-region
- Country: Finland
- Region: Pirkanmaa
- Capital: Tampere

Population
  - Total: 446,123
- Time zone: UTC+2 (EET)
  - Summer (DST): UTC+3 (EEST)

Tampere sub-region is a subdivision of Pirkanmaa in Finland. It is the second most populous sub-region in Finland with about 446,000 inhabitants after the Helsinki sub-region. The sub-regions are used for statistical purposes. Statistics Finland uses the term Tampere sub-region as SK064 Tampere.

The Tampere sub-region differs from the Tampere metropolitan area (Greater Tampere), which does not include the municipalities of Hämeenkyrö, Kuhmoinen and Pälkäne. The metropolitan area has a population of about 428,000.

== Municipalities ==
Coat of arms	Municipality	Population	Land area (km^{2})	Density (/km^{2})	Finnish speakers	Swedish speakers	Other speakers
Coat of arms of Hämeenkyrö	Hämeenkyrö	10,249	464	22	98 %	0.2 %	2 %
Coat of arms of Kangasala	Kangasala	34,379	658	52	96 %	0.3 %	4 %
Coat of arms of Kuhmoinen	Kuhmoinen	1,979	661	3	97 %	0 %	2 %
Coat of arms of Lempäälä	Lempäälä	25,041	270	93	96 %	0.3 %	3 %
Coat of arms of Nokia	Nokia	36,571	288	127	95 %	0.3 %	4 %
Coat of arms of Orivesi	Orivesi	8,858	800	11	97 %	0.1 %	3 %
Coat of arms of Pirkkala	Pirkkala	21,373	81	263	95 %	0.4 %	5 %
Coat of arms of Pälkäne	Pälkäne	6,146	561	11	96 %	0.3 %	4 %
Coat of arms of Tampere	Tampere	263,337	525	502	88 %	0.5 %	12 %
Coat of arms of Vesilahti	Vesilahti	4,532	301	15	97 %	0.4 %	2 %
Coat of arms of Ylöjärvi	Ylöjärvi	33,658	1,116	30	96 %	0.4 %	3 %
	Total	446,123	5,724	78	91 %	0.4 %	9 %

== See also ==
- Helsinki sub-region
- Turku sub-region
