= Tapani Koivuniemi =

Finnish engineer and publisher best known for leading a secretive Christian movement

Tapani Koivuniemi (born Hämeenkyrö, Finland, 1 November 1960) is a Finnish engineer and founder of the Koivuniemi Publishing House. Koivuniemi began studies in wood processing engineering at Helsinki University of Technology in 1981.

On 9 September 2009 Finnish TV company YLE broadcast a documentary “Koivuniemen herra” [a pun, meaning both “lord of Koivuniemi” and “Corporal punishment”] revealing that Koivuniemi was the leader of a secretive religious group called “Maanantaipiiri” (‘Monday circle’). In December 2010 the Finnish newspaper Helsingin Sanomat also included a feature article revealing the activities of the group.

== Maanantaipiiri and Maitobaari ==
The exposés on YLE and in the Helsingin Sanomat were based on interviews with ex-members of the group, as well as tens of hours of tape recordings of Koivuniemi’s “teachings” that had originally been made available to the inner circle of members. The group first started as a “Bible reading study group” in Koivuniemi’s own room in the student village of Helsinki University of Technology. The name “Maanantaipiiri” (‘Monday circle’) came about on account that they met each Monday, in the evening. Later, as the group grew, it - together with one of its sub-groups, Maitobaari - rented a space at the Lutheran parish centre in Olari, Espoo, though they were later expelled from the building, parish employees calling them an "unhealthy circle". The majority of those attending the group were university students. Over the years, while Koivuniemi remained at the university carrying out post-graduate studies and research at the nearby VTT Technical Research Centre of Finland the ‘circle’ grew into a secret religious group, with different hierarchical sections involved in different aspects: Maanantaipiiri, Maitobaari (Milk bar), Puutarha (Garden) and Torni (Tower). The Maitobaari was at first an open, though unregistered, religious group for young people; though the premise behind it was to recruit young people for the higher parts of the organisation.

Since the founding of the organisation, its members have grown to over 50. There have been marriages within the group members, the total number of children amongst members is in the tens. The raising of children within the group has been given special attention. The oldest of the children have reached university age. The youngest children are home-schooled. The families live close to each other in Espoo and Kirkkonummi. On directions from Koivuniemi, the women in the group take a submissive role (they are forbidden to speak in meetings) and dress in a feminine way (originally with make up, though his policy later changed and make-up was discouraged) and with long hair. The men dress soberly and mostly grow a beard. Koivuniemi also introduced a "weight-losing" programme among the members, which would follow the Body mass index; a number of women later reported that the strictly controlled weight-control programme by the group led some of them, even pregnant women, to anorexia. Koivuniemi believes in a close reading of the Bible. In the aftermath of the stories published in the press, it was revealed that the Lutheran Church was appalled at the "spiritual counselling" offered by the elders of the group, which included the young members having to give detailed descriptions of their private life.

== Koivuniemi Publishing House ==
The article in Helsingin Sanomat also revealed the workings of the Koivuniemi Publishing House founded by Tapani Koivuniemi in 1999. As the members of the cult were highly educated people, mostly from Helsinki University of Technology, the expertise was available to found a company dealing with various aspects of publishing and IT technology. The company web site gives the appearance of a normal publishing company – though there is no postal address for any offices - and indeed, listed among their clients are British Airways, the Finnish taxation authority, the City of Espoo, and Kela (The Finnish social security authority). The employees in fact work from their own homes. The article also depicted the working conditions of the employees: long hours with relatively low pay compared to other similar companies. According to one employee, “In Tapani’s opinion 300 hours [per month – i.e. 75 per week] would be good.”
