= Helsinki capital region =

Capital region of Finland

Helsinki capital region pääkaupunkiseutu – huvudstadsregion
- Capital region
- The capital region marked on the map in dark blue. Light blue covers the rest of metropolitan area.
- Capital region: Finland
- Region: Uusimaa
- Sub-region: Helsinki sub-region
- Metropolitan area: Helsinki metropolitan area
- Seat: Helsinki

Area
  - Land: 771 km^{2} (298 sq mi)

Population (2025-12-31)
  - Total: 1,283,382
  - Density: 1,664/km^{2} (4,310/sq mi)

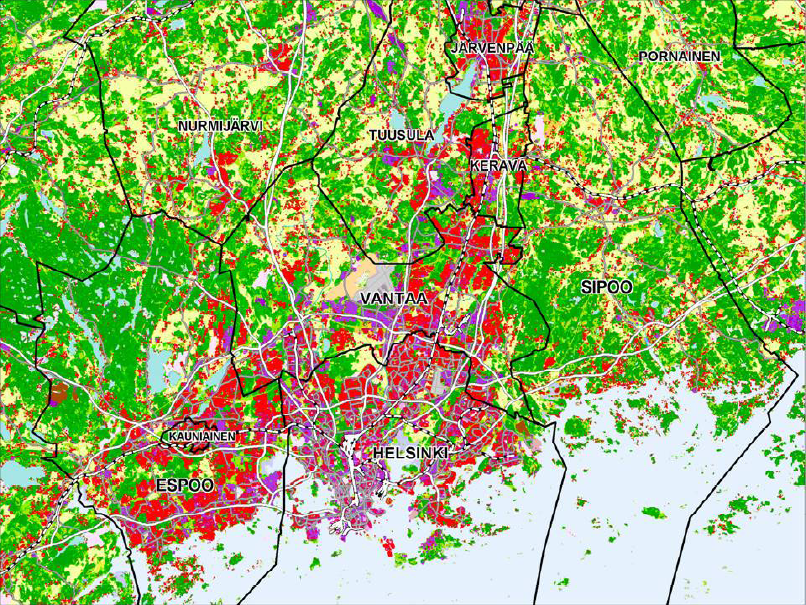
A map about land use structure in the capital region.

The Helsinki capital region (Finnish: pääkaupunkiseutu, Swedish: huvudstadsregion) is the area formed by the cities of Espoo, Helsinki, Kauniainen and Vantaa in Finland. (Note: In the association of municipalities and other official municipal contexts, the capital region includes the following four cities: Helsinki, Espoo, Kauniainen and Vantaa. (by Institute for the language of Finland)) The area is limited around Helsinki, the capital of Finland. The area is located in the southern part of Finland on the shores of the Gulf of Finland and is an important growth centre with a population of 1.3 million.

The municipalities of the capital region have a legal obligation to cooperate in the areas of waste management and public transport, with HSL being responsible for public transport and HSY for waste management and water supply. Municipalities other than the four capital region municipalities may also be members of the association of municipalities. HSL has Kirkkonummi, Kerava, Tuusula, Sipoo from the Helsinki metropolitan area and Siuntio from outside the area, and Kirkkonummi for the waste management of HSY.

== Other definitions ==
Sometimes the term Greater Helsinki (Finnish: Suur-Helsinki) has been used in the same sense as the Capital region, but not in the official language. The term Capital region is already established in both official and unofficial use.

The term Helsinki metropolitan area (Finnish: Helsingin seutu) may be broader than the capital region in common parlance, but it also has a precise meaning in the official language. For example, when the term Helsinki metropolitan area is used in statistics, it includes 14 municipalities, namely Helsinki, Espoo, Kauniainen, Vantaa, Kirkkonummi, Vihti, Nurmijärvi, Tuusula, Kerava, Järvenpää, Hyvinkää, Mäntsälä, Pornainen and Sipoo.

The Helsinki sub-region (Finnish: Helsingin seutukunta), which is related to the national regional division that was abolished at the beginning of 2014, must be distinguished from the Helsinki metropolitan area. The Helsinki sub-region included some of the same municipalities as the Helsinki Metropolitan Area, with the addition of Lohja, Karkkila and Siuntio.

== Municipalities ==
| Coat of arms | Municipality | Population | Land area (km^{2}) | Density (/km^{2}) | Finnish speakers | Swedish speakers | Other speakers |
|---|---|---|---|---|---|---|---|
| Coat of arms of Espoo | Espoo | 325,716 | 312 | 1,043 | 68 % | 6 % | 26 % |
| Coat of arms of Helsinki | Helsinki | 694,392 | 214 | 3,238 | 73 % | 5 % | 21 % |
| Coat of arms of Kauniainen | Kauniainen | 10,318 | 6 | 1,752 | 59 % | 30 % | 11 % |
| Coat of arms of Vantaa | Vantaa | 252,956 | 238 | 1,061 | 68 % | 2 % | 30 % |
| | Total | 1,283,382 | 771 | 1,664 | 71 % | 5 % | 24 % |
