= Hämeenkyrö =

Hämeenkyrö Tavastkyro
- Municipality
- Hämeenkyrön kunta Tavastkyro kommun
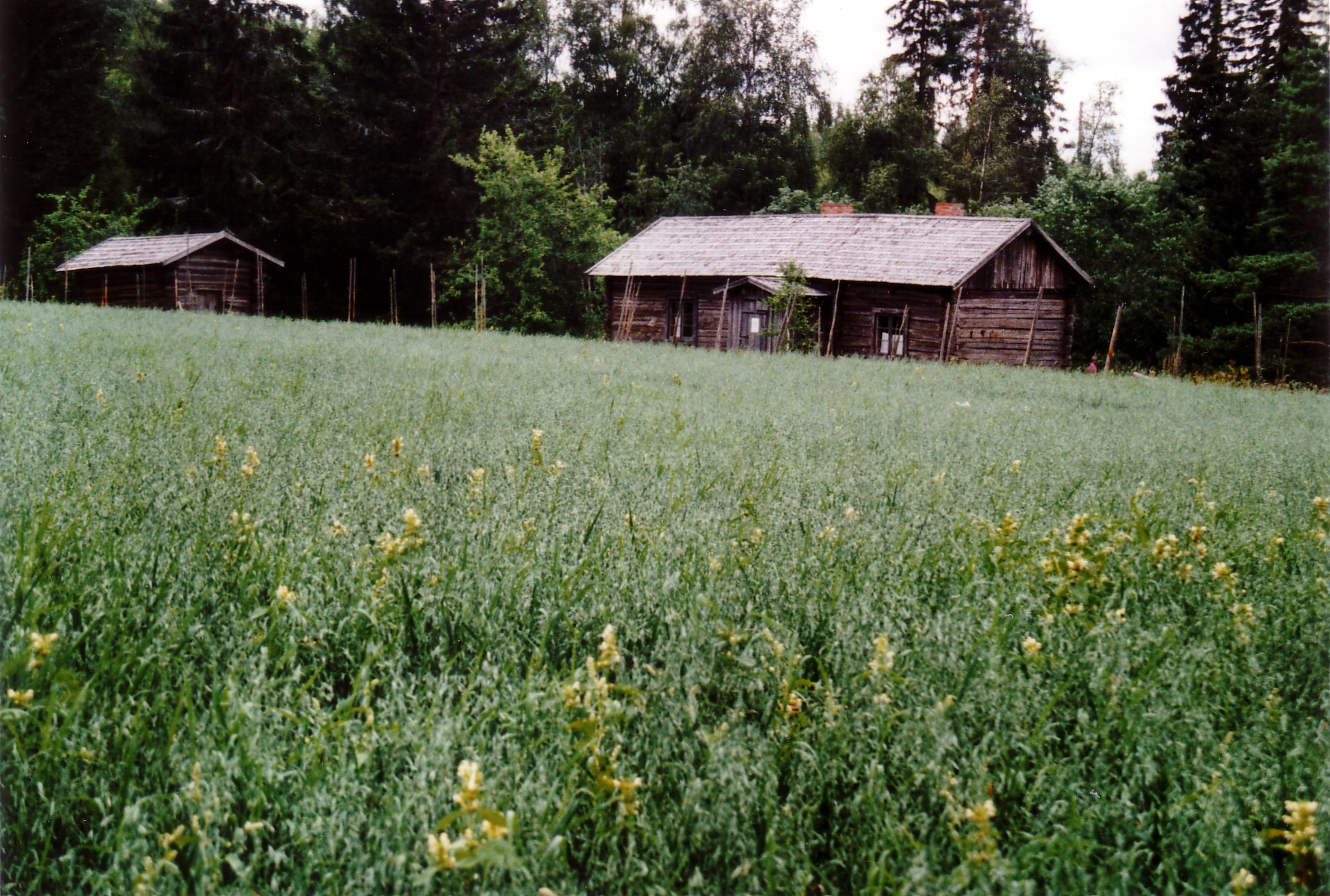
- The birth-place of Finnish Nobel laureate F. E. Sillanpää

- Coat of arms

- Location of Hämeenkyrö in Finland
- Interactive map of Hämeenkyrö
- Coordinates: 61°38′N 023°12′E
- Country: Finland
- Region: Pirkanmaa
- Sub-region: Tampere

Government
  - Municipality manager: Antero Alenius

Area (2018-01-01)
  - Total: 505.10 km^{2} (195.02 sq mi)
  - Land: 463.99 km^{2} (179.15 sq mi)
  - Water: 41.34 km^{2} (15.96 sq mi)
  - Rank: 187th largest in Finland

Population (2025-12-31)
  - Total: 10,249
  - Rank: 93rd largest in Finland
  - Density: 22.09/km^{2} (57.2/sq mi)

Population by native language
  - Finnish: 97.7% (official)
  - Swedish: 0.2%
  - Others: 2.2%

Population by age
  - 0 to 14: 16.9%
  - 15 to 64: 58.7%
  - 65 or older: 24.4%
- Time zone: UTC+02:00 (EET)
  - Summer (DST): UTC+03:00 (EEST)
- Website: hameenkyro.fi

Hämeenkyrö (Finnish: [ˈhæmeːnˌkyrø]; Swedish: Tavastkyro) is a municipality of Finland. It is part of the Pirkanmaa region, and is located 36 kilometres (22 mi) from Tampere. The municipality has a population of 10,249 (31 December 2025) and covers an area of 505.10 square kilometres (195.02 sq mi) of which 41.34 km^{2} (15.96 sq mi) is water. The population density is 22.09 inhabitants per square kilometre (57.2/sq mi).

The neighboring municipalities of Hämeenkyrö are Ikaalinen, Nokia, Sastamala and Ylöjärvi. The municipality is unilingually Finnish.

The drinking horn depicting coat of arms of Hämeenkyrö was designed by Gustaf von Numers and it was confirmed in 1954. After the wars, the evacuated Karelian population from Otradnoye (Pyhäjärvi) was mostly settled in Hämeenkyrö.

Results of the 2021 Finnish municipal elections, resulted in the True Finns being the largest group on the Hämeenkyrö council, in Hämeenkyrö.

The name Hämeenkyrö comes from Finnish words "Häme" and "kyrö", which together mean a craggy and thicketed area located in the Tavastia region.

== Transport ==
The private coach company OnniBus route Helsinki—Seinäjoki—Vaasa has a stop at Hämeenkyrö.

== Distances from Hämeenkyrö ==
- Helsinki 220 km
- Nokia 30 km
- Pori 95 km
- Tampere 40 km
- Lahti 150 km
- Turku 155 km
- Vaasa 200 km
- Oulu 390 km
- Rovaniemi 555 km
- Stockholm 375 km
- Tallinn 260 km
- St. Petersburg 430 km

== Notable people ==
- Taavetti Kalliokorpi (1869–1949), Finnish farmer and politician
- Tapani Koivuniemi (born 1960), Finnish engineer, business founder
- Jyri Niemi (born 1990), Finnish professional ice hockey defenceman
- Mirja Ojanen (born 1967), Finnish ski-orienteering competitor
- Hans Osara (c.1560–1601), Finnish lieutenant at the Cudgel War
- Frans Eemil Sillanpää (1888–1964), Finnish writer, Nobel Laureate in Literature
- Arvo Tuominen (1894–1981), Finnish journalist, politician and author
- Ilkka Tuomisto (born 1984), Finnish Paralympic cross-country skier and biathlete
- Iivari Yrjölä (1899–1985), Finnish athlete
- Matti Yrjölä (born 1938), Finnish shot putter
- Paavo Yrjölä (1902–1980), Finnish track and field athlete
