= Zahra Abdulla =

Somali-born Finnish politician

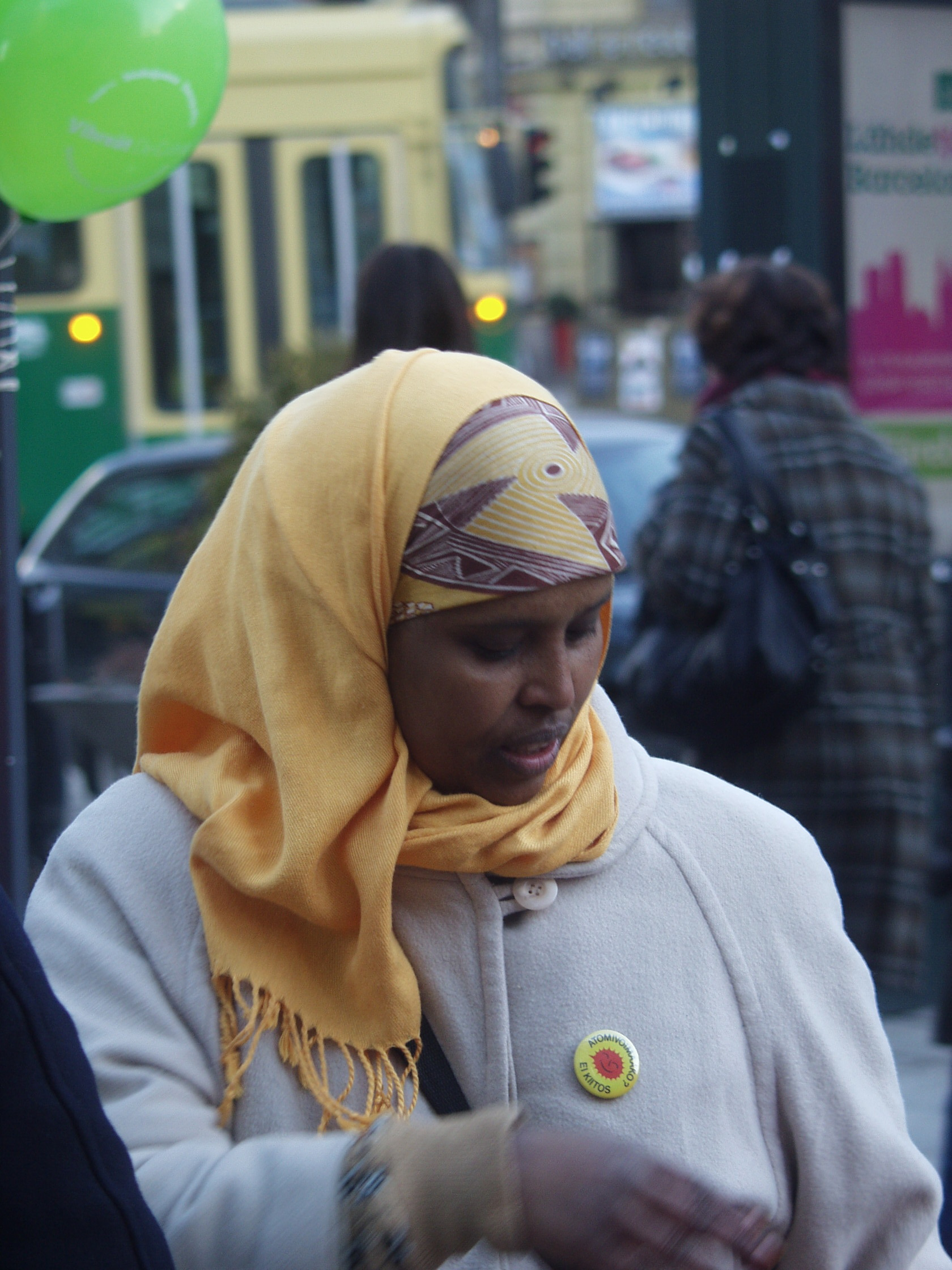

Helsinki City Council
- In office October 2008 – 2017

Personal details
- Born: 1966 (age 59–60) Somalia
- Party: Left Alliance formerly: Green League

Zahra Abdulla (Somali: Sahra Cabdulla, Arabic: زهراء عبد الله; born 1966) is a Somali-born Finnish politician. She was a member of the Helsinki City Council from 1997 to 2017, representing the Green League.

== Biography ==
Zahra was born in Somalia in 1966. She spent her early years in Egypt and Kenya. She later studied medicine in Moscow. However, the dissolution of the Soviet Union and the simultaneous breakout of the Somali Civil War in her native country forced her to apply for political asylum in neighboring Finland. She eventually received Finnish citizenship in 1998.

== Political career ==
Working for a time as a midwife, Zahra later moved on to a career in politics. In the Finnish parliamentary elections of 2007, she came close to becoming the first Somali immigrant to be elected to the Parliament of Finland. However, very near the end of the vote counting, she was beaten out by fellow Green League candidate Outi Alanko-Kahiluoto by only a few hundred votes (4586 vs. 4174).

In October of the following year, Zahra was elected to the Helsinki City Council with nearly 2,500 votes, "a large number of which were given in areas where immigrants hardly show up as a blip on the local population register." Reasons cited for Zahra's success in the elections were her high educational level, and considerable local support for the Green League.

In 2015 Zahra resigned from the Greens' council group, faced claims that her and Sirkku Ingervo's departure from the party was due to Ingervo's disappointment in the group's internal elections. In the 2015 Finnish parliamentary election, she supported Veronika Honkasalo from the Left Alliance.
