= Viljakkala =

Former municipality in Pirkanmaa, Finland

Coordinates: 61°42′20″N 023°16′00″E

'Viljakkala' is a former municipality of Finland.

It was located in the province of Western Finland and was part of the Pirkanmaa region. The municipality had a population of 2,043 (2003) and covered an area of 224.70 km^{2} of which 24.61 km^{2} was water. The population density was 10.2 inhabitants per km^{2}. Viljakkala was consolidated with Ylöjärvi on January 1, 2007.

The municipality was unilingually Finnish.
