= Raisio =

Raisio Reso
- Town
- Raision kaupunki Reso stad
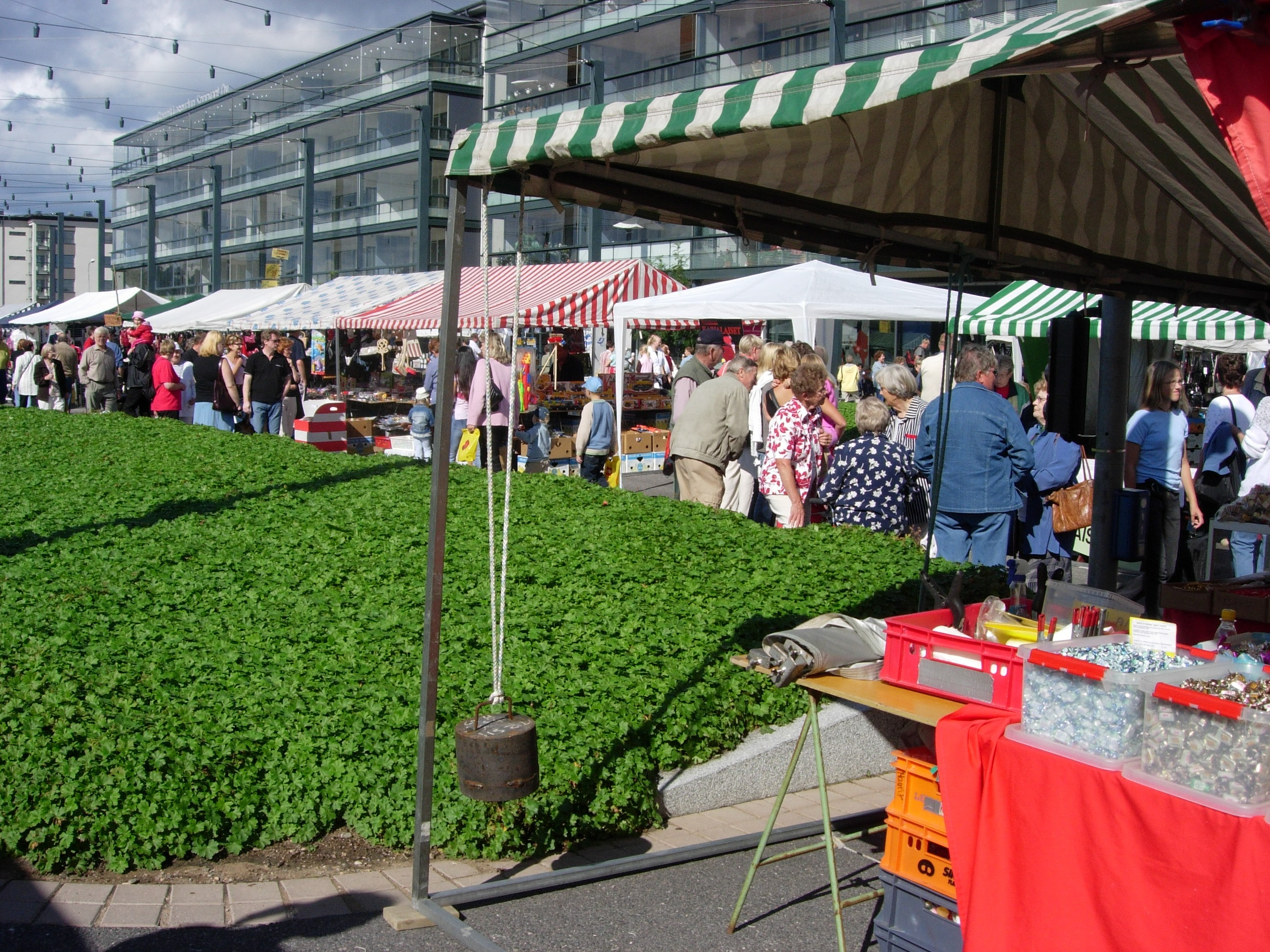
- Market place in Raisio

- Flag Coat of arms

- Location of Raisio in Finland
- Interactive map of Raisio
- Coordinates: 60°29′09″N 22°10′09″E
- Country: Finland
- Region: Southwest Finland
- Sub-region: Turku sub-region
- Metropolitan area: Turku metropolitan area
- First records: 1292
- City rights: 1974

Government
  - Town manager: Ari Korhonen

Area (2018-01-01)
  - Total: 50.06 km^{2} (19.33 sq mi)
  - Land: 48.76 km^{2} (18.83 sq mi)
  - Water: 1.3 km^{2} (0.50 sq mi)
  - Rank: 306th largest in Finland

Population (2025-12-31)
  - Total: 26,036
  - Rank: 40th largest in Finland
  - Density: 533.96/km^{2} (1,383.0/sq mi)

Population by native language
  - Finnish: 83.8% (official)
  - Swedish: 1.4%
  - Others: 14.8%

Population by age
  - 0 to 14: 15.6%
  - 15 to 64: 61.2%
  - 65 or older: 23.3%
- Time zone: UTC+02:00 (EET)
  - Summer (DST): UTC+03:00 (EEST)
- Climate: Dfb
- Website: raisio.fi/en

Raisio (Finnish: [ˈrɑi̯sio]; Swedish: Reso) is a town in Finland, located in the Southwest Finland region. It lies north of the regional capital, Turku. The population of Raisio is approximately 26,000, while the sub-region has a population of approximately 356,000. It is the 40th most populous municipality in Finland, and the third largest municipality in the Southwest Finland region after Turku and Kaarina.

The town of Raisio has a land area of 48.76 km^{2} (18.83 sq mi), and has about 5 kilometres (3 mi) of coastline to the Bay of Raisio at its southern tip.

The coat of arms of Raisio is inspired by Martin of Tours, the patron saint of the medieval stone church of Raisio parish. The coat of arms was designed by Olof Eriksson and approved for use on 23 April 1954.

== History ==
The oldest known written record of Raisio is from 1292, and there is strong evidence of Stone Age settlement in the area, but Raisio did not become a town until 1974. It was an agricultural area until the late 20th century. The success of the Raisio Group company transformed the town into an industrial centre and triggered a huge increase in population - during the 20th century the population of Raisio increased elevenfold. The town's existence was threatened by Turku city's plans to merge with Raisio. This changed after the Raisio Group became a successful company.

== Name ==
The name Raisio was originally given to the river Raisionjoki. The earliest form of the river's name is Raisajoki, which means "marsh/bog river", and etymological evidence for this can be found in the Estonian word raisnik, which means "mire". Another theory about the etymology of the name Raisio is that it comes from the word raiskio, meaning a forest damaged by poor forest management, as the Raisio landscape was altered by siltation and post-glacial uplift after the Ice Age.

== Politics ==
Results of the 2019 Finnish parliamentary election in Raisio:

- Social Democratic Party 23.9%
- True Finns 22.5%
- National Coalition Party 19.2%
- Left Alliance 13.2%
- Green League 7.2%
- Centre Party 6.7%
- Christian Democrats 2.1%
- Movement Now 1.8%
- Swedish People's Party 1.8%

== Economy ==
The town's location, with good transport links and close to the regional capital, has contributed greatly to its growth. Its main industries are services, food, and chemical production. The largest employer in the town is the Raisio Group, a manufacturer of food, animal feed, and health products.

Raisio is also home to the Mylly shopping centre, one of the largest shopping centres in the Nordic countries.

The town is home to the IKEA in Raisio, which was the third IKEA to open in Finland and is one of the five IKEA stores currently open in the country.

The biggest employers in Raisio:

Employer	Employees
City of Raisio (2023)	800
Raisiokeskus in total (2020)	500
Raisio Oyj (2020)	330
Ikea Raisio (2020)	190
Inhan Tehtaat Oy Ab (2021)	171
HIAB, Raisio (2020)	170
TYKS/Raisio hospital (2020)	150
Konepaja Häkkinen Oy (2021)	133
Kaukora Oy (2021)	127
Veho Oy ja Veho Group Oy (2020)	122
Bauhaus (2020)	100
TRP Group (2021)	99
Bunge Finland Oy (2021)	90
Tuulilasivarikko Oy (2021)	79
Varsinais-Suomen Auto-Center (2021)	74
Oy Martinex Ab (2021)	61
Raision Sähkö-insto Oy (2021)	60

== Points of interest ==
The town of Raisio has many cultural facilities, such as the Friisilä Handicraft Centre, which offers visitors an insight into traditional Finnish handicrafts. The Harkko Cultural Centre in the town centre includes an art museum, an archaeological museum and a theatre. The town library and the Ulpukka swimming centre are also worth a visit. Raisio is also home to Finland's largest secondary school, Vaisaaren yläkoulu.

Raisio railway station, located on the Turku-Uusikaupunki railway line, has been declared a built cultural environment of national significance by the Finnish Heritage Agency.

== Demographics ==
=== Population ===
The city of Raisio has 26,036 inhabitants, making it the 40th most populous municipality in Finland. The city of Raisio is part of the Turku region, which is the third largest urban area in Finland with 355,791 inhabitants.

Population size 1990–2025
Year	Population
1990	21,120
1995	22,268
2000	23,149
2005	23,799
2010	24,427
2015	24,290
2020	24,407
2025	26,036

=== Languages ===
Population by
mother tongue (2024)
1. Finnish (85.0%)
2. Ukrainian (2.20%)
3. Russian (2.20%)
4. Swedish (1.40%)
5. Albanian (1.30%)
6. Bosnian (0.90%)
7. Estonian (0.80%)
8. Other (6.20%)

Raisio is a monolingual Finnish-speaking municipality. As of 2024, the majority of the population, 21,818 persons (83.8%), spoke Finnish as their first language. In addition, the number of Swedish speakers was 367 persons (1.4%) of the population. Foreign languages were spoken by 14.8% of the population. As English and Swedish are compulsory school subjects, functional bilingualism or trilingualism acquired through language studies is not uncommon.

At least 30 different languages are spoken in Raisio. The most common foreign languages are Ukrainian (2.2%), Russian (2.2%), Albanian (1.3%) and Bosnian (0.9%).

=== Immigration ===
Population by country of birth (2025)
Country of birth	Population	%
Finland	22,533	86.5
Soviet Union	748	2.9
Ukraine	370	1.4
Yugoslavia	299	1.1
Estonia	223	0.9
Sweden	139	0.5
Iraq	129	0.5
Philippines	122	0.5
Poland	106	0.4
Iran	101	0.4
Other	1,266	4.9

As of 2024, there were 3,557 persons with a foreign background living in Raisio, or 14% of the population. (Note: Statistics Finland classifies a person as having a "foreign background" if both parents or the only known parent were born abroad.) The number of residents who were born abroad was 3,171, or 12% of the population. The number of persons with foreign citizenship living in Raisio was 2,296. Most foreign-born citizens came from the former Soviet Union, the former Yugoslavia, Ukraine and Estonia.

The relative share of immigrants in Raisio's population is above the national average. Moreover, the city's new residents are increasingly of foreign origin. This will increase the proportion of foreign residents in the coming years.

=== Religion ===
In 2023, the Evangelical Lutheran Church was the largest religious group with 62.1% of the population of Raisio. Other religious groups accounted for 2.9% of the population. 35.0% of the population had no religious affiliation.

== Notable residents ==
- Nils-Eric Fougstedt (1910–1961), conductor and composer
- Heikki Haavisto (1935–2022), politician and lobbyist
- Silja Kosonen (born 2002), hammer thrower
- Kalervo Kummola (born 1945), ice hockey executive, businessman, and politician
- Yrjö Nurmio (1901–1983), professor and director of the National Archives of Finland

== Twin towns – sister cities ==
Raisio is twinned with:

- Kingisepp, Russia
- Sigtuna, Sweden
- Csongrád, Hungary
- Elmshorn, Germany
