= Helsinki metropolitan area =

Metropolitan area in Uusimaa, Finland

Helsinki metropolitan area Helsingin seutu – Helsingforsregionen
- Metropolitan area
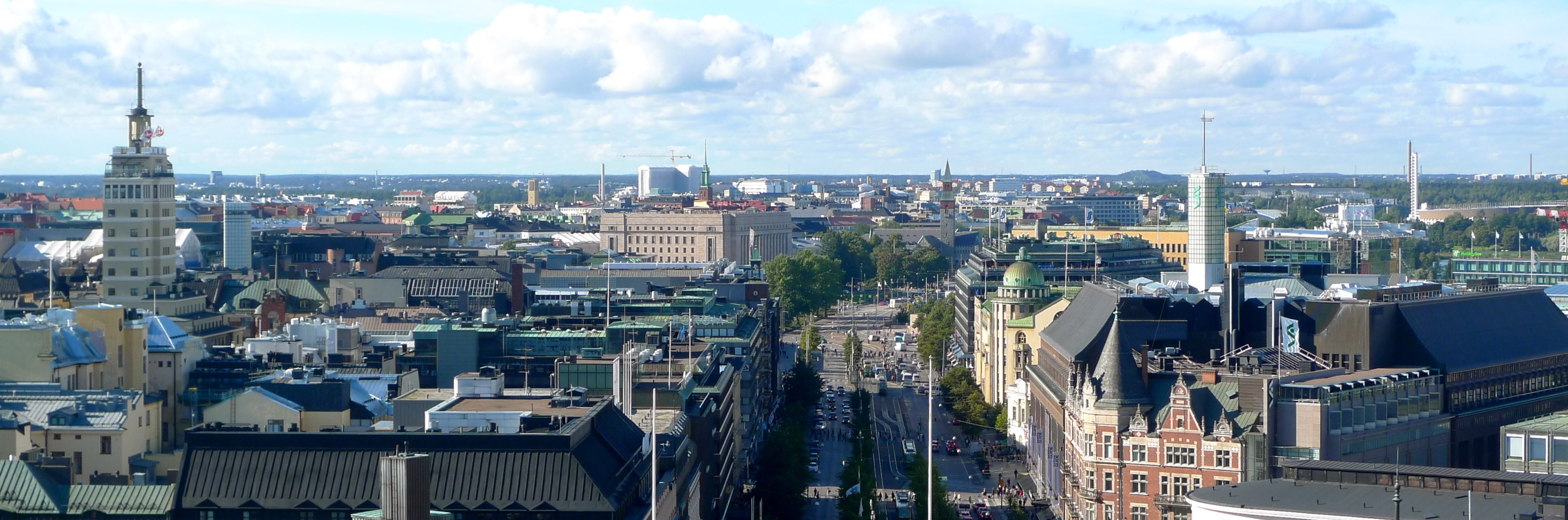
- Helsinki skyline

- Country: Finland
- Region: Uusimaa
- Sub-region: Helsinki sub-region
- Capital area: Helsinki capital region
- Seat: Helsinki

Area
  - Land: 3,698.99 km^{2} (1,428.19 sq mi)

Population (2025-12-31)
  - Total: 1,623,283
  - Density: 438.8/km^{2} (1,136/sq mi)

GDP
  - Metro: €105.831 billion (2022)
- Website: Helsinki Region Trends

Helsinki metropolitan area (Finnish: Helsingin seutu, Swedish: Helsingforsregionen) or Greater Helsinki (Finnish: Suur-Helsinki, Swedish: Storhelsingfors) is the metropolitan area around Helsinki, the capital city of Finland. It also includes the smaller capital region. The terms Helsinki metropolitan area, Greater Helsinki, Capital region and the other terms used are not fixed and may vary in different contexts.

The metropolitan region is the largest urbanised area in the country with a population of approximately 1.62 million (2025) and is by far the most important economic, cultural, and scientific region of Finland. Five of Finland's 14 universities, (Note: These are Aalto University, the University of Helsinki, the University of the Arts Helsinki, the Hanken School of Economics, and the National Defence University.) and six universities of applied sciences are located in the metropolitan area, as are most of the headquarters of major companies and government institutions. Finland's main airline hub and airport, Helsinki Airport, is located in the city of Vantaa.

These regions are located in the south of Finland, on the coast of the Gulf of Finland, which is a part of the Baltic Sea. They are also a part of the region of Uusimaa in Finland.

== Terminology ==
=== Capital Region ===
In the strictest sense, the Finnish capital region consists of four municipalities with city title, Helsinki, Vantaa, Espoo and Kauniainen. It has a population of about 1.28 million. This area is most often called the Capital region in English, Pääkaupunkiseutu in Finnish, and Huvudstadsregionen in Swedish, although the use of the terms is not especially consistent. The vast majority of the inhabitants live in the urban areas of the cities, but within the boundaries of these cities there are also suburban and rural areas.

=== Helsinki metropolitan area ===
The Helsinki metropolitan area includes around ten additional municipalities that can be considered commuter towns and exurbs of Helsinki. These municipalities are Hyvinkää, Järvenpää, Kerava, Kirkkonummi, Nurmijärvi, Sipoo, Tuusula, Mäntsälä, Pornainen and Vihti, bringing the total population to about 1.62 million. All of the municipalities belong to the region of Uusimaa. Of these, Järvenpää, Kerava, Tuusula, Nurmijärvi, Sipoo, Kirkkonummi, Mäntsälä and Vihti have parts of the urban area within them. Additionally, the cities of Porvoo, Lohja, Karkkila and to some extent Riihimäki, which have very close ties, motorway and, in the case of Riihimäki, commuter train accesses, and are fairly close to the capital, are nowadays often included in regional planning, which raises the total population to about 1.76 million.

=== Helsinki sub-region ===
Helsinki metropolitan area differs from the Helsinki sub-region (Finnish: Helsingin seutukunta), which also includes the municipalities of Karkkila, Lohja and Siuntio. The Helsinki sub-region is used for statistical purposes. It is based on cooperation between municipalities and the commuting area. The sub-region has a population of about 1.68 million.

=== Helsinki Region Cooperation Assembly ===
The Helsinki Region Cooperation Assembly is a cooperative body of the municipalities of the Helsinki Region, whose members are the leading elected representatives of the municipalities. Seventeen municipalities participate in cooperation in the Helsinki Region:

- Cities in the Helsinki Capital Area: (Note: The official Finnish and Swedish conventions use the term "capital" (Finnish: pääkaupunkiseudun kaupungit, Swedish: huvudstadsregionens städer), although the unofficial English translation uses the term "metropolitan".) Helsinki, Espoo, Vantaa and Kauniainen.
- The "KUUMA municipalities": Järvenpää, Nurmijärvi, Tuusula, Kerava, Mäntsälä, Pornainen, Hyvinkää, Kirkkonummi, Vihti and Sipoo.
- Partnership municipalities: Porvoo, Lohja and Siuntio.

The common goal of the participating municipalities is to develop cooperation and advocacy. The cooperation is based on the common vision of the municipalities in the Helsinki region regarding the challenges facing the region and the common will to contribute to the development of the region.

=== Other definitions ===
As a part of the urban audit project, Eurostat has attempted to standardise the concept of a 'metropolitan area'. According to this study the Metropolitan area of Helsinki consists of the kernel of Helsinki: Helsinki, Espoo, Vantaa, and Kauniainen. The Helsinki Larger Urban Area (Helsingin seutu in Finnish) consists of 12 cities and municipalities: the kernel of Helsinki and the aforementioned eight municipalities.

Statistics Finland define the commuter belt of Helsinki (Helsingin työssäkäyntialue, Helsingfors pendlingsområde) to include a total of 27 municipalities and a population of 1.81 million. In addition to that, there are people from as far as Lahti and even Tampere commuting to Helsinki daily.

Statistics Finland also defines the Helsinki urban area according to the official Finnish definition of an urban area (taajama in Finnish). Urban areas in Finland are defined as inhabited areas of at least 200 people with a maximum distance of 200 metres (660 ft) between buildings. The Helsinki urban area is the largest of its kind in Finland, and encompasses land throughout metropolitan area, with notable gaps around forests and other less-densely populated areas.

The commuter towns of Lohja and Porvoo are not usually included to the Helsinki metropolitan area, though, if they were (considering their proximity to Helsinki and their high commuting rate), they would raise the overall population almost two million people. Hyvinkää, Järvenpää, Nurmijärvi, Tuusula, Mäntsälä and Pornainen, which have been designated as municipalities in Central Uusimaa in recent decades, have shown clear population growth due to their urban but also loose rural environment. These are also known as the "KUUMA municipalities".

== Municipalities ==
Coat of arms	Municipality	Population	Land area (km^{2})	Density (/km^{2})	Finnish speakers	Swedish speakers	Other speakers
Coat of arms of Espoo	Espoo	325,716	312	1,043	68 %	6 %	26 %
Coat of arms of Helsinki	Helsinki	694,392	214	3,238	73 %	5 %	21 %
Coat of arms of Hyvinkää	Hyvinkää	47,015	323	146	90 %	1 %	9 %
Coat of arms of Järvenpää	Järvenpää	46,944	38	1,251	89 %	1 %	10 %
Coat of arms of Kauniainen	Kauniainen	10,318	6	1,752	59 %	30 %	11 %
Coat of arms of Kerava	Kerava	38,767	31	1,266	81 %	1 %	18 %
Coat of arms of Kirkkonummi	Kirkkonummi	41,725	367	114	72 %	14 %	13 %
Coat of arms of Mäntsälä	Mäntsälä	20,861	581	36	93 %	1 %	6 %
Coat of arms of Nurmijärvi	Nurmijärvi	45,333	362	125	90 %	1 %	8 %
Coat of arms of Pornainen	Pornainen	4,919	147	34	94 %	2 %	4 %
Coat of arms of Sipoo	Sipoo	23,006	340	68	65 %	27 %	8 %
Coat of arms of Tuusula	Tuusula	42,479	220	193	90 %	1 %	9 %
Coat of arms of Vantaa	Vantaa	252,956	238	1,061	68 %	2 %	30 %
Coat of arms of Vihti	Vihti	28,852	522	55	91 %	2 %	8 %
	Total	1,623,283	3,699	438.8	75 %	5 %	21 %

== Economy ==
In 2020, Helsinki's gross metropolitan product was valued at €94.2 billion (US$100 billion). This puts Helsinki in 23rd place among metropolitan regions in the European Union.

== See also ==
- Helsinki Metropolitan Area Libraries
- Turku metropolitan area
- Tampere metropolitan area
- List of metropolitan areas in Europe
- List of urban areas in the Nordic countries
- List of urban areas in the European Union
