= Turku metropolitan area =

Metropolitan area in Southwest Finland, Finland

Turku metropolitan area Turun kaupunkiseutu – Åbo stadsregion
- Metropolitan area
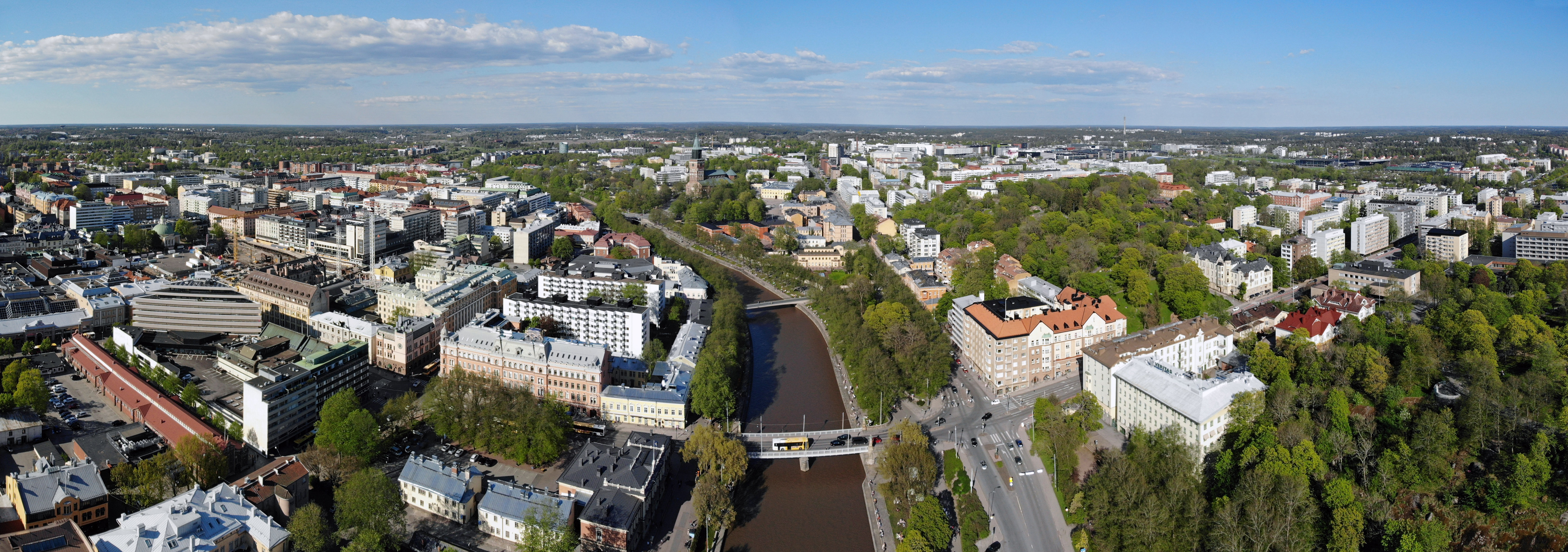
- Turku skyline

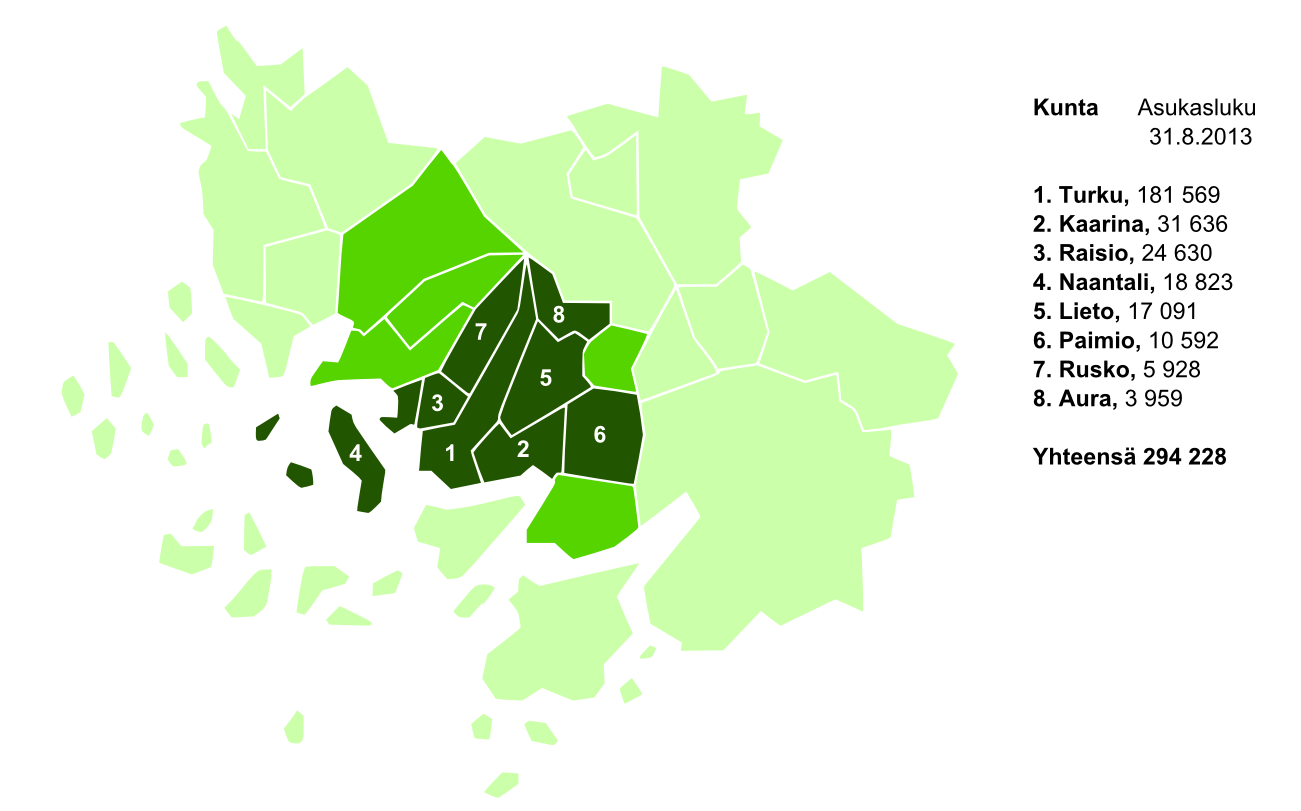
- Country: Finland
- Region: Southwest Finland
- Sub-region: Turku sub-region
- Seat: Turku

Area
  - Land: 1,185.24 km^{2} (457.62 sq mi)

Population (2025-12-31)
  - Total: 319,847
  - Density: 269.9/km^{2} (699/sq mi)

GDP
  - Total: €20.0 billion (2021)
- Website: turunseutu.fi

Turku metropolitan area or Turku region (Finnish: Turun seutu, Swedish: Åbo region) is the metropolitan area around the city of Turku in Finland. The joint municipal authority of the Turku city region (Finnish: Turun kaupunkiseutu, Swedish: Åbo stadsregion) consists of six municipalities: Turku, Kaarina, Lieto, Naantali, Raisio and Rusko. The Turku metropolitan area forms a compact, urban-like regional growth centre where people commute from a relatively large area of the Southwest Finland region.

The Turku metropolitan area has a population of about 320,000, making it the third largest region in Finland after Helsinki and Tampere. The terms Turku metropolitan area, Turku region, Turku city region, Greater Turku and the other terms used are not fixed and may vary in different contexts.

Turku metropolitan area differs from the Turku sub-region (Finnish: Turun seutukunta), which also includes the municipalities of Masku, Mynämäki, Nousiainen, Paimio and Sauvo. The Turku sub-region is used for statistical purposes. It is based on cooperation between municipalities and the commuting area. The sub-region has a population of about 356,000.

Turku metropolitan area has two universities and three universities of applied sciences. Finland's largest bio-industrial cluster of research and companies is located in Turku. There are also ICT concentrations in the cities of Turku and Salo. The Turku metropolitan area is located on the Baltic Sea coast with its logistical activities. The region's two seaports, the Port of Turku and the Port of Naantali, and the shipbuilding industry are major employers in the area. Turku Airport has logistics industries for sea, air, rail and road freight.

== Geography ==
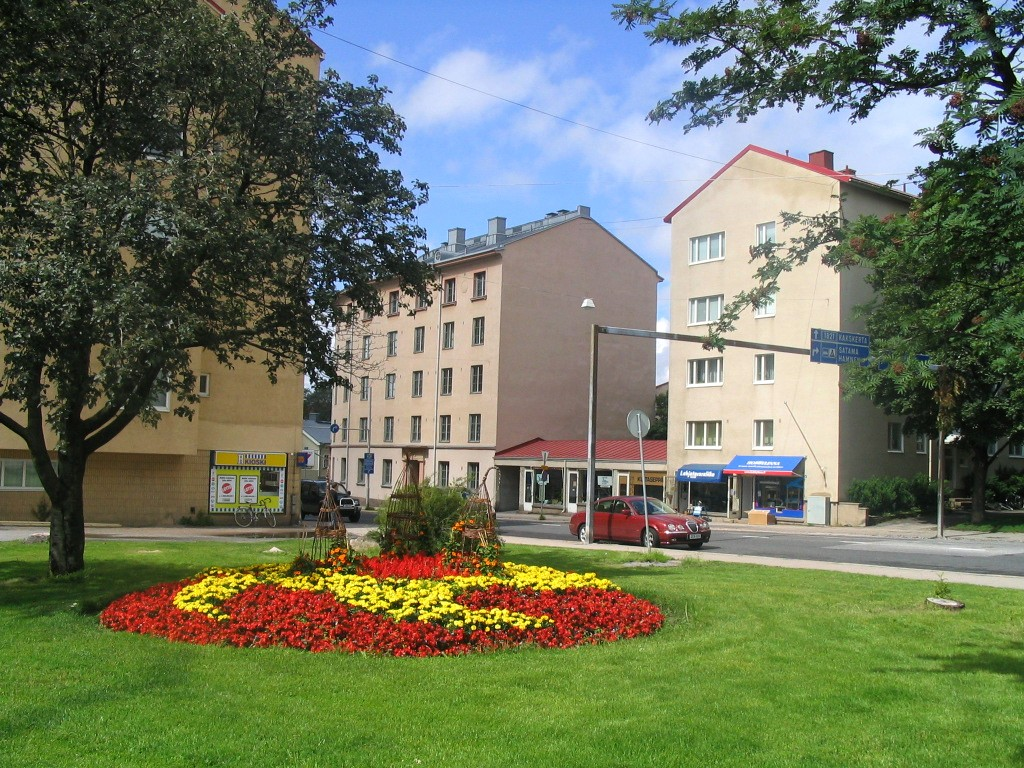
Park in the Martti district of Turku

The Turku region is located in the southwestern corner of Finland around the city of Turku. It is part of the region of Southwest Finland and Western Finland. It is bordered by the Salo sub-region to the east, the Loimaa sub-region to the northeast, Vakka-Suomi to the north and Åboland to the southwest. The Turku region has part of the Archipelago Sea with its various islands to the southwest.

The Turku city region consists of four major cities. Turku in the centre, Naantali and Raisio in the west and Kaarina in the east. The coastline is occupied by two seaports, one of Naantali and one of Turku. All four cities are connected to the Turku Ring Road and the Kaarinantie road. There are also connections to the E18 and E63 motorways and national roads 1, 8, 9 and 10. Turku Airport is located north of the city and the ring road, and its area is partly shared between Rusko and Turku. Northeast of the airport, the city region ends and the Finnish interior with its forests and countryside begins.

As a large part of the region lies in the Archipelago Sea, there are several islands in the area and some of the municipalities, such as Rymättylä, are entirely on islands. The Turku city region has some of the most notable islands in the Archipelago Sea, such as Luonnonmaa in Naantali, Hirvensalo, Kakskerta and Ruissalo in Turku, and Kuusisto in Kaarina. The islands are not very populated, except for Hirvensalo in Turku, which is very close to the city centre. Most of the islands are covered by forests, but there are also fields close to the mainland.

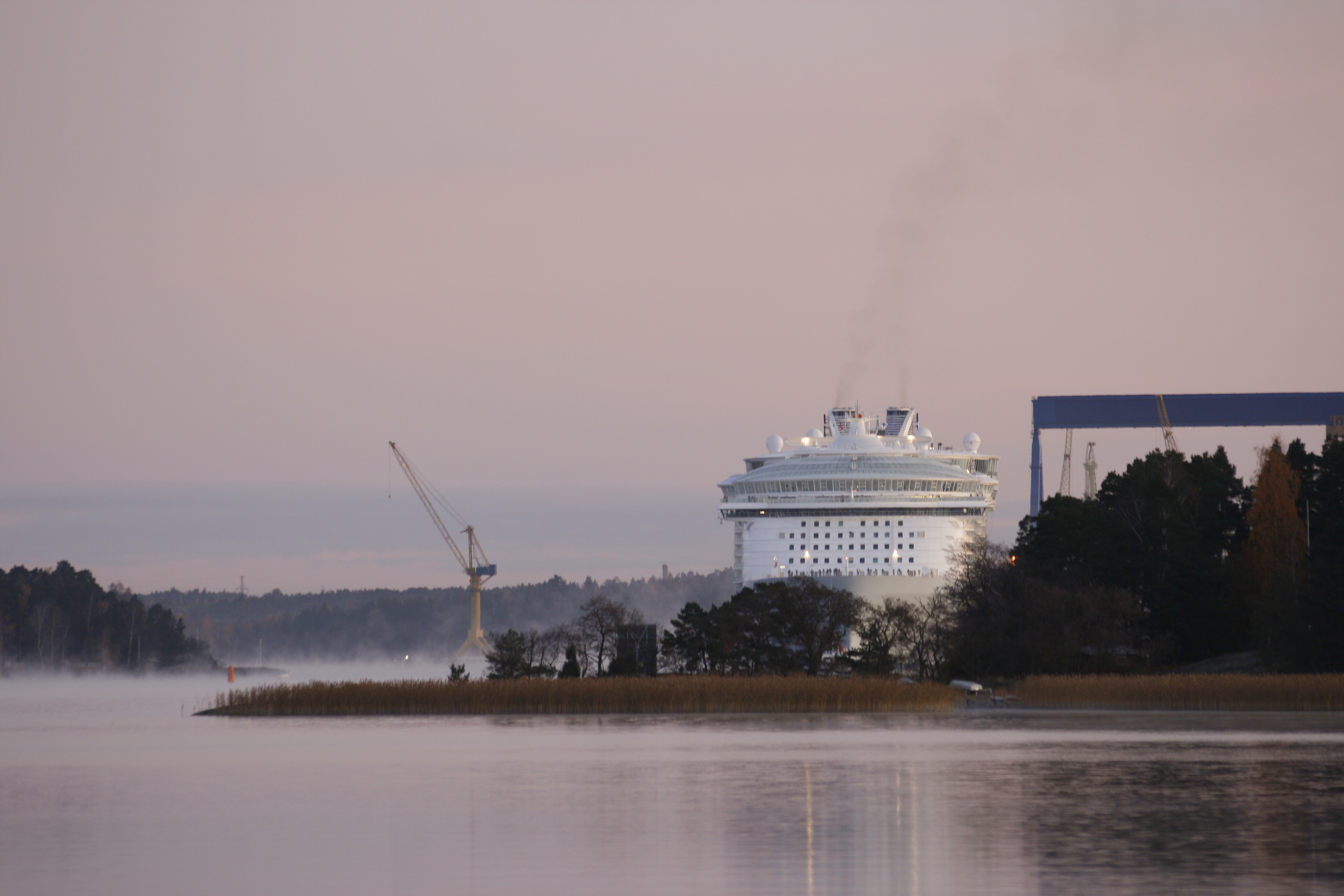
Oasis of the Seas leaving the shipyard, Turku.

Most of the water in the Turku region is concentrated in the Archipelago Sea, but there are also several lakes and reservoirs, some of which are located on the islands. The sea is mostly narrow straits between islands. Most of the water is quite shallow, but the main sea routes can be used by the world's largest cruise ships, some of which are built at the Turku shipyard.

The mainland is full of small hills, valleys and river valleys. The hills are often rocky, like the islands of the archipelago, and in fact these hills used to be part of the archipelago just after the Ice Age, but they rose from the sea and were connected to the mainland. Some of the hills were used as watchtowers in the days of the Vikings, who raided villages along the Baltic Sea. When the sentries spotted the Vikings, they would light an alarm fire on the top of the hill so that other sentry hills in the row would see it and light their own fire. One of these hills is Vartiovuori in Turku, which actually means "Guardian Hill". The river valleys have always been places of settlement, safe from the open sea and yet close and connected to it. When the valleys aren't inhabited, they are usually occupied by grain fields.

== Urbanization ==
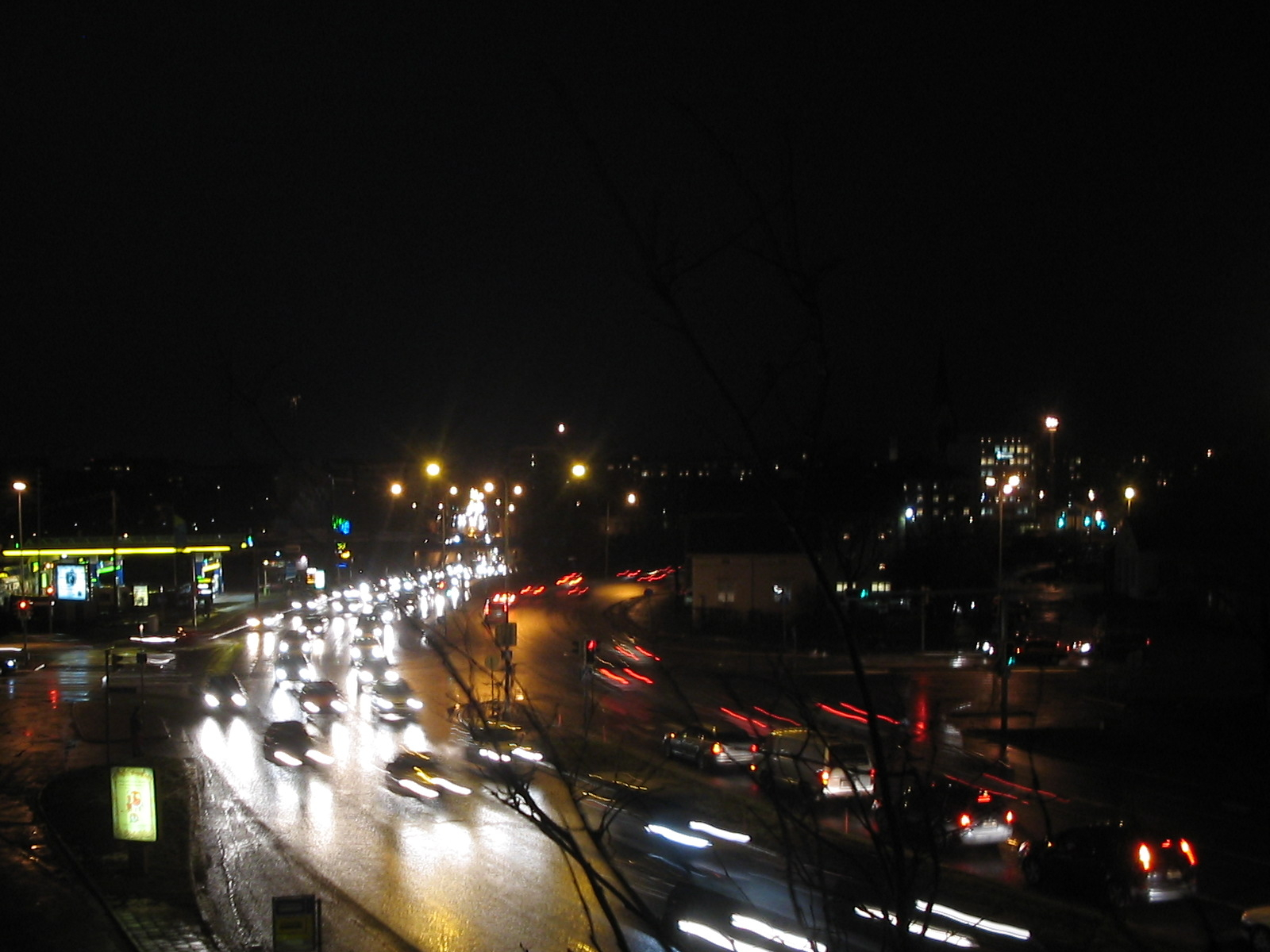
Naantalin pikatie splits in two before the city center. Road connects Raisio and Naantali to Turku and to east-side of the region.

The majority of the population of the Turku metropolitan area lives within the ring roads. The population density is quite high. Outside the city region, the population density drops sharply and urbanisation is more concentrated and surrounded by the countryside. Although the Turku metropolitan area as a whole has a low population density, it is worth noting that there are large unpopulated areas within the city limits, where activity and population are actually more concentrated. These more densely populated areas do not only exist in Turku, but also in four cities from Naantali to Kaarina.

The heart of the region is the Market Square in the centre of Turku. The city centre is quite small and concentrated, comprising only 4 to 5 km^{2} blocks. Small and sprawling neighbourhoods surrounding the city centre were built around the 50s and 60s, along with more modern buildings. Further away from the city centre (about 5 to 10 km) are the larger suburbs and neighbourhoods, which may have their own centres. There are also several large shopping centres.

The bus network is the only form of public transport in the Turku city region, although there have been discussions and preliminary decisions about reinstating a light rail system in the 2030s.

== Municipalities ==
Coat of arms	Municipality	Population	Land area (km^{2})	Density (/km^{2})	Finnish speakers	Swedish speakers	Other speakers
Coat of arms of Kaarina	Kaarina	36,675	151	244	88 %	5 %	7 %
Coat of arms of Lieto	Lieto	20,732	301	69	94 %	2 %	5 %
Coat of arms of Naantali	Naantali	20,390	313	65	94 %	1 %	5 %
Coat of arms of Raisio	Raisio	26,036	49	534	84 %	1 %	15 %
Coat of arms of Rusko	Rusko	6,381	127	50	95 %	2 %	3 %
Coat of arms of Turku	Turku	209,633	246	853	77 %	5 %	18 %
	Total	319,847	1,185	270	81 %	4 %	14 %

== See also ==
- Helsinki metropolitan area
- Tampere metropolitan area
