= Statistics Finland =

National statistics agency of Finland

- Finnish: Tilastokeskus; Swedish: Statistikcentralen

Agency overview
- Formed: October 4, 1865; 160 years ago
- Employees: c. 800
- Agency executive: Markus Sovala
- Website: stat.fi/en

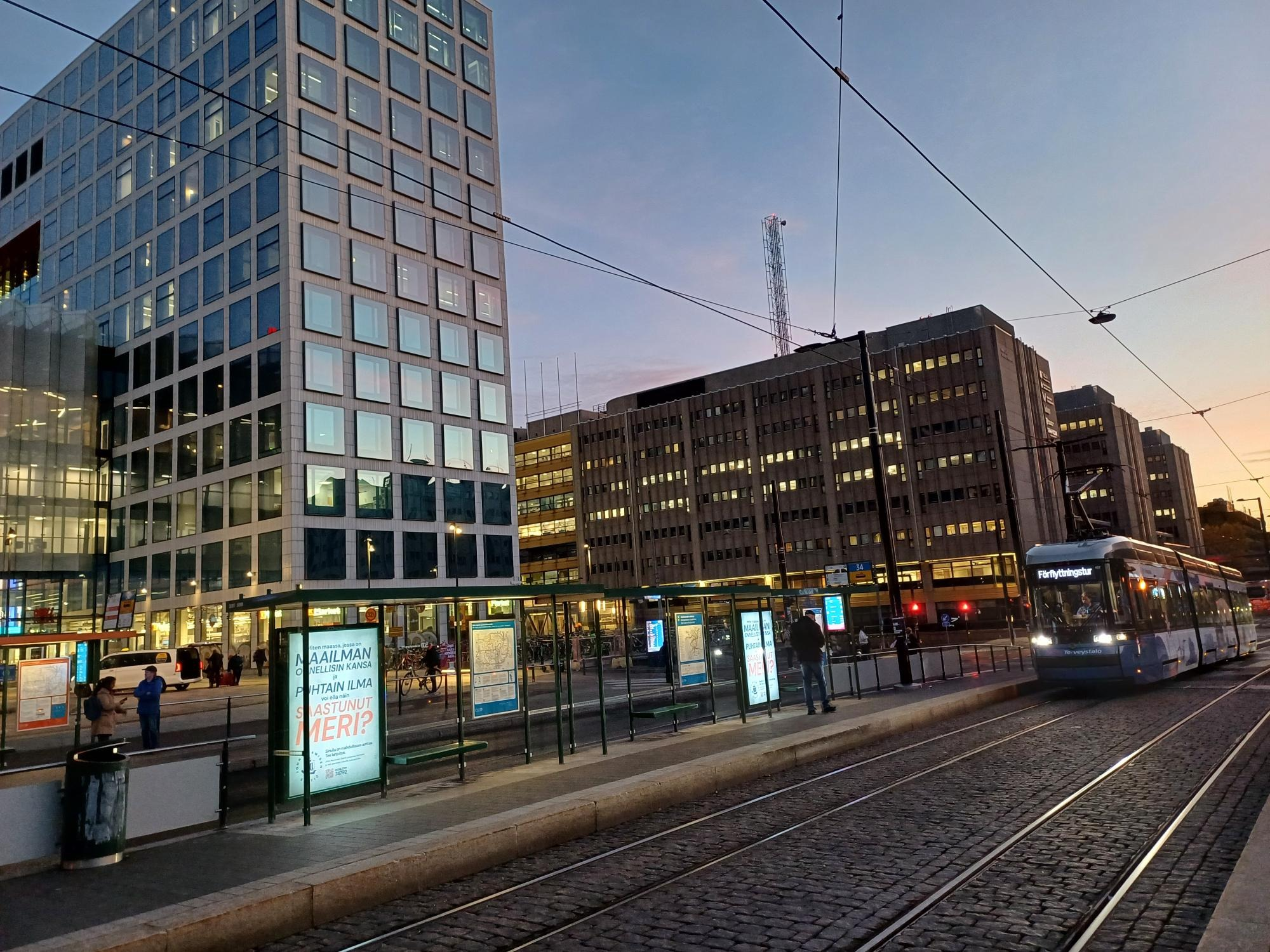
Statistics Finland in Pasila

Statistics Finland (Finnish: Tilastokeskus [ˈtilɑstoˌkeskus], Swedish: Statistikcentralen) is the national statistical institution in Finland, established in 1865 to serve as an information service and to provide statistics and expertise in the statistical sciences. The institution employs more than 800 experts from varying fields.

The institution is led by Director General Markus Sovala.
