= Tourism in Finland =

Tourism in a northern country

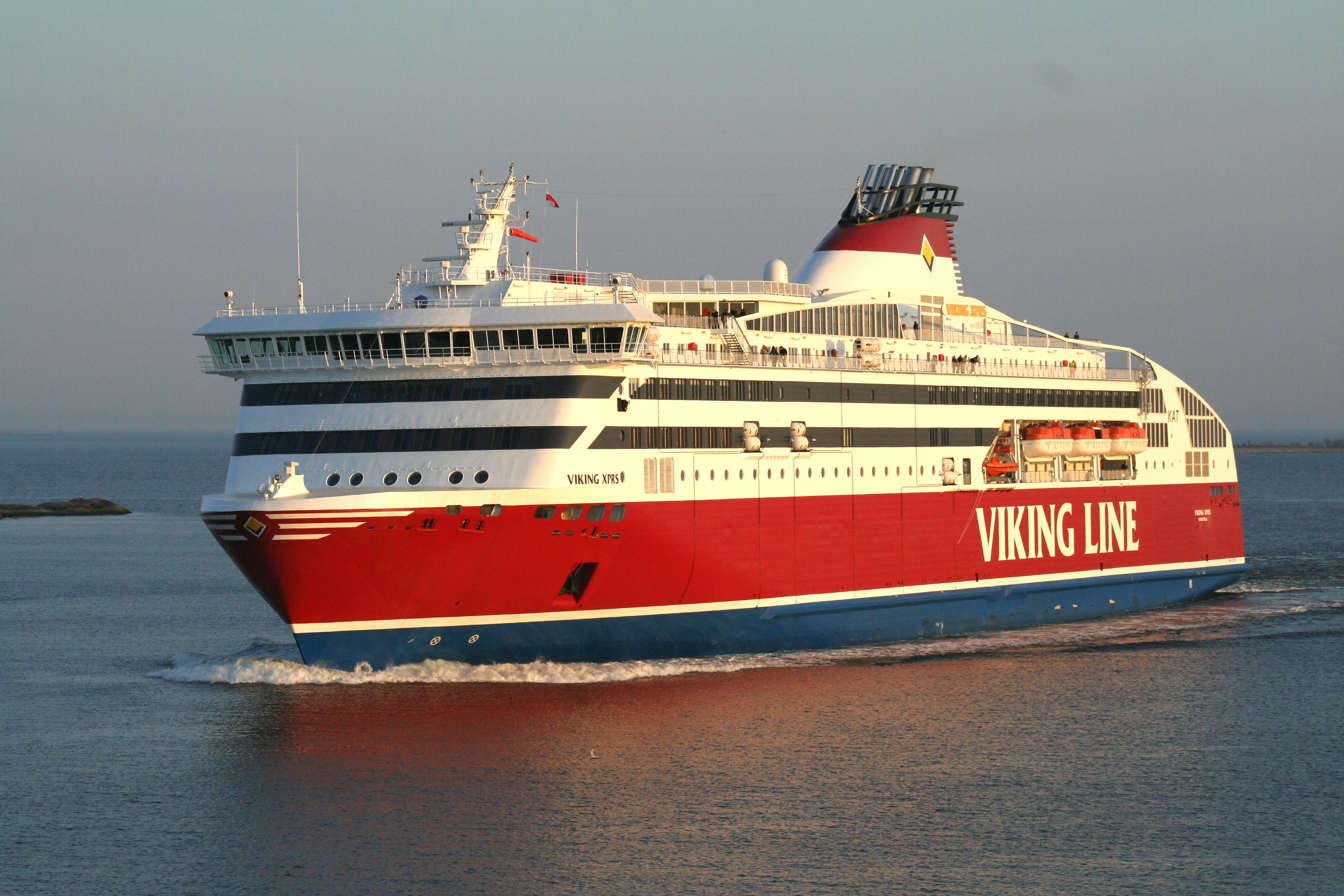
2008-built fast cruiseferry MS Viking XPRS approaching Helsinki. Due to high traffic from the Baltic Sea cruiseferries, the Port of Helsinki is the busiest passenger port in the world (as of 2018).

In 2025, Finland was visited by nearly 5.1 million foreign tourists, an increase of four percent compared to the previous year. Tourism generated approximately 3.7€ billion in export revenue for Finland's economy. The largest source countries for visitors were Estonia, Germany, Sweden, and the United Kingdom.

== Statistics ==
Yearly tourist arrivals in millions

Most visitors arriving to Finland come from Estonia, Germany, the United Kingdom, and Sweden, based on the number of trips made. However, when measured by registered overnight stays in accommodation establishments, Germany is the leading source country, followed by the United Kingdom, Sweden, the United States, and France.

| Rank | Country | 2025 |
|---|---|---|
| 1 | Germany | 772,500 |
| 2 | United Kingdom | 687,500 |
| 3 | Sweden | 544,500 |
| 4 | United States | 494,000 |
| 5 | France | 423,000 |
| 6 | Netherlands | 313,600 |
| 7 | Italy | 271,700 |
| 8 | China | 238,800 |
| 9 | Spain | 217,000 |
| 10 | Japan | 205,900 |
| 11 | Switzerland | 204,200 |
| 12 | Estonia | 194,300 |
| 13 | Norway | 183,600 |
| 14 | Australia | 160,100 |
| 15 | Denmark | 134,000 |
| 16 | Poland | 130,800 |
| 17 | India | 127,000 |
| 18 | Belgium | 124,900 |
| Total foreign | | 5,427,400 |

== Nature and Geography ==
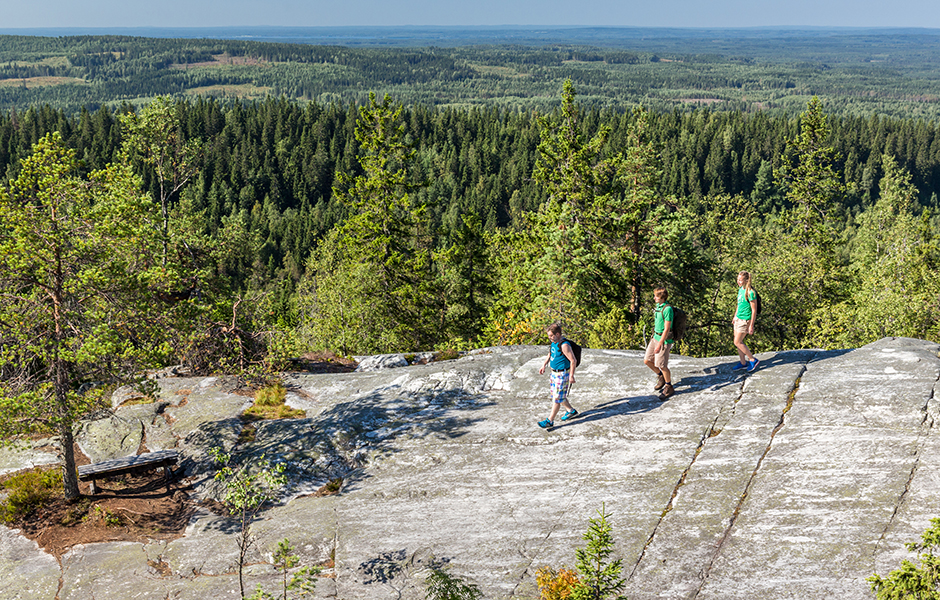
People hiking in the Koli National Park

Finland is estimated to have around 168,000 lakes, counting all bodies of water at least 500 square metres (0.05 hectares) in size. If the threshold is raised to lakes larger than one hectare, the Finnish Environment Institute puts the number at approximately 57,000. Together, Finland's lakes cover roughly 10% of the country's total land area, an area comparable in size to Belgium.

=== Largest Lakes ===
Finland's largest lake is Saimaa, with a surface area of about 1,377 km². Other major lakes in the country include:

| Rank | Lake | Area (km²) |
|---|---|---|
| 1 | Saimaa | 1,377 |
| 2 | Päijänne | 1,080 |
| 3 | Inari | 1,040 |
| 4 | Pielinen | 894 |
| 5 | Oulujärvi | 887 |

=== Nature attractions ===
In addition to lakes, Finland is the most forested country in Europe by proportion of land area, with forests covering more than 70% of its territory. The country's timber stock has grown continuously in recent decades, as annual forest growth (around 110 million m³) has consistently exceeded logging volumes (60–75 million m³). Roughly 13% of Finland's forest area, three million hectares is protected or under restricted use, the highest share of any European country. Finland has 41 national parks, all managed by Metsähallitus, the state agency responsible for protected areas.

National parks are Finland's most visited nature attractions, drawing millions of visits each year. In 2023 they received about 3.6 million visits, an increase of 12 per cent since 2019. The two most popular are both in Lapland: Pallas-Yllästunturi National Park (584,000 visits) and Urho Kekkonen National Park (418,000 visits). The third is Nuuksio National Park (274,000 visits) in Uusimaa, located mainly in Espoo about 35 kilometers from central Helsinki.

== Museums and art galleries in Finland ==
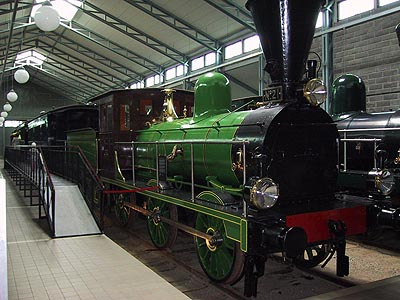
A painstakingly restored British 0-6-0 "Neilson and Company" 0-6-0 steam locomotive, used in Finland from 1869 well into the 1920s, preserved at the Finnish Railway Museum

=== Most popular museums ===
Finland has around 150 professionally managed museums, which together received about 8.6 million visits in 2025. The most visited museum is the Ateneum art museum in Helsinki, which received about 508,000 visits in 2025. It was followed by the Helsinki City Museum, the Kiasma museum of contemporary art, the Vapriikki Museum Centre in Tampere and Finnish Museum of Natural History.

The Ateneum has been at the centre of Finnish art since 1888. Its collection around 30,000 works includes Finnish masters such as Albert Edelfelt, Akseli Gallen-Kallela and Helene Schierfbeck. There is also work from other artist as well as works by Paul Cézanne, Paul Gauguin and Vincent Van Gogh.

The Helsinki City Museum is located in the oldest blocks of the city, next to Senate Square, and tells the story of Helsinki's past through the lives of its residents. Admission is free, which can explain its high visitor numbers. While the Ateneum focuses on older art, Kiasma presents contemporary and modern art from the collections of the Finnish National Gallery. Its angular and glass-fronted building is designed by architecture Steven Holl.

The fourth most popular museum is located in Tampere. It is housed in the historic Tampella Factory hall, whose oldest parts date from the 1880s, and hosts changing exhibitions on history, technology and natural science. Vapriikki also includes several smaller museums, among them the Finnish Hockey Hall of Fame and the Finnish Museum of Games.

The fifth is The Natural History Museum, part of the University of Helsinki. Its five permanent exhibitions cover Finnish nature, world nature, the history of life, bones and climate change.

=== Other museums in Finland ===
- Amos Rex
- Sinebrychoff Art Museum
- Helsinki Art Museum
- Gallen-Kallela Museum
- Suomenlinna
- Espoo Museum of Modern Art
- Museum of Finnish Architecture
- Finnish Museum of Natural History
- Military Museum of Finland
- Gallen-Kallela Museum
- Espoo Museum of Modern Art
- Sara Hildén Art Museum
- Moomin Museum
- Finnish Railway Museum
- Jokioinen Museum Railway
- Turku Art Museum
- Heureka
- Åland Maritime Museum
- Arktikum

== Cities in Finland ==
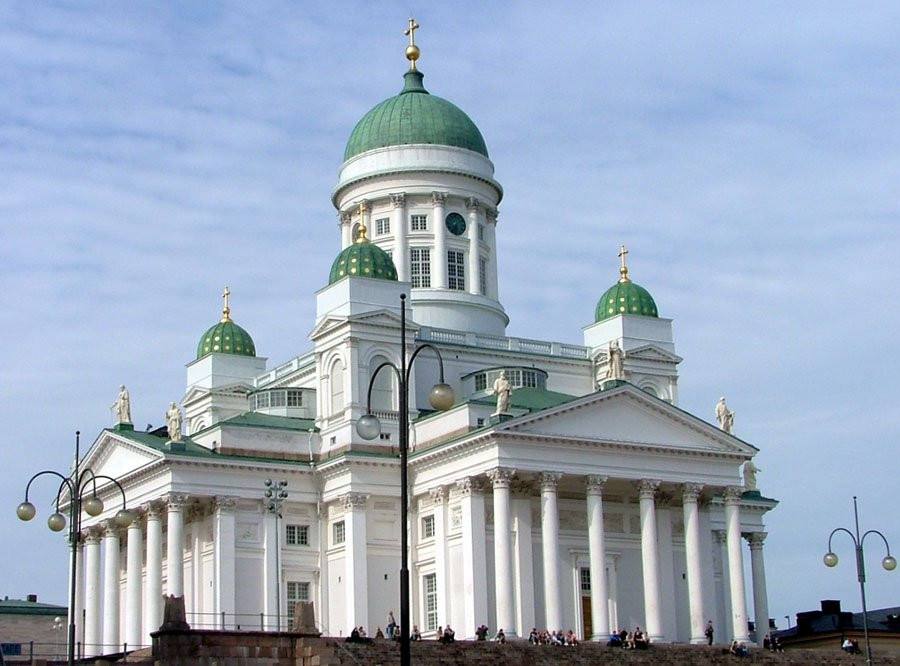
Helsinki Cathedral

Helsinki is the capital of Finland and a largest city with the population of 694,392. It is also the most popular destination for international visitors to Finland. In 2025 over 4.9 million overnights were registered in the city, an increase of 8.2 per cent from the previous year. The growth was driven mainly by international leisure travel and the overnight stays by foreign visitors rose by 17.4%, and Helsinki accounted for 36% of all international overnight stays in Finland.

Largest cities in Finland by population (31 December 2025)
| Rank | City | Region | Population |
|---|---|---|---|
| 1 | Helsinki | Uusimaa | 694,392 |
| 2 | Espoo | Uusimaa | 325,716 |
| 3 | Tampere | Pirkanmaa | 263,337 |
| 4 | Vantaa | Uusimaa | 252,956 |
| 5 | Oulu | North Ostrobothnia | 217,469 |
| 6 | Turku | Southwest Finland | 209,633 |
| 7 | Jyväskylä | Central Finland | 149,895 |
| 8 | Kuopio | North Savo | 126,572 |
| 9 | Lahti | Päijät-Häme | 121,832 |
| 10 | Pori | Satakunta | 83,010 |

=== Helsinki ===
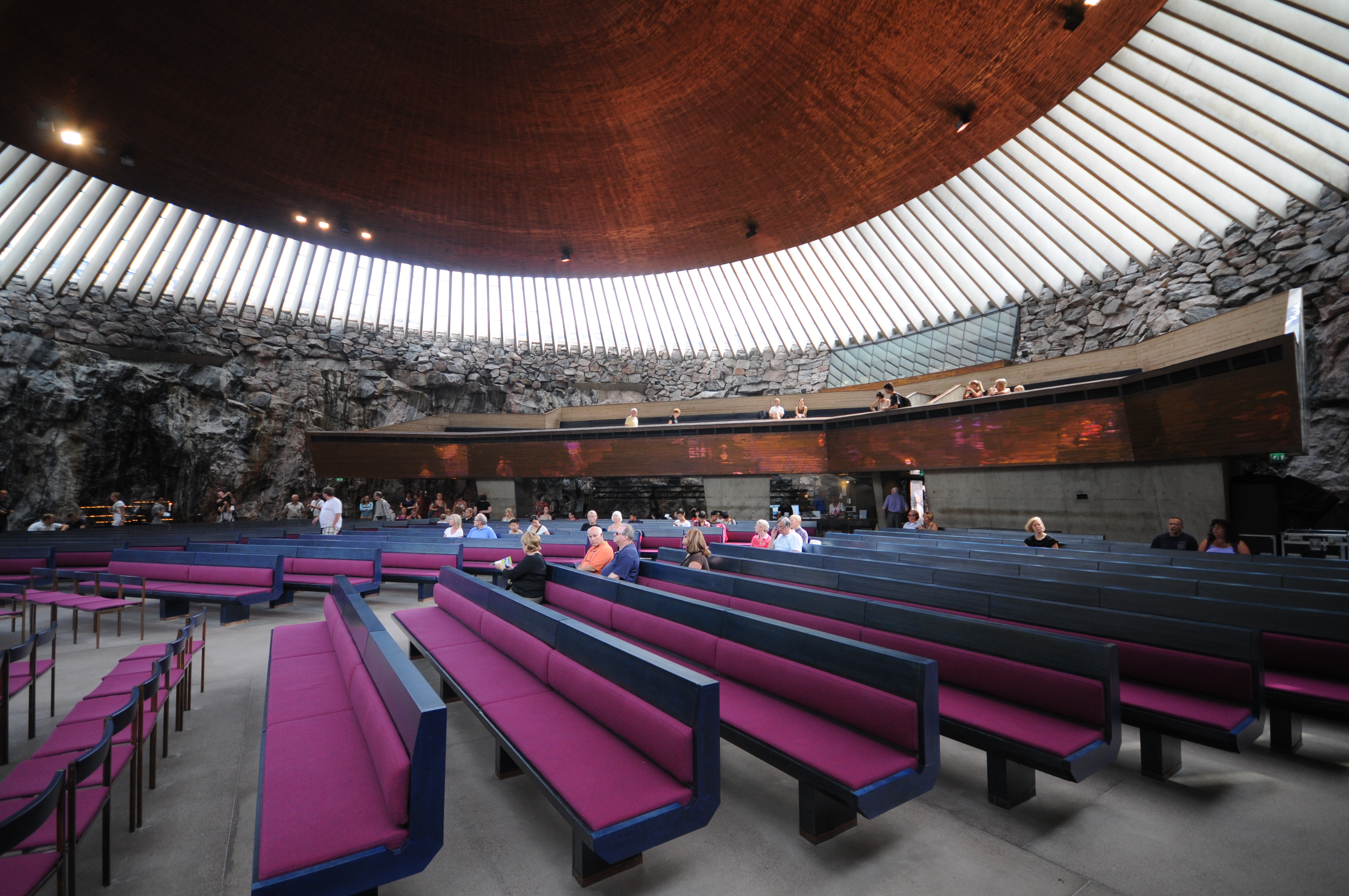
The Temppeliaukio church is one of the most popular tourist attractions in the city; half a million people visit it annually.

Helsinki is the largest city in the country, although it is relatively small compared to other European capitals. The city is made up of an archipelago of more than 300 islands and is surrounded by the sea on three sides, with 130 kilometers of public coastal routes. Helsinki's coastal position makes it ideal to experience in the summertime from one of the many sightseeing ferries leaving from the port of Helsinki. Many of Helsinki's main attractions are also related to the sea, including the Suomenlinna sea fortress (a UNESCO World Heritage Site) and the Seurasaari Island with its parks and open-air museum. Locals often spend sunny days at the Hietaniemi beach (often simply called Hietsu), Helsinki's main beach in the district of Töölö.

In the winter-time Helsinki's northern position makes it dark for most of the day, with lighting fixtures such as Aleksanterinkatu's Christmas street (Joulukatu). During the coldest months of the winter, it is very common for locals to go for walks on the frozen sea, although authorities recommend caution when the ice is thin. There are also many places for ice swimming along the coast, some with saunas.

Air travel to Helsinki is via Helsinki Airport, situated in the neighboring city of Vantaa, a city part of the Helsinki metropolitan area. Helsinki also has popular cruiseferry links with Stockholm, Sweden and Tallinn, Estonia. Silja, Viking and Tallink are the biggest ferry operators.

Helsinki is also the home of the Linnanmäki amusement park, which features five rollercoasters and many other rides, including the world's first Intamin ZacSpin rollercoaster.

Helsinki is a safe city for tourists and a safe place to live. In terms of personal safety, Finland was ranked 14 out of 163 countries according to Global Peace Index 2019.

Helsinki also has efficient tourist information system maintained by the City of Helsinki Tourism & Convention Bureau located in the city center next to the Esplanadi park.

Helsinki was ranked 10th of the most expensive cities in the world according to UBS Group AG's Prices and Earnings report for 2018. Travelers should plan to spend around US$216 or €199 per day on their vacation in Helsinki, which is the average daily cost of staying in a 4-star hotel, visiting 2 popular attractions, using public transportation, and eating out in mid-range restaurants with a glass of wine included.

=== Tampere ===
A view from Pyynikki observation tower towards the city centre. The Näsinneula tower is prominently visible at about a third from the left.

Tampere, also known as the "Manchester of Finland", has often been rated as the most popular city in Finland, and has grown into Finland's second largest, and the second best-known, Finnish city in the world after Helsinki. The old industrial city built between lakes Näsijärvi and Pyhäjärvi, and along Tammerkoski rapids has also become a tourist destination hosting various national and international events, museums (such as Moomin Museum), market places (such as Tampere Market Hall) and Särkänniemi amusement park. Tampere's local traditional food "mustamakkara" has been recognised internationally, including by celebrity chef Anthony Bourdain. Tampere has been officially declared the "Sauna Capital of the World".

Many of Finland's most important highways between different cities intersect at Tampere, such as the Helsinki-Tampere Highway (part of E12). Also, air travel to Tampere is via Tampere-Pirkkala Airport, situated in the neighbouring municipality of Pirkkala, a part of the Tampere metropolitan area.

Tampere is also known for several educational institutions, such as University of Applied Sciences and Police University College; the Tampere University, like the city, is also the second largest of its kind in Finland.

=== Jyväskylä ===
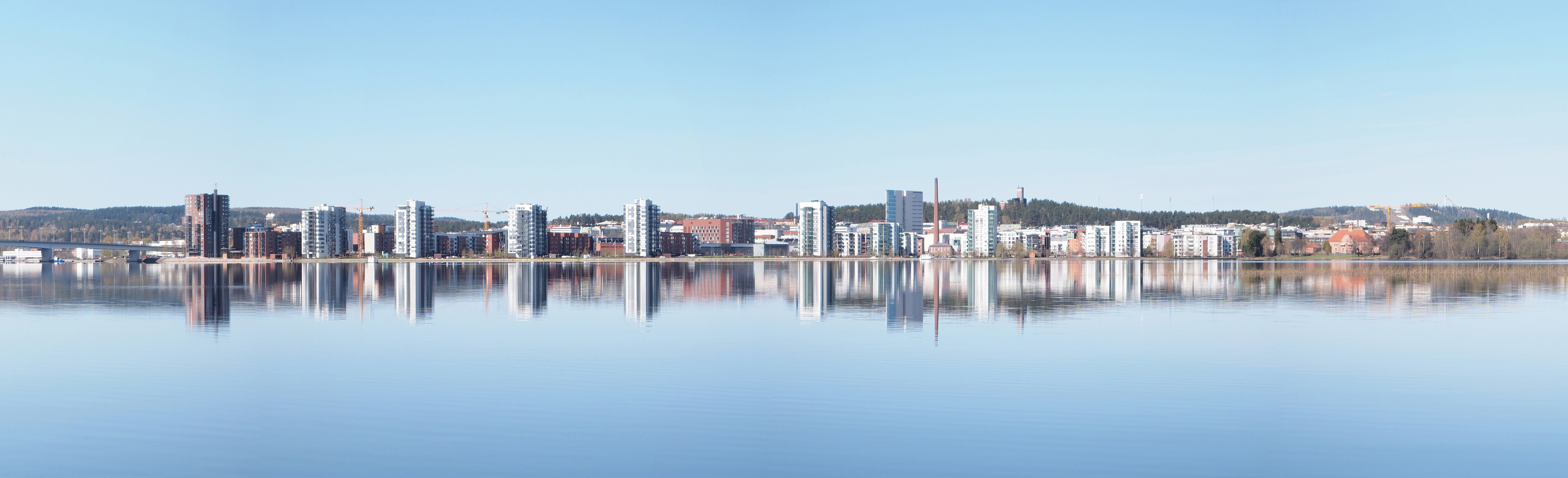
A view from Lake Jyväsjärvi towards the city centre.

Lonely Planet calls Jyväskylä as a Mecca for architecture lovers around the world for its large collection of Alvar Aalto buildings. The city is the biggest city on Finnish Lakeland and capital of Central Finland. Later, a modern architect Arto Sipinen, a pupil of Aalto, has influenced in the cityscape since the 1970s by designing most of the new university buildings in the city.

The Alvar Aalto Museum and the Museum of Central Finland form a centre of culture in the immediate vicinity of the historical campus of the University of Jyväskylä. Both museums are designed by a functionalist Alvar Aalto. The Alvar Aalto Museum displays the artist's most important work and design. The Museum of Central Finland specializes in cultural history. It serves both as the town museum of Jyväskylä and the provincial museum of Central Finland. Nokkakivi Amusement Park is about 20 km from Jyväskylä.

One of architect Aalto's most significant works Säynätsalo Town Hall is located in Säynätsalo island on Lake Päijänne.

The city hosts the Neste Oil Rally Finland (formerly known as 1000 Lakes Rally). It is the biggest annually organised public event in the Nordic countries, gathering over 500,000 spectators every year. The rally has been held since 1951, first as a national competition, then from 1959 on as a European Rally Championship event and since the introduction of the World Rally Championship in 1973, as Finland's WRC event.

UNESCO World Heritage site Petäjävesi Old Church is located in vicinity of Jyväskylä.

=== Porvoo ===
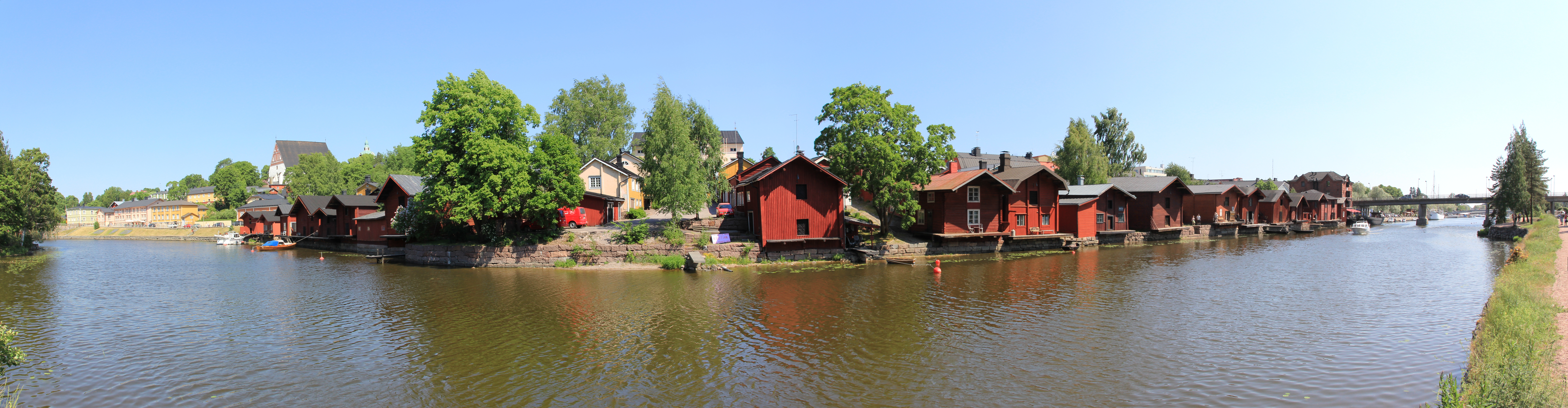
A view from Porvoo River towards the Porvoo Old Town.

Porvoo has often been called an authentic small town and has been chosen as one of the most beautiful towns in Finland on several occasions. The city is one of the six medieval towns in Finland, first mentioned as a city in texts from the 14th century. At the beginning of the 19th century, the city played an important role in connection with the Diet of Porvoo, when Finland, which at that time was part of the Russian Empire, gained autonomy in the form of the Grand Duchy of Finland.

The Porvoo Old Town is a popular tourist destination, known for its well-preserved 18th and 19th century buildings and 15th century cathedral, the Porvoo Cathedral. The Old Town together with Porvoo River River Valley is recognized as historically and culturally significant as one of the National landscapes of Finland. Porvoo is also culturally important in that many of the most significant writers, starting with J. L. Runeberg, are largely from Porvoo or its immediate sub-region municipalities (such as Johannes Linnankoski from Askola).

Attempts have been made to make the Porvoo Old Town a UNESCO World Heritage site, but so far it has not been qualified.

== Northern Finland and winter sports ==
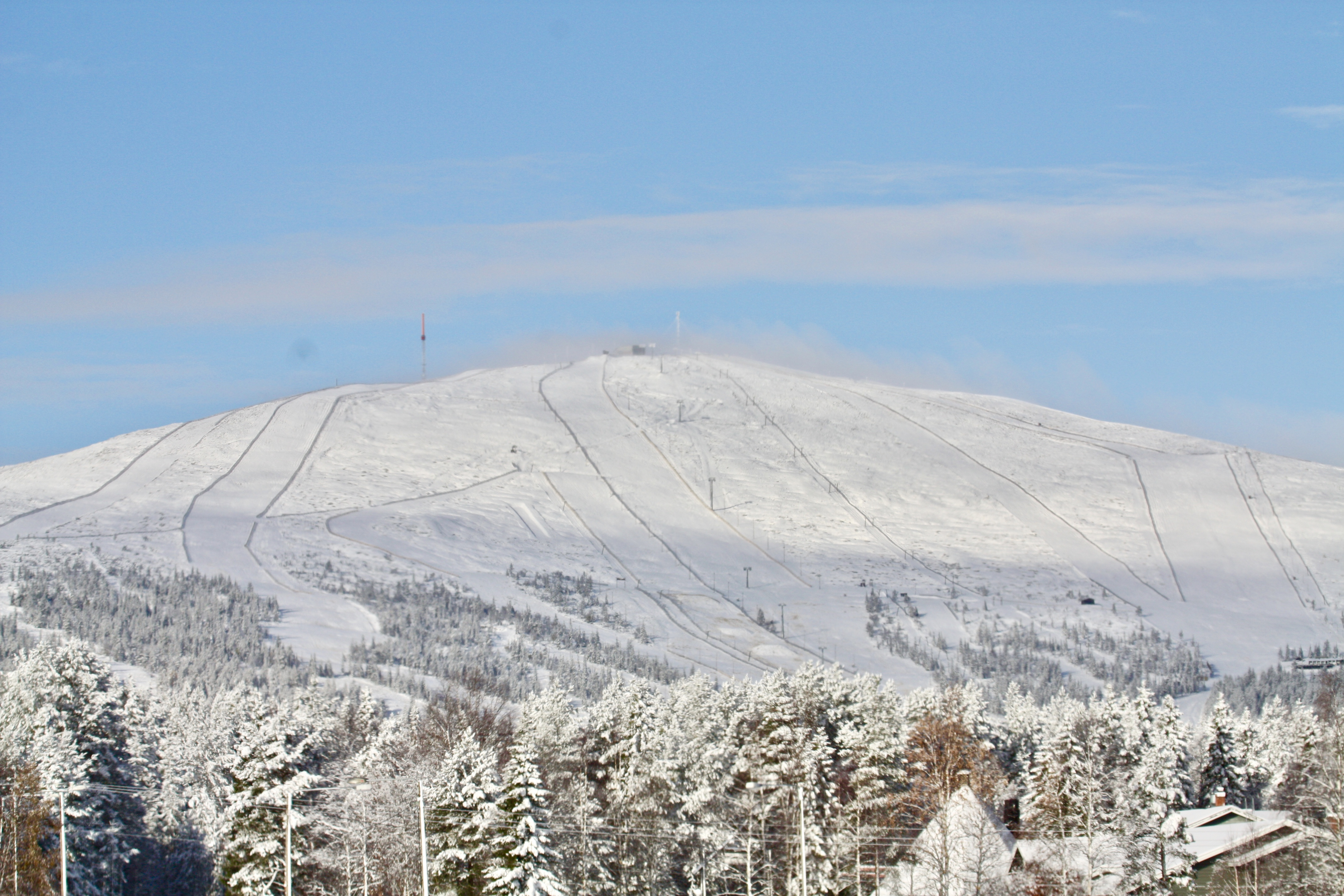
Ylläs ski resort in Finnish Lapland

Northern Finland, mainly Lapland, has a strong profile as an internationally popular winter holiday destination, which is why the nickname "winter wonderland" has also been used. In the winter there is a large snowcastle with an Ice hotel built every year in the northern town of Kemi. Rovaniemi is a place from which to see the aurora borealis or northern lights. Tourists in the north of the country in winter often enjoy trips in reindeer sleighs with Sami drivers, in dog sleighs, or on snowmobiles.

In wintertime, Finland provides opportunities for cross-country skiing and alpine skiing. Many of the popular ski resorts are situated north of the Arctic Circle in Lapland, but there are exceptions like Kuusamo in the northeastern part of Oulu Province and Himos in Jämsä, only 200 kilometres (120 mi) north of Helsinki.

Santa Claus (Joulupukki) is commonly considered to live on the Korvatunturi fell in Lapland. In addition, the largest town in Finnish Lapland, Rovaniemi, has two theme parks dedicated to the character: Santa Claus Village and Santa Park. Finnish Lapland (Rovaniemi and surroundings) is also the best place in the country to see the aurora borealis. Santa Claus Village is a popular holiday destination for families with children during Christmas time.

== Cuisine ==
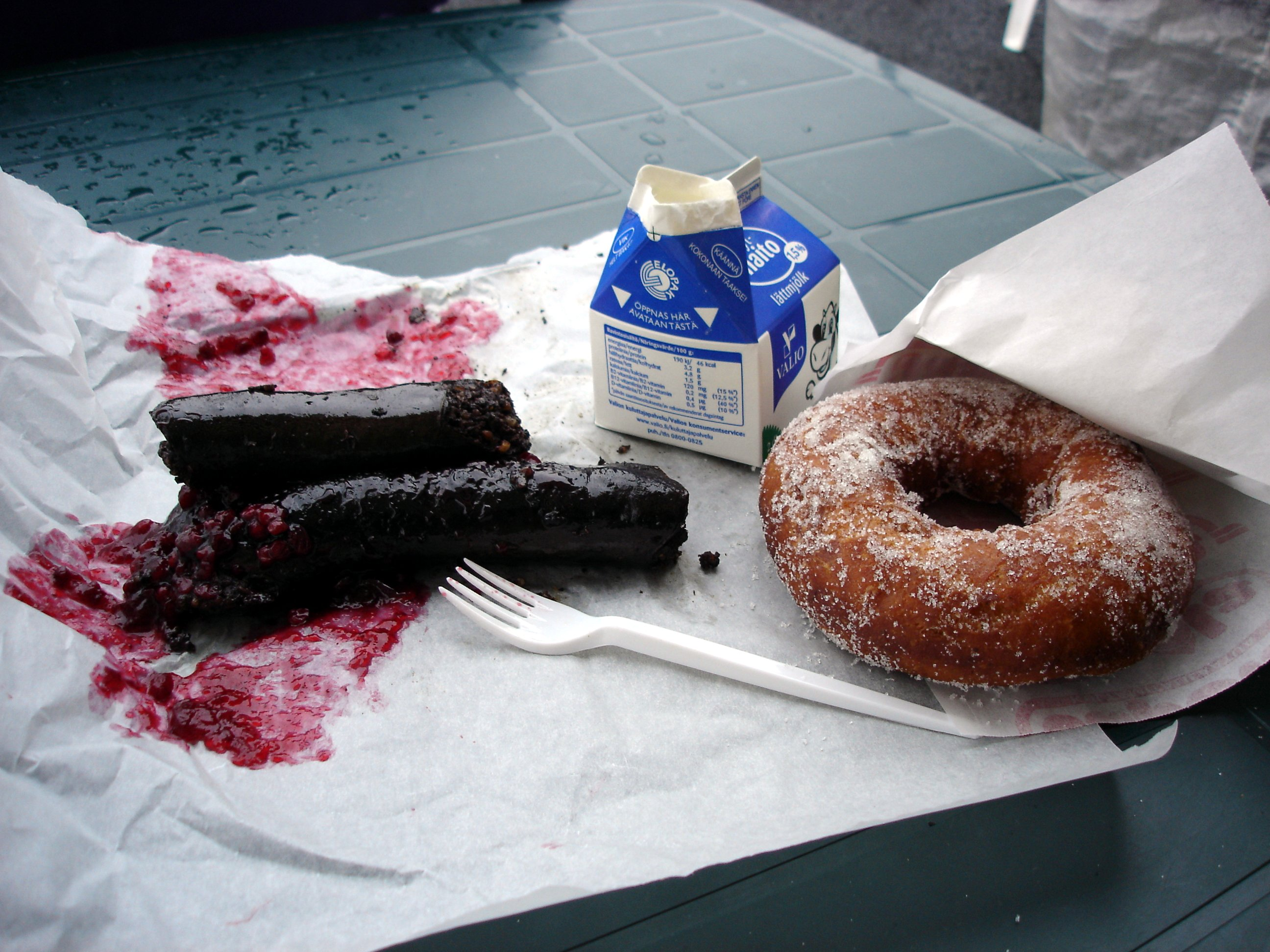
Mustamakkara, a traditional food in Tampere, with lingonberry jam, milk, and a doughnut

Finnish cuisine includes fresh ingredients, particularly game and fish, foraged berries and mushrooms such as false morels, and even reindeer. Alcoholic drinks of note are Koskenkorva, the salty liquorice-flavored Salmiakki Koskenkorva and cloudberry liqueur.

== Transportation ==
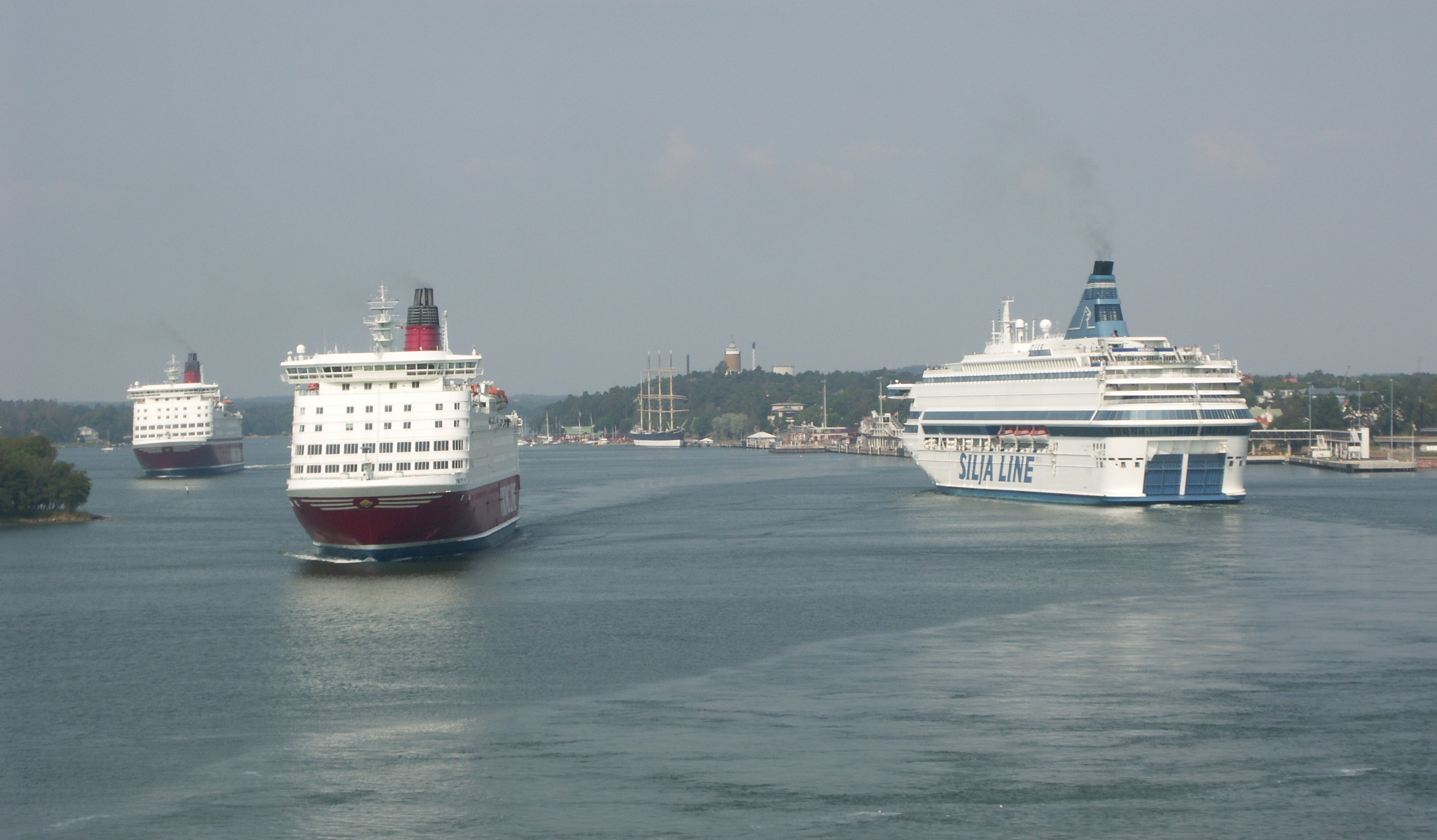
Ferries near the Western Harbour of Mariehamn, Åland

Finland has an extensive public transport network, with long-distance trains and buses connecting cities, towns and smaller communities across the country.

Public transport journeys across Finland can be planned using Matkahuolto's Matkat mobile app, which brings together routes, timetables and ticketing services from a wide range of Finnish public transport operators. The app covers most of Finland's long-distance and local public transport services.

The Finnish rail system is operated by VR. It offers InterCity and express trains throughout the country, and the faster Pendolino trains connecting the major cities. There are very large discounts (usually 50%) available for children (7-16 yr), students, senior citizens, and conscripts. Connections to Sweden are by bus due to rail gauge differences. It's possible to take the Silja, Tallink and Viking Line ferries from Helsinki to Mariehamn in the Åland archipelago, Stockholm (Sweden), Rostock and Travemünde in Germany, and to Tallinn (Estonia). Wasaline operates the ferry route from Vaasa to Holmsund in Umeå.

There are about 25 airports in Finland with scheduled passenger services. Finnair, and Nordic Regional Airlines provide air services both domestically and internationally. Helsinki-Vantaa airport is Finland's global gateway with scheduled non-stop flights to such places as Bangkok, Beijing, Guangzhou, Hong Kong, Miami, Nagoya, New Delhi, New York, Osaka, Seoul, Shanghai, Tokyo and Istanbul. Helsinki has an optimal location for great circle airline traffic routes between Western Europe and the Far East. Hence, many foreign tourists visit Helsinki on a stop-over while flying from Asia to Europe or vice versa. The Helsinki-Vantaa Airport was ranked 18th in the Skytrax World's Top 100 Airports survey.

== See also ==
- Provinces of Finland
- Culture of Finland
- Tourism
- Tourism in Norway
- Tourism in Sweden
- Tourism in Denmark
