= Huuvari =

Huuvari Hovarböle
- Village
- Location in Finland
- Coordinates: 60°31′52″N 25°43′00″E
- Country: Finland
- Region: Uusimaa
- Municipality: Askola
- Time zone: UTC+2 (EET)
  - Summer (DST): UTC+3 (EEST)

Huuvari (Swedish: Hovarböle) is a village in Askola municipality in Eastern Uusimaa between Juornaankylä and Särkijärvi villages. It is located in the east part of the municipality, near the Lake Tiiläänjärvi, which is the largest lake in the municipality.

== Sources ==
- Kekkonen, Ilmo: Huuvarin-Särkijärven kyläkirja. Huuvari-Särkijärven nuorisoseura, 2002. ISBN 952-91-4439-3.
