= Vakkola =

Coordinates: 60°31′N 25°36′E

- Village
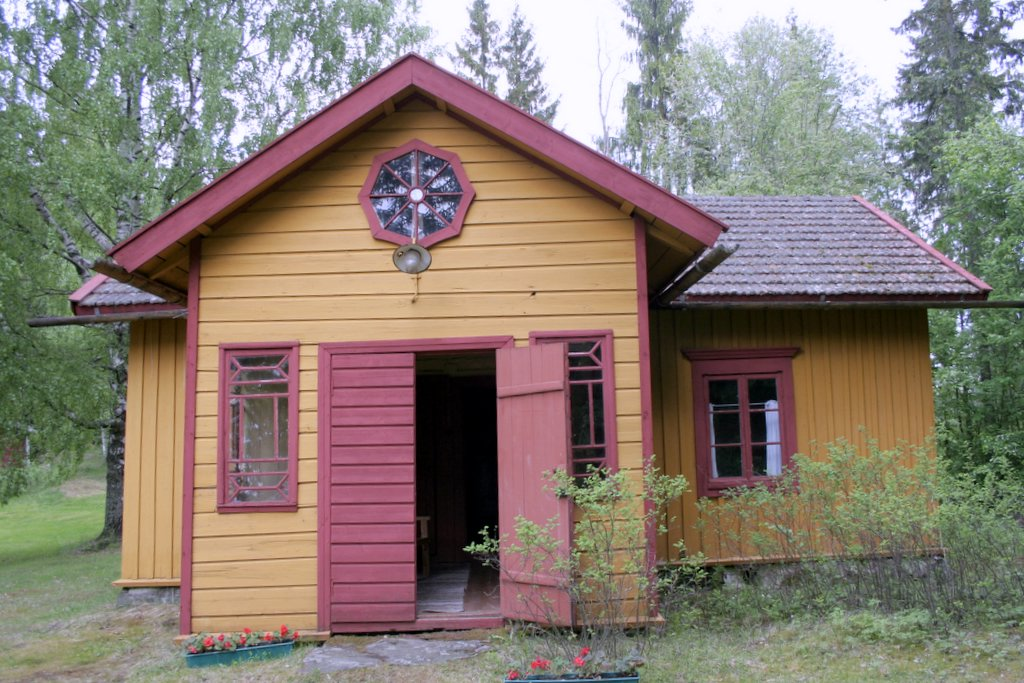
- The childhood home of Finnish writer Johannes Linnankoski in Vakkola.
- Interactive map of Vakkola
- Country: Finland
- Region: Uusimaa
- Municipality: Askola
- Time zone: UTC+2 (EET)
  - Summer (DST): UTC+3 (EEST)

Vakkola is a village in Askola municipality in Eastern Uusimaa, Finland. It is located 5 kilometers northeast of Monninkylä along the Porvoo River, just a couple of kilometers from Askola's church village. In 2009, the Finnish Heritage Agency classified Vakkola village as a national cultural heritage site of national significance.

Vakkola is the birthplace of the author Johannes Linnankoski (1869–1913) and his childhood home serves as a home museum.
