= The Song of the Scarlet Flower =

The Song of the Scarlet Flower may refer to:

- The Song of the Blood-Red Flower, a 1905 novel by writer Johannes Linnankoski
- The Song of the Scarlet Flower (1938 film), a Finnish romance and drama film, based on the novel
- The Song of the Scarlet Flower (1956 film), a Swedish drama film, based on the novel
