= Monninkylä =

Monninkylä Monby
- Village
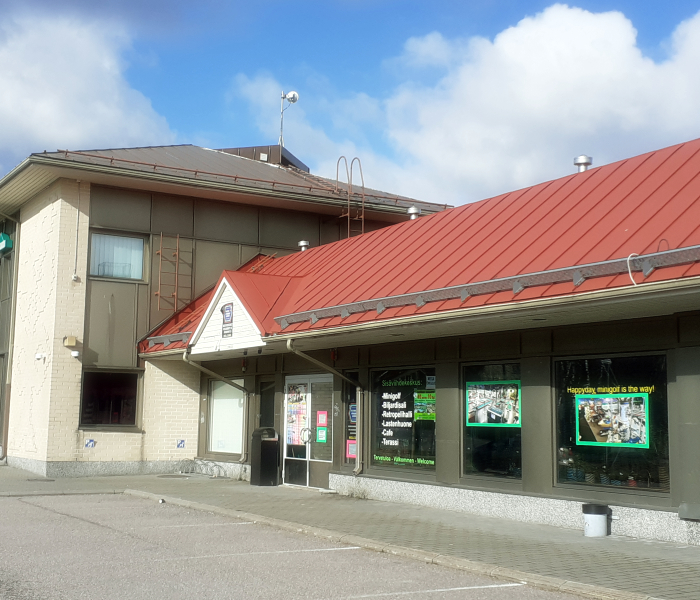
- Monacon minigolfkeskus in Monninkylä.

- Location in Finland
- Coordinates: 60°29.57′N 25°32.32′E
- Country: Finland
- Region: Uusimaa
- Municipality: Askola

Area
  - Urban: 412 km^{2} (159 sq mi)

Population (2017-12-31)
  - Village: 1,339
  - Density: 3,250/km^{2} (8,400/sq mi)
- Time zone: UTC+2 (EET)
  - Summer (DST): UTC+3 (EEST)
- Postal code: 07230

Monninkylä (Finnish: [ˈmonːiŋˌkylæ]; Swedish: Monby, Finland Swedish: [ˈmoːnbyː], formerly known as Månby) is a village in Askola municipality in Eastern Uusimaa. Together with Askola's church village, it is one of the main settlement centers of the municipality. Monninkylä has a population of 1,339, which makes it the largest village of the municipality in terms of population.

The location of the village, near the main road between Porvoo and Mäntsälä, has greatly influenced population growth. The village is located just off the Porvoo border, but the distance to the city centre is about 17 kilometres. Also, the distance from Monninkylä to Mäntsälä is about 21 kilometres and to Kirveskoski of the neighbouring municipality Pornainen is about 10 kilometres.

The nearest lake is Vahijärvi in the northern part of the village, across the main road.

== Buildings and services ==
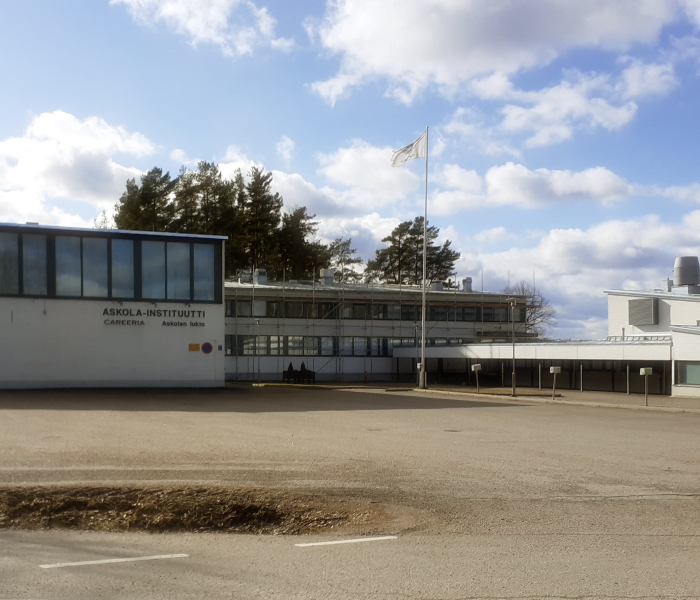
Askola High School in Monnikylä.

Monninkylä is home to three schools: Askola High School, Vocational College (AMISTO) maintained by the Regional Council of Eastern Uusimaa and Monninkylä Primary School, that was reported after the arsonist set fire to the school in July 2017. In Monninkylä, the municipal services include: clinic, dentist, library, kebab pizzeria, Sale grocery store, hairdressing salon, driving school and Osuuspankki bank office.

The village is also home to Finland's only outdoor swimming pool maintained by a parish, which is open from June to August. There is also an indoor mini golf called Monacon minigolfkeskus in the Monninkylä centre.

== See also ==
- Mäntsälä (village)
