= Laakso (surname) =

Laakso is a Finnish surname. Notable people with the surname include:

- Aleksi Laakso (born 1990), Finnish ice hockey defenceman
- Eric Laakso (1956–2010), American football player
- Jaakko Laakso (born 1948), Finnish politician
- Juhani Laakso (1942–2014), Finnish sports shooter
- Juho Laakso (1854–1915), Finnish tenant farmer and politician
- Leo Laakso (1918–2002), Finnish ski jumper
- Martti Laakso (born 1943), Finnish wrestler
- Matti Laakso (1939–2020), Finnish wrestler
- Rob Laakso, American musician, record producer and engineer
- Sheikki Laakso, Finnish politician
- Tapio Laakso (born 1985), Finnish ice hockey defenceman
- Teemu Laakso (born 1987), Finnish ice hockey defenceman
