= Finnish national road 55 =

Road in Uusimaa region, Finland

Highway 55
- Kantatie 55 (Finnish); Stamväg 55 (Swedish)
- Läntinen Mannerheimintie, Mäntsäläntie, Porvoontie
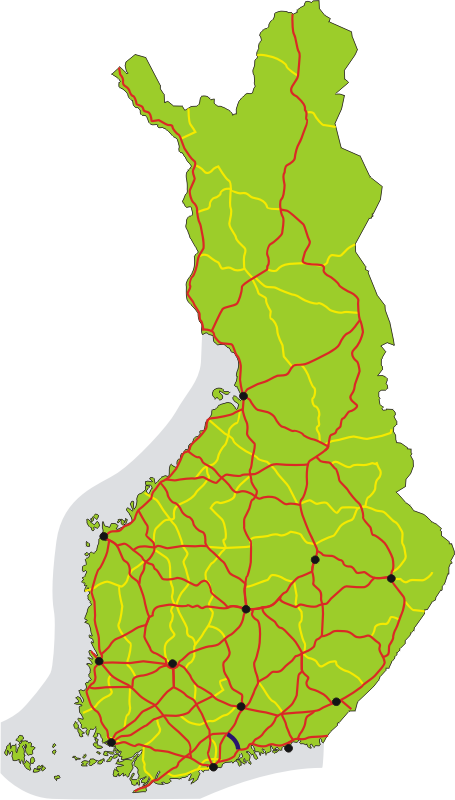

Route information
- Maintained by the Finnish Transport Agency
- Length: 36 km (22 mi)
- Existed: 1938–present

Major junctions
- From: St 140 in Mäntsälä
- To: St 170 in Porvoo

Location
- Country: Finland

Highway system
- Highways in Finland
← Kt 54	→ Kt 56

The Finnish national road 55 (Finnish: Kantatie 55; Swedish: Stamväg 55) is the 2nd class main route between the municipality of Mäntsälä and the city of Porvoo in southern Finland. It also passes through the municipality of Askola. Going in the opposite direction, from Mäntsälä to Hanko, the road continues as the 1st class main road 25. Together with the aforementioned road, it forms the Helsinki Metropolitan Circuit and is often referred to as the outer beltway of the Greater Helsinki or also known as the Ring V.

== History ==
In the 1938 numbering system, main road 55 ran from Porvoo via Mäntsälä, Oitti, Hausjärvi and Turenki to Hämeenlinna. The section from Mäntsälä to Hämeenlinna was dropped in 1971. The section from Mäntsälä to Oitti became road 147 (now connecting road 1471) and the section from Hausjärvi to Hämeenlinna became part of regional road 290.

== Route ==
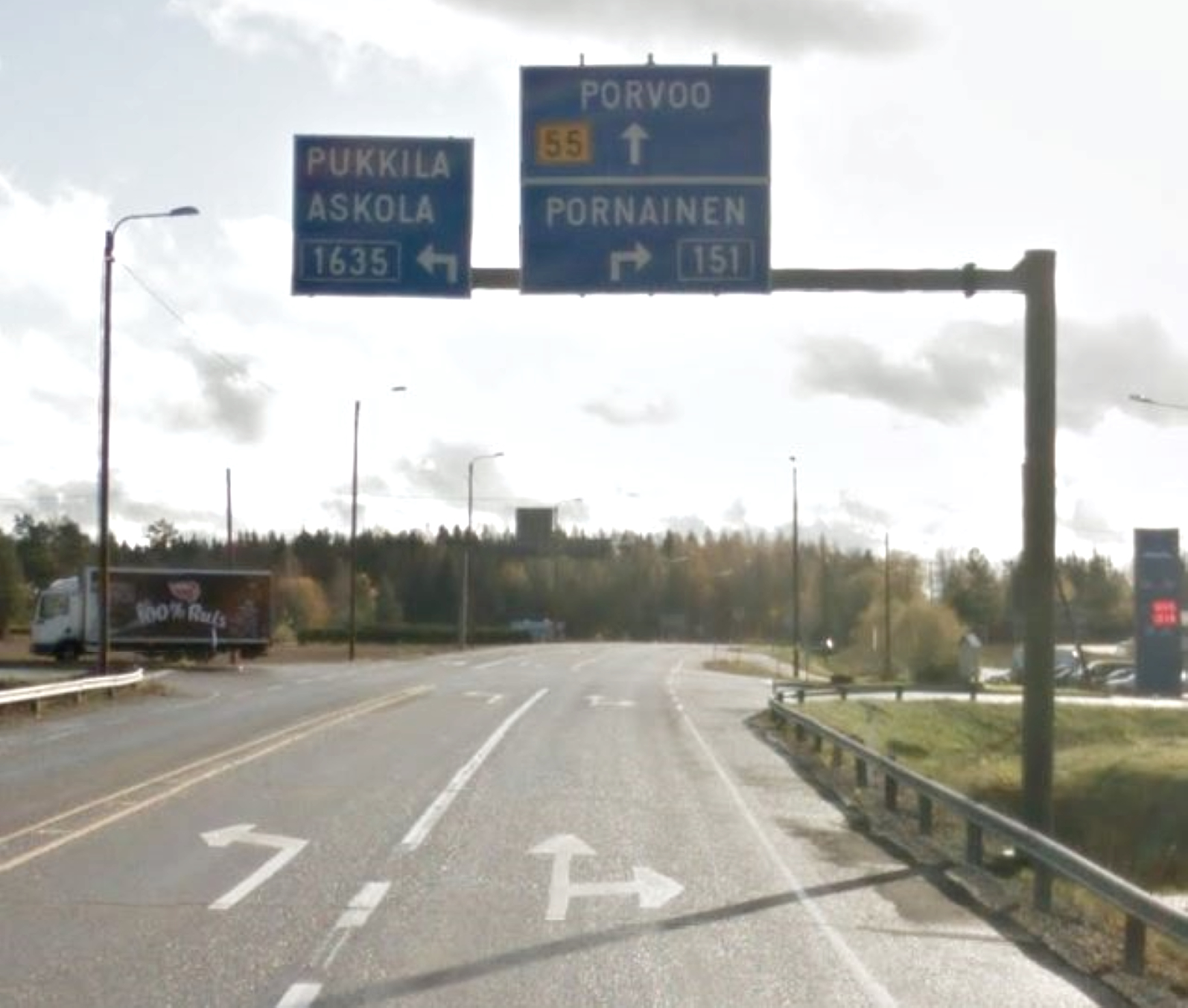
The Finnish national road 55 at Askola, near the village of Monninkylä

The road passes through the following localities:

- Mäntsälä (Mäntsälä and Sääksjärvi)
- Askola (Vahijärvi and Monninkylä)
- Porvoo (Kaarenkylä, Tuorila, Saksala and Porvoo)
