= The Fugitives (novella) =

Finnish novella by Johannes Linnankoski

- Cover of the first Finnish edition
- Author: Johannes Linnankoski
- Original title: Pakolaiset
- Language: Finnish
- Publisher: WSOY
- Publication date: 1908; 118 years ago
- Publication place: Finland
- Media type: Print
- Pages: 164

The Fugitives (Finnish: Pakolaiset) is a novella by Finnish writer Johannes Linnankoski, published in 1908, and it is considered to be one of the author's most significant works, alongside The Song of the Blood-Red Flower. Set in Tavastia, a story is about agrarian society and peasants' pride and reconciliation. The work has been translated up to eleven languages.

The story was based on actual events; at the time of writing the novella, Johannes Linnankoski lived at Lapinlahti in 1902, when a peasant family from Akaa settled there, and as in novella, an old couple's daughter married an elderly widow but had an illegitimate child with another man. Shame about adultery and fear of gossip was apparently the real reason for the move to Savonia. Linnankoski transferred the events to his story. In the village of Alapitkä, the Hovi House—where Linnankoski lived—was at the center of the book.

== Television adaptation ==
Based on the story, the television film Pakolaiset, written and directed by Veikko Kerttula, was made in 1977, starring Vilho Siivola, Martti Kainulainen and Eva Eklund.
