= Juornaankylä =

Juornaankylä Jordansböle
- Village
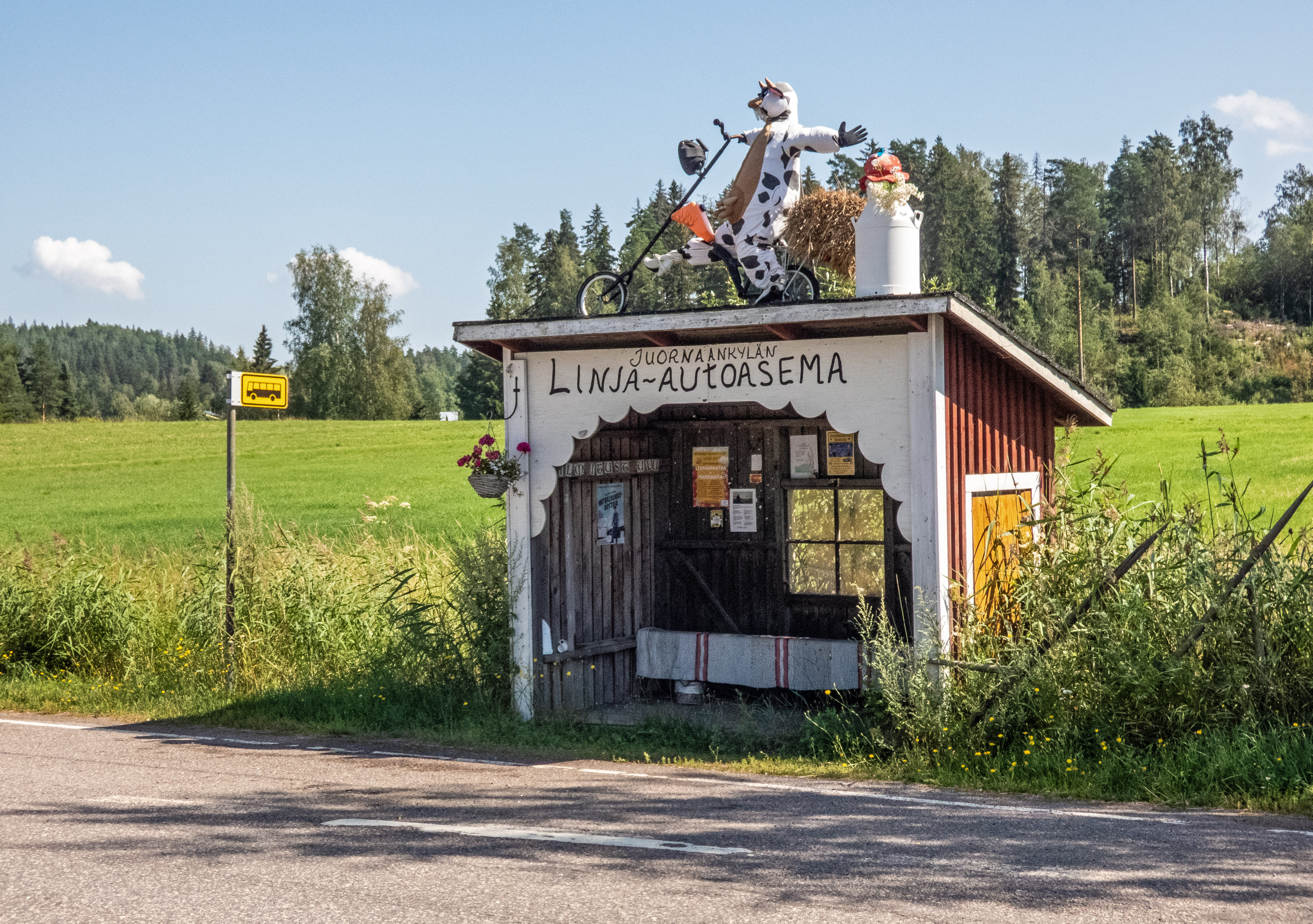
- A bus stop in Juornaankylä

- Location in Finland
- Coordinates: 60°34′06″N 25°45′30″E
- Country: Finland
- Region: Uusimaa
- Municipality: Askola
- Time zone: UTC+2 (EET)
  - Summer (DST): UTC+3 (EEST)

Juornaankylä (Swedish: Jordansböle) is a village in Askola municipality in Eastern Uusimaa with about 200 inhabitants and about 450 in the summer. It is located in the northeast part of the municipality, near the border of Myrskylä. In 2000, the village was selected as the Eastern Village of the Year.

Juornaankylä has its own village school, which includes the Parents' Association, the hunting club and the Valkjärvi Association. The village is also home to the Tarmo Food Store and the Osuuspankki bank office building. The house of the Juornaankylä Youth Club was built and renovated in 1911.
