= The Song of the Blood-Red Flower (1971 film) =

1971 film directed by Mikko Niskanen

- Original Finnish film poster
- Directed by: Mikko Niskanen
- Written by: Panu Rajala; Mikko Niskanen
- Based on: The Song of the Blood-Red Flower by Johannes Linnankoski
- Produced by: Arno Carlstedt
- Starring: Pertti Melasniemi; Marjukka Arasola; Aune Hurme-Virtanen; Anna-Maija Kokkinen; Marjatta Pasanen
- Cinematography: Osmo Harkimo; Pasi Immonen; Arto Kaivanto
- Edited by: Seija Manninen; Eero Jaakkola
- Music by: Jaakko Salo
- Release date: 29 October 1971
- Running time: 92 minutes
- Country: Finland
- Language: Finnish
- Budget: 366,600 marks

The Song of the Blood-Red Flower (Finnish: Laulu tulipunaisesta kukasta) is a 1971 Finnish romance and drama film, and the fifth adaptation of Johannes Linnankoski's 1905 novel of the same name. Film tells the story of a glib log driver Olof Koskela, who keeps sowing his wild oats, and when the time comes for him to settle down he finds it difficult to trust anyone in view of his fickle past. Film is directed by Mikko Niskanen and it stars Pertti Melasniemi, Marjukka Arasola, Aune Hurme-Virtanen, Anna-Maija Kokkinen, and Marjatta Pasanen as Kyllikki Moisio. The film is the only color film ever made on the basis of the novel.

== Cast ==
- Pertti Melasniemi as Olof Koskela
- Marjukka Arasola as "Hawthorn"
- Aune Hurme-Virtanen as Olof's mother
- Anna-Maija Kokkinen as "Daisy"
- Sirkka Korhonen as woman in the restaurang
- Soili Markkanen as "Rowan"
- Marjatta Pasanen as Kyllikki Moisio
- Regina Pekkola as "Clematis"
- Marjatta Saraheimo as "Pansy"
- Marjut Sariola as "Gazelle"
- Milla Vuolle as prostitute
- Leena Åkerlund as Annikki/"Forest Fairy"
- Mikko Niskanen as log driver (cameo)

== Sources ==
- Kääpä, Pietari. Directory of World Cinema: Finland. Intellect 2012, p. 25.
