= Johannes Linnankoski =

Finnish author and playwright (1869–1913)

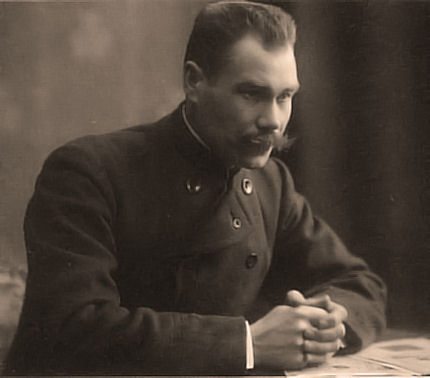
Johannes Linnankoski

Johannes Linnankoski (originally Johannes Vihtori Peltonen, Juho Vihtori Peltonen or Vihtori Johan Peltonen, 18 October 1869 – 10 August 1913) was a Finnish author and playwright, who mainly influenced writing in the Golden Age of Finnish Art. His most famous work is the romance novel, The Song of the Blood-Red Flower (1905). His primary themes were guilt, punishment, and redemption as moral questions.

== Life ==
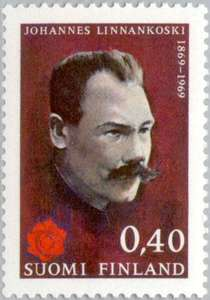
Linnankoski depicted on a post stamp

Linnankoski was born in Vakkola, Askola and was active in the cultural life of Eastern Uusimaa. He was one of the founders of the bank in Porvoo and also founded Finnish-language schools and daily newspapers such as Uusimaa, the first Finnish-language newspaper situated outside of the major towns of Uusimaa.

Linnankoski married Ester Drugg in 1899 and they had four children: Marjatta, Salama, Touko and Urmas. All his children were born under the surname Peltonen.

In his last years he moved from Askola to the Helsinki Deaconess Institute, in Helsinki, for treatment of his poor health, and died there of anemia at the age of 43 in 1913.

In 1938 a Linnankoski Museum was opened near the sauna building where Linnankoski was born.

== Film adaptations ==
His books have been made into numerous major feature films with the most famous and notorious being The Milkmaid (directed by T. J. Särkkä) and Laulu tulipunaisesta kukasta (directed by Mikko Niskanen). The Song of the Blood-Red Flower has also been filmed in Sweden, in three different versions by directors Mauritz Stiller, Per-Axel Branner and Gustaf Molander.

== Bibliography ==
- The Song of the Blood-Red Flower (Laulu tulipunaisesta kukasta, 1905)
- The Fugitives (Pakolaiset, 1908)
- Kootut teokset
