= Erkki Peltonen =

Erik (Erkki) Peltonen (1 May 1861 - 25 January 1942) was a Finnish schoolteacher and politician. He was born in Askola, and was a member of the Diet of Finland from 1905 to 1906 and of the Parliament of Finland from 1908 to 1909, representing the Young Finnish Party.
