= The Song of the Blood-Red Flower =

1905 novel by Johannes Linnankoski

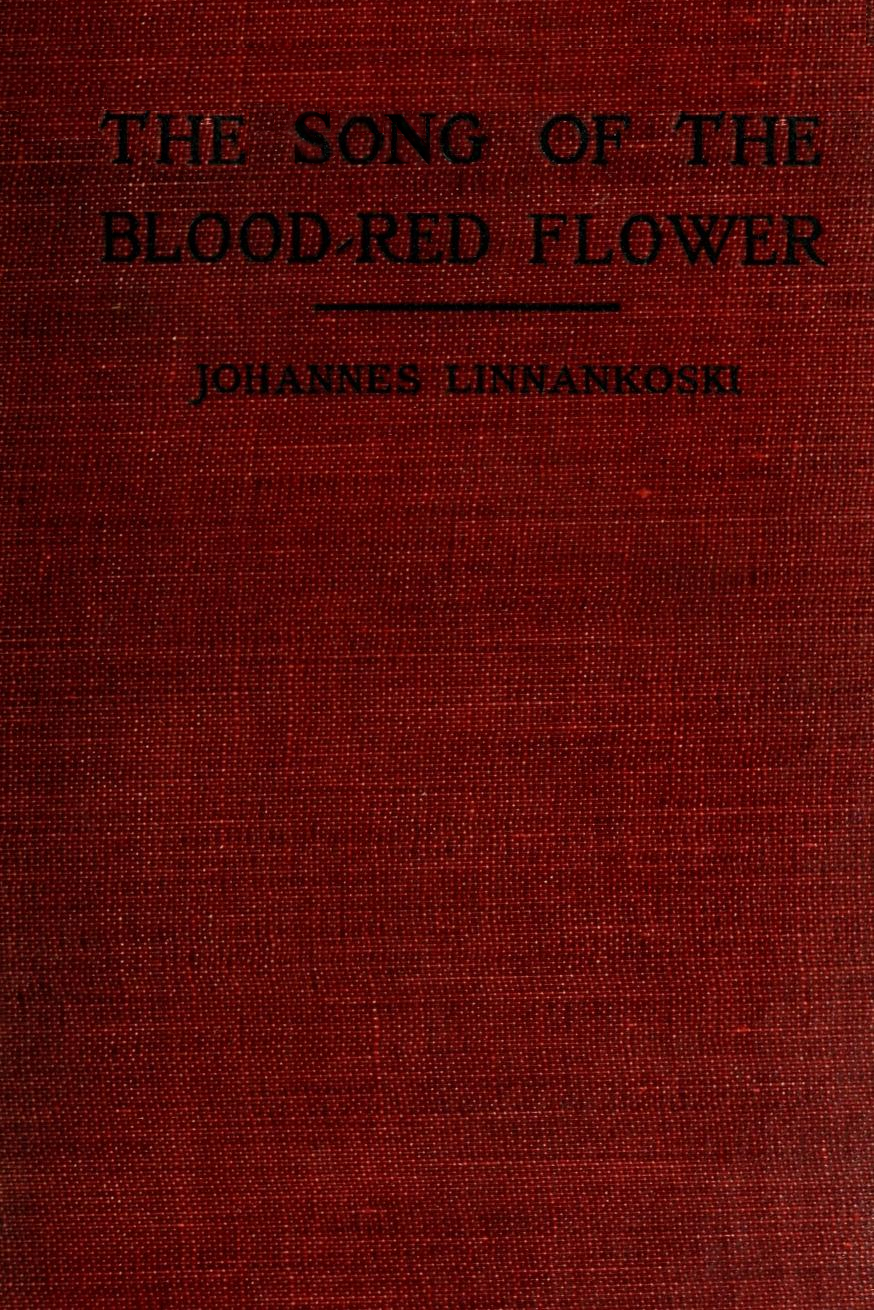
- A hardcover of the 1921 English version
- Author: Johannes Linnankoski
- Original title: Finnish: Laulu tulipunaisesta kukasta
- Translator: W. J. Alexander Worster
- Language: Finnish
- Genre: romance
- Publisher: WSOY (Finnish); Moffat, Yard & Co. (English)
- Publication date: 1905
- Publication place: Finland
- English publication date: 1921; 105 years ago
- Media type: Print (Hardback)
- Pages: 240 (Finnish); 256 (English)
- OCLC: 599685
- Text: The Song of the Blood-Red Flower at Wikisource

The Song of the Blood-Red Flower (Finnish: Laulu tulipunaisesta kukasta) is a romance novel by Finnish writer Johannes Linnankoski, published in 1905; and is considered the author's most famous and personal work. Loosely based on the legend of Don Juan, it tells the story of a young log driver who charms women. It was awarded the State Prize for Literature in 1906, and was also given an award by the Finnish Literature Society. An English version, translated by W. J. Alexander Worster, was first published in 1921 by Moffat, Yard & Co. in New York.

There are five film adaptations of the story (three Swedish and two Finnish); the earliest is the 1919 Swedish silent film The Flame of Life, directed by Mauritz Stiller, and the latest is the 1971 Finnish film adaptation directed by Mikko Niskanen, which is the only color film version. A large number of stage plays have also been made based on the novel, such as H. Välisalmi's play by the Estonian Drama Theatre in 1938, and three Finnish plays at the Pyynikki Summer Theatre, Tampere in 1960, 1981 and 2005.

== Plot summary ==
Olof Koskela is a wanderer and logger known for his ability to win the affection of women. The son of a farmer, he leaves home following an argument with his father and joins a group of log drivers. As he travels with the logs along the River Kohiseva, he becomes romantically involved with the most beautiful girl in each village he passes through.

Rather than using their real names, Olof gives the women descriptive nicknames, such as Clematis, Gazelle, Daisy and Rowan. However, whenever he moves on to a new place, he soon forgets his previous love.

Olof's outlook on life is reflected in his words:

“Only while we are young, only while the flood of youth runs free and bright in our veins can we be happy. And they are the greatest who dare to demand their share of life in full, to plunge unafraid into the waters, letting the waves break on their temples and life's salt flood wash their cheeks.”

Faced with the proud and difficult-to-reach Kyllikki of the Moisio House, Olof can't leave her. He asks host of Moisio for permission to marry Kyllikki, but the request is denied. Olof continues his journey and seduces a few more women, but he repeatedly misses Kyllikki. The separation becomes unbearable and Olof returns to Kyllikki. This time they get married. Olof does not want to start cultivating the inheritance of his family, but decides to start over as a land filler. They build their own house and clear fields. In time, Kyllikki will also become pregnant. However, Olof does not think he has a more light-hearted life and is in great pain as he knows that Kyllikki is still suffering from his old adventures. Olof begins to examine himself until, at the end of the book, he reconciles with his past. Once a young tramp, he has grown into a responsible and aware member of society.

=== Characters ===
- Olof Koskela: The novel's protagonist. Olof is the younger son of a farmer, with a fiery heart and temperament. This flower-to-flower-jumping hero seems to love only the feeling of falling in love, not its potential object.
- Daisy: The light-haired, pink-cheeked maid Olof entices for a ski trip. Olof laments to Daisy how he, a very passionate character, has finally cooled down.
- Hawthorn: A beautiful girl who falls in love with Olof very fervently. Hawthorn even wants to sacrifice her life and die happily for Olof.
- Gazelle: A small and slim girl with hot eyes, long blonde hair and red stockings. As she runs around playing with Olof, he calls her Gazelle; "Gazelle's feet, gazelle's eyes" flash in Olof's mind.
- Clematis: Olof describes the virgin as graceful and gentle, but at the same time, she is "affectionate and connected like a thread in the window tongue, and deep and bottomless like life itself."
- Pansy: Olof describes Pansy as the night: "Stunning and fascinating as night, mysterious and sealed as autumn night, only illuminated by bright flashes of light." She has silky black hair.
- Rowan: A calm and quiet girl with straight brown hair. Olof's autumn girl, who gets her nickname by showing Olof that autumn is beautiful. Olof describes the maiden as a red-berry rowan, which shines on the hillside as the birches turn yellow.
- Forest Fairy: Her real name is Annikki, and is one of the three women Olof calls by her real name.
- Maya Koskela: Olof's deceased sister. Olof imagines Maya talking to him and complaining about playing with girls' hearts. His sister is like a conscience to Olof, trying to get him to do good.
- Kyllikki Moisio: Daughter of the Moisios' host. A representative of sacrificial love, who has the capacity for suffering and just waits in the background. Kyllikki is the only girl Olof wants to marry. Kyllikki is mysterious and proud and does not surrender to Olof very easily.

== Background ==
The roses on the coat of arms of Askola municipality refer to the novel; Linnankoski, who wrote the work, was born in Askola.

When Linnankoski began writing his successful novel in the summer of 1904 at Vuohensaari in Salo, he had no actual written plan for the plot. However, he had been thinking about the subject for many years before writing, so the final writing was quick and easy. Writing was not nearly as cumbersome as writing his first successful play, Eternal Struggle (Ikuinen taistelu) in 1903. In The Song of the Blood-Red Flower, Linnankoski made extensive use of his own experiences. He had lived a youth full of passion and controversy, but had been married for a few years to Ester Drugg (1872–1943) when he wrote the book. When trying to write, he wanted to be as truthful as possible in his narrative. The role models and the people and events that ended up in the book were close to each other, but there was no direct reproduction; Linnankoski edited and selected them for his own use. Linnankoski was greatly influenced in the events of the book by his youthful landscape in Vakkola, Askola, where he was born; the Kohiseva River, mentioned in the book, might have been inspired by the Porvoo River across the Vakkola village.

== Themes ==
From the outset, the basic themes of Linnankoski's literary work have been implicated in his production, including The Song of the Blood-Red Flower: love, the struggle between good and evil in man himself and growth as a human, and the resulting moral problems of guilt, punishment, and atonement for the past. For Linnankoski, the Bible was the basic work that, at an ethical level, shaped his worldview. He saw earthly life as a unique event for which man himself and alone is responsible. Linnankoski had three ideas that he cherished and implemented in his own life and in his literary production: educating the people, strengthening the Finnish national identity, and the humanity hidden in every person.

== Reception ==
After its release, The Song of the Blood-Red Flower received good reviews and excellent sales success. The book was published in the spring, but the second edition was ordered in early autumn. The publisher suggested to Linnankoski that he remove a redundant chapter from the new edition, and put forward various suggestions for improvement. However, Linnankoski retained the original text and no changes were made.

The Song of the Blood-Red Flower is one of the best-selling works of Finnish fiction and, alongside the Kalevala by Elias Lönnrot and Seitsemän veljestä by Aleksis Kivi, the most internationally known product of Finnish literature; it has also been translated into 19 languages, including Czech, Slovak, and Latvian . It brought Johannes Linnankoski instant literary fame among the people, and his reputation extended beyond the borders of his country. In France, for example, over 50 editions have so far been translated.

Despite its great popularity, the romantic scenes in the book, with all their passion, also aroused controversy at the time, some claiming that the scenes appear to be almost obscene.

== Adaptations ==
=== Films ===
- The Flame of Life, AKA The Song of the Scarlet Flower (Sången om den eldröda blomman, 1919), directed by Mauritz Stiller
- Man's Way with Women (Sången om den eldröda blomman, 1934), directed by Per-Axel Branner
- The Song of the Scarlet Flower (Laulu tulipunaisesta kukasta, 1938), directed by Teuvo Tulio
- The Song of the Scarlet Flower (Sången om den eldröda blomman, 1956), directed by Gustaf Molander
- The Song of the Blood-Red Flower (Laulu tulipunaisesta kukasta, 1971), directed by Mikko Niskanen

== See also ==
- Finnish literature in 20th century
- Romance novel
- The Song of the Red Ruby
