= The Song of the Scarlet Flower (1956 film) =

1956 film directed by Gustaf Molander

- Directed by: Gustaf Molander
- Written by: Rune Lindström
- Based on: The Song of the Blood-Red Flower by Johannes Linnankoski
- Produced by: Allan Ekelund
- Starring: Jarl Kulle; Anita Björk; Ulla Jacobsson
- Cinematography: Åke Dahlqvist
- Edited by: Oscar Rosander
- Music by: Erland von Koch
- Production company: Svensk Filmindustri
- Distributed by: Svensk Filmindustri; Constantin Film (W. Germany)
- Release date: 26 December 1956
- Running time: 104 minutes
- Country: Sweden
- Language: Swedish

The Song of the Scarlet Flower (Swedish: Sången om den eldröda blomman) is a 1956 Swedish drama film directed by Gustaf Molander and starring Jarl Kulle, Anita Björk and Ulla Jacobsson. It was shot at the Råsunda Studios in Stockholm. The film's sets were designed by the art director P.A. Lundgren. It is one of several film adaptations of the 1905 novel The Song of the Blood-Red Flower by Finnish author Johannes Linnankoski.

== Cast ==
- Jarl Kulle as Olof Koskela
- Anita Björk as Kyllikki Malm
- Ulla Jacobsson as Elli
- Ann-Marie Gyllenspetz as Annika
- Marianne Bengtsson as Maria
- Linnéa Hillberg as Olof's Mother
- Gunnel Lindblom as Kerstin
- Fylgia Zadig as Rosa
- Monica Nielsen as Britta
- Edvin Adolphson as Malm
- Axel Slangus as Väinö
- Olof Bergström as Kaleb
- Erik 'Bullen' Berglund as Olof's Father
- Ingvar Kjellson as Falk
- Sven-Eric Gamble as Stoker
- Ernst Brunman as Wedding Guest
- Arthur Fischer as Wedding Guest
- Birger Lensander as Man in Village
- Åke Lindström as Raftsman
- Gustaf Hedström as Vicar
- Hortensia Hedström as Vicar's Wife
- Marrit Ohlsson as Maid
- Birger Åsander as Farm Hand

== Bibliography ==
- Iverson, Gunnar, Soderbergh Widding, Astrid & Soila, Tytti. Nordic National Cinemas. Routledge, 2005.
- Qvist, Per Olov & von Bagh, Peter. Guide to the Cinema of Sweden and Finland. Greenwood Publishing Group, 2000.
