= Juho Laakso =

Finnish politician (1854–1915)

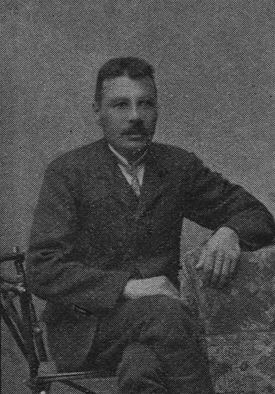

Johan (Juho) Erik Laakso (4 October 1854 – 23 September 1915; original surname Forsell) was a Finnish tenant farmer and politician, born in Askola. He was a member of the Parliament of Finland from 1907 to 1908, representing the Social Democratic Party of Finland (SDP).
