= Uusimaa (newspaper) =

Newspaper published in Porvoo, Finland

Uusimaa logo

Uusimaa (Finnish pronunciation: [ˈuːsiˌmɑː]) is a morning broadsheet newspaper published in Finland. It is based in Porvoo. The circulation of the paper was 10,767 copies in 2013.
