= Porvoonjoki =

Coordinates: 60°23′N 25°40′E

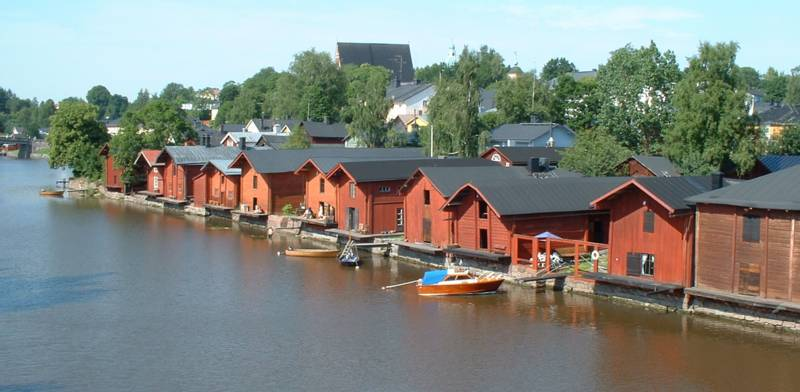

Location
- Country: Finland

Physical characteristics
- Source
  - location: Salpausselkä
  - elevation: 68 m (223 ft)
- Mouth
  - location: Gulf of Finland
- Length: 143 km (89 mi)
- Basin size: 1,271 km^{2} (491 sq mi)
- Discharge
  - average: 100 to 200 m^{3}/s (3,500 to 7,100 cu ft/s)

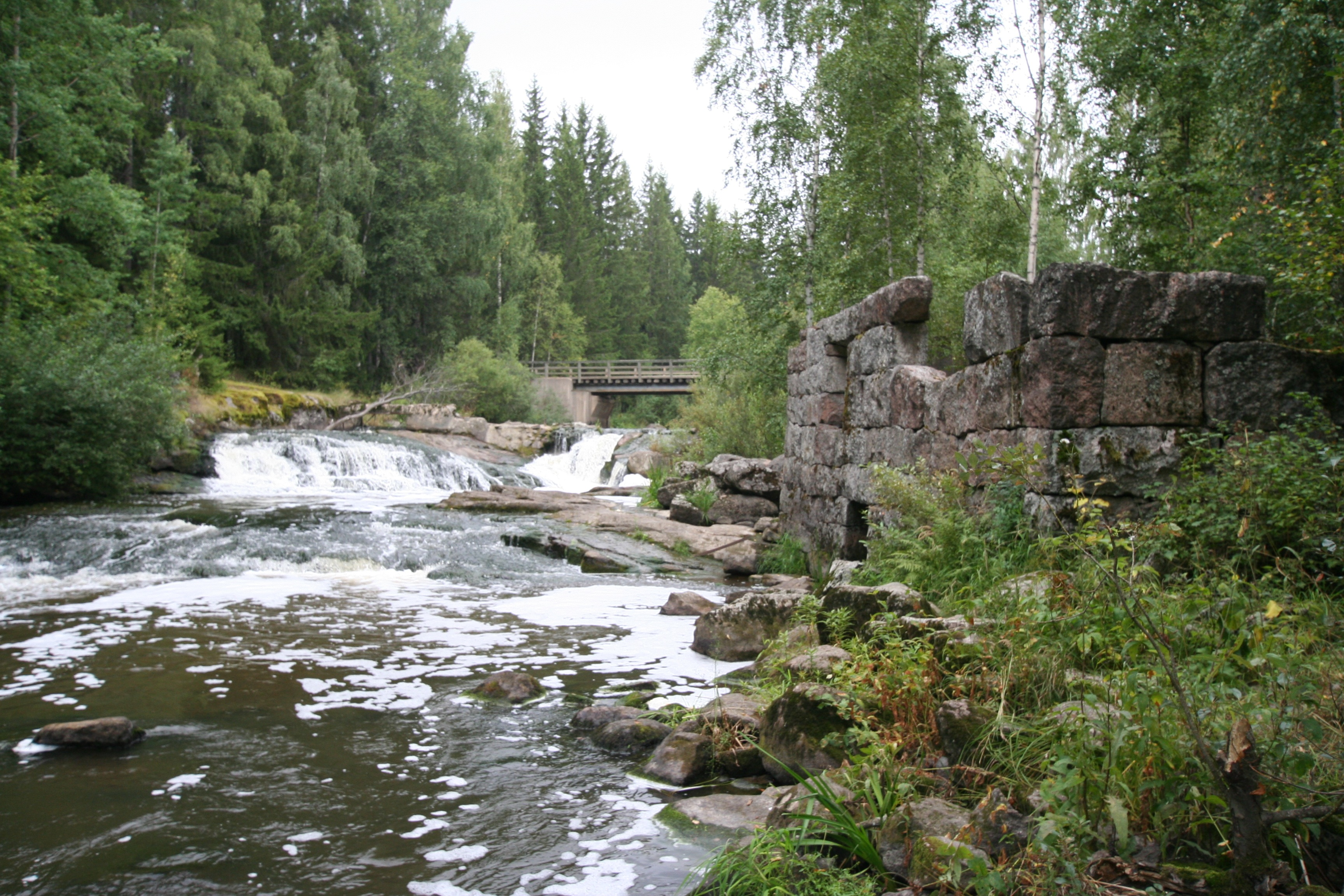
Rapid in Orimattila, Virenoja

Porvoonjoki (Porvoo River, Swedish: Borgå å) is a small river in Finland. The medieval town of Porvoo is situated in the river delta. It is the main river of the Porvoonjoki drainage system, the sources of which are located on the southern slopes of Salpausselkä in Kärkölä, Hollola and Lahti. The river flows through Orimattila, Pukkila, Askola and Porvoo into the Gulf of Finland. The agricultural landscape of the Porvoo River with its ancient settlements, villages and manors together with the old town of Porvoo is part of the national landscapes of Finland.

Porvoonjoki was originally a trade route for the Tavastians and its original name may have been Kukinjoki. The name would have its roots in the Friesian nomenclature of kugg, which would correspond to other similar trading places on the coast.

== See also ==
- Kymijoki
- Vantaanjoki
