= Askola =

Municipality in Uusimaa, Finland

- Municipality
- Askolan kunta Askola kommun
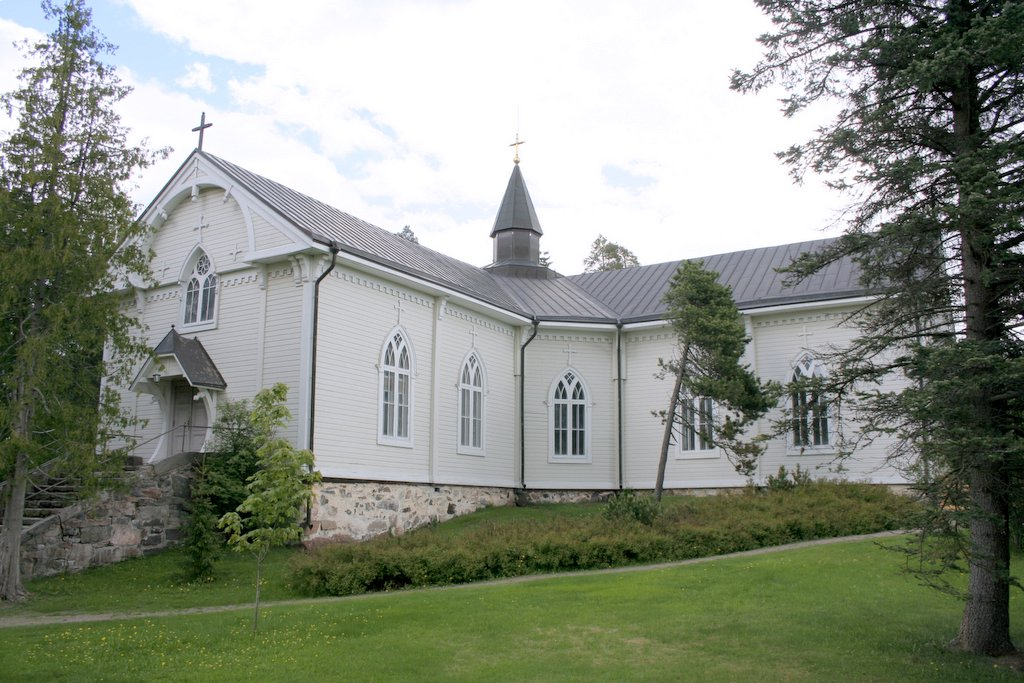
- Askola church

- Coat of arms

- Location of Askola in Finland
- Interactive map of Askola
- Coordinates: 60°31.7′N 025°36′E
- Country: Finland
- Region: Uusimaa
- Sub-region: Porvoo
- Charter: 1896

Government
  - Municipal manager: Annu Räsänen

Area (2018-01-01)
  - Total: 218.03 km^{2} (84.18 sq mi)
  - Land: 212.44 km^{2} (82.02 sq mi)
  - Water: 5.61 km^{2} (2.17 sq mi)
  - Rank: 260th largest in Finland

Population (2025-12-31)
  - Total: 4,677
  - Rank: 172nd largest in Finland
  - Density: 22.02/km^{2} (57.0/sq mi)

Population by native language
  - Finnish: 92.3% (official)
  - Swedish: 3.9%
  - Others: 3.8%

Population by age
  - 0 to 14: 18.7%
  - 15 to 64: 61%
  - 65 or older: 20.2%
- Time zone: UTC+02:00 (EET)
  - Summer (DST): UTC+03:00 (EEST)
- Climate: Dfb
- Website: askola.fi

Askola (Finnish pronunciation: [ˈɑskolɑ]) is a municipality of Finland. It is located in the Uusimaa region. The municipality has a population of 4,677 (31 December 2025) and covers an area of 218.03 square kilometres (84.18 sq mi) of which 5.61 km^{2} (2.17 sq mi) is water. The population density is 22.02 inhabitants per square kilometre (57.0/sq mi). Monninkylä is the largest village of the municipality in terms of population (1,326 inhabitants). Neighbouring municipalities are Myrskylä, Mäntsälä, Pornainen, Porvoo and Pukkila.

The municipality is unilingually Finnish. Askola is one of three municipalities in the Uusimaa region that do not have a Swedish name; the others are Nurmijärvi and Mäntsälä.

== History ==
The Askola parish was part of Porvoo until 1639, when it became a chapel parish, and finally became independent in 1896. The Askola church was completed in 1799.

The coat of arms of the municipality seeks influence from the history of the parish; the millstone is reminiscent of the Askolas's many mills and famous breads, while the roses of the coat of arms refer to Finnish author Johannes Linnankoski, who was born and influenced in Askola, whose most famous work was The Song of the Blood-Red Flower.

== Geography ==
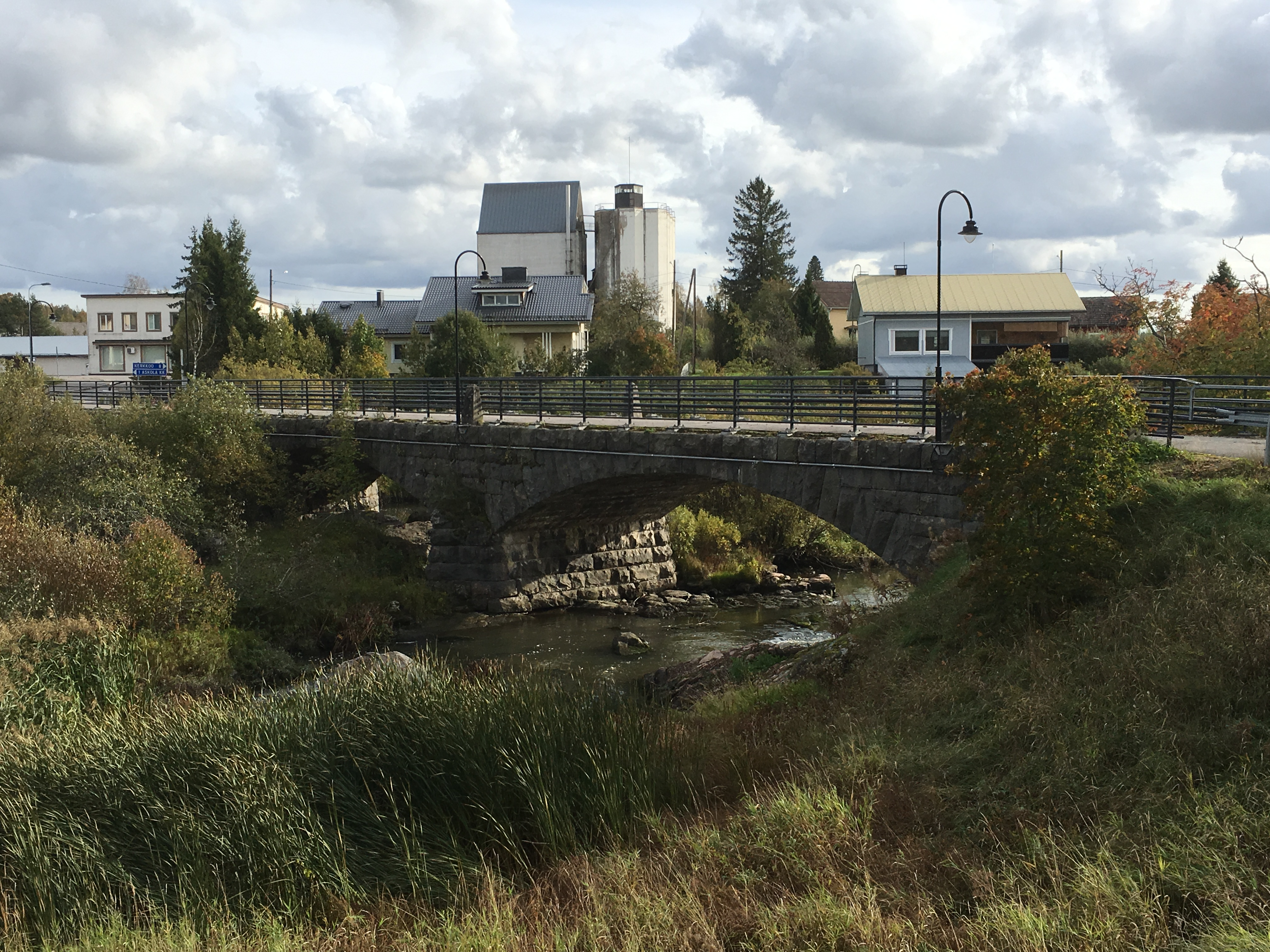
The Vakkola village

The most significant waters in Askola includes the Porvoonjoki flowing from the center of Askola between Orimattila and Porvoo, and eleven lakes in the eastern part of the municipality.

There are no Natura 2000 sites in Askola, but instead five rock areas have been classified as nationally valuable. In one of them, Kirnukallio, are the well-known Askola's glacial potholes. The nationally valuable landscape area of the Porvoonjoki also extends into Askola. Prestbacka Manor and Pappilanharju's natural reserve are also protected as cultural landscapes.

=== Villages ===
In 1967, Askola had 12 legally recognized villages (henkikirjakylät):

- Askola
- Huuvari
- Juornaankylä
- Korttia
- Monninkylä
- Nalkkila
- Nieto
- Puharonkimaa
- Särkijärvi
- Tiilää
- Vahijärvi
- Vakkola

== Demographics ==
In 2020, 18.7% of the population of Askola was under the age of 15, 61.0% were aged 15 to 64, and 20.2% were over the age of 65. The average age was 42.3, under the national average of 43.4 but above the regional average of 41.0. Speakers of Finnish made up 93.7% of the population and speakers of Swedish made up 3.4%, while the share of speakers of foreign languages was 2.9%. Foreign nationals made up 1.8% of the total population.

The chart below, describing the development of the total population of Askola from 1975 to 2020, encompasses the municipality's area as of 2021.

Historical population

Year	Pop.	±% p.a.
1975	3,630	—
1980	4,058	+2.25%
1985	4,130	+0.35%
1990	4,248	+0.57%
1995	4,269	+0.10%

Year	Pop.	±% p.a.
2000	4,389	+0.56%
2005	4,555	+0.75%
2010	4,864	+1.32%
2015	5,104	+0.97%
2020	4,878	−0.90%

Source: Statistics Finland

=== Urban areas ===
In 2019, out of the total population of 4,943, 2,636 people lived in urban areas and 2,251 in sparsely populated areas, while the coordinates of 56 people were unknown. This made Askola's degree of urbanization 53.9%. The urban population in the municipality was divided between two urban areas as follows:

#	Urban area	Population
1	Monninkylä	1,324
2	Askola parish village	1,312

== Services ==
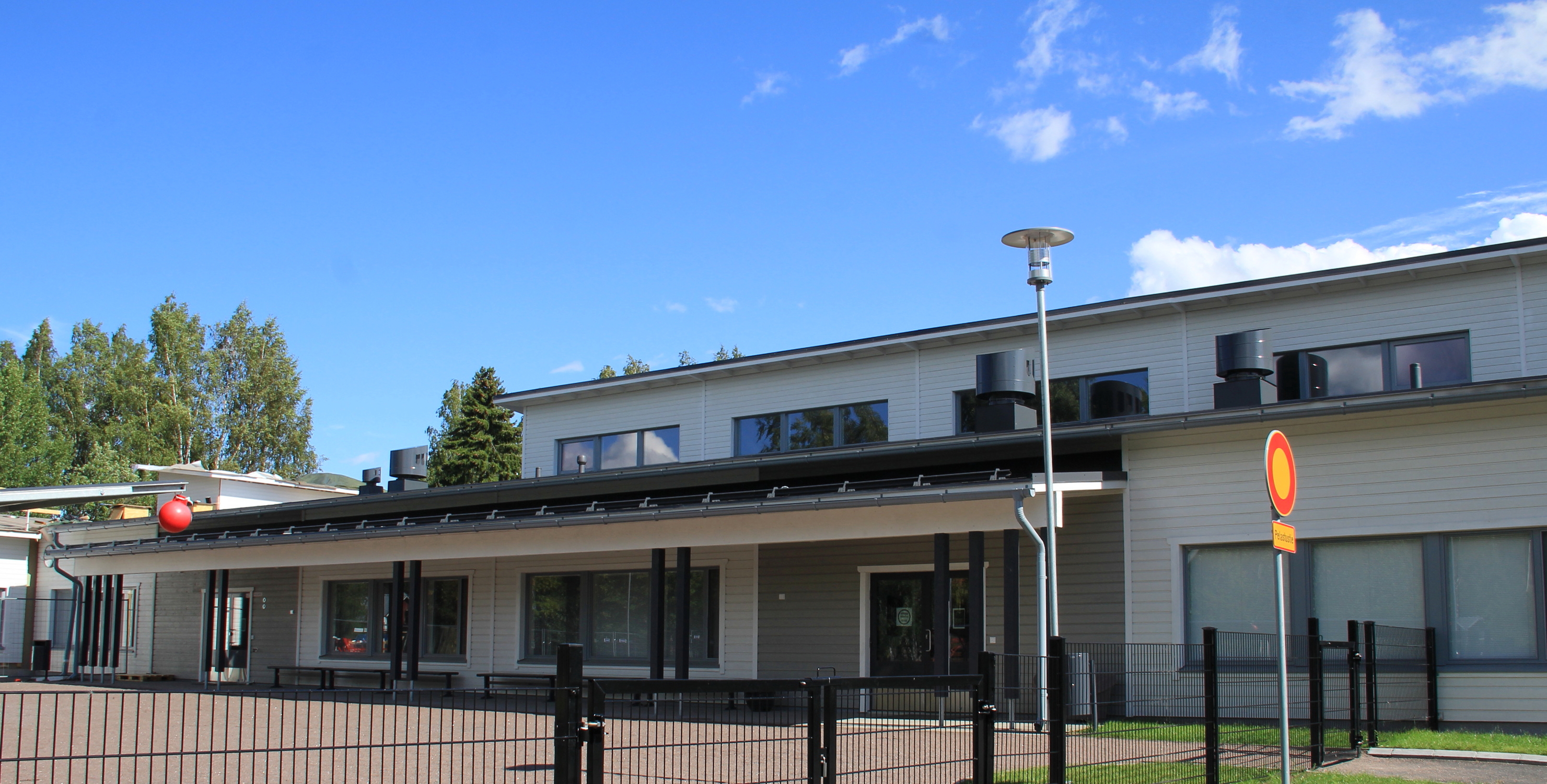
Monninkylä school

Askola has four primary schools, and two secondary schools, as well as one vocational school. Both secondary schools also receive students from the neighboring municipality of Pukkila, which does not have its own post-primary school education.

The Askola's library operates in six locations: the church village, Monninkylä and four schools of the municipality.

Public health care is provided at the Askola Health Center.

There are two Sale grocery stores in the municipality: one in the church village and the other in Monninkylä. In 2021, locals said they wanted a third grocery store from a competing chain, such as Kesko or Lidl.

== Politics ==
Results of the 2011 Finnish parliamentary election in Askola:

- True Finns 32.1%
- Centre Party 21.9%
- National Coalition Party 16.1%
- Social Democratic Party 14.8%
- Green League 5.4%
- Left Alliance 5.0%
- Christian Democrats 1.8%
- Swedish People's Party 1,6%

== Economy ==
In 2018, 8.1% of the workforce of Askola worked in primary production (agriculture, forestry and fishing), 36.2% in secondary production (e.g. manufacturing, construction and infrastructure), and 53.1% in services. In 2019, the unemployment rate was 6.7%, and the share of pensioners in the population was 23.0%.

The ten largest employers in Askola in 2019 were as follows:

1. TerraWise Oy, 323 employees
2. Municipality of Askola, 293 employees
3. Hakevuori Oy, 37 employees
4. Fimet Oy, 35 employees
5. Eteva kuntayhtymä, 31 employees
6. Kuljetusliike M. Lindberg Oy, 30 employees
7. SimFors Oy, 28 employees
8. Kymppirakenne Oy, 27 employees
9. Oy Meyer vastus Ab, 25 employees
10. Ginola Oy, 25 employees

== People born in Askola ==
- Juho Laakso (1854–1915)
- Erkki Peltonen (1861–1942)
- Johannes Linnankoski (1869–1913)
- Oskar Kumpu (1889–1935)
