= Gallen-Kallela Museum =

The Gallen-Kallela Museum
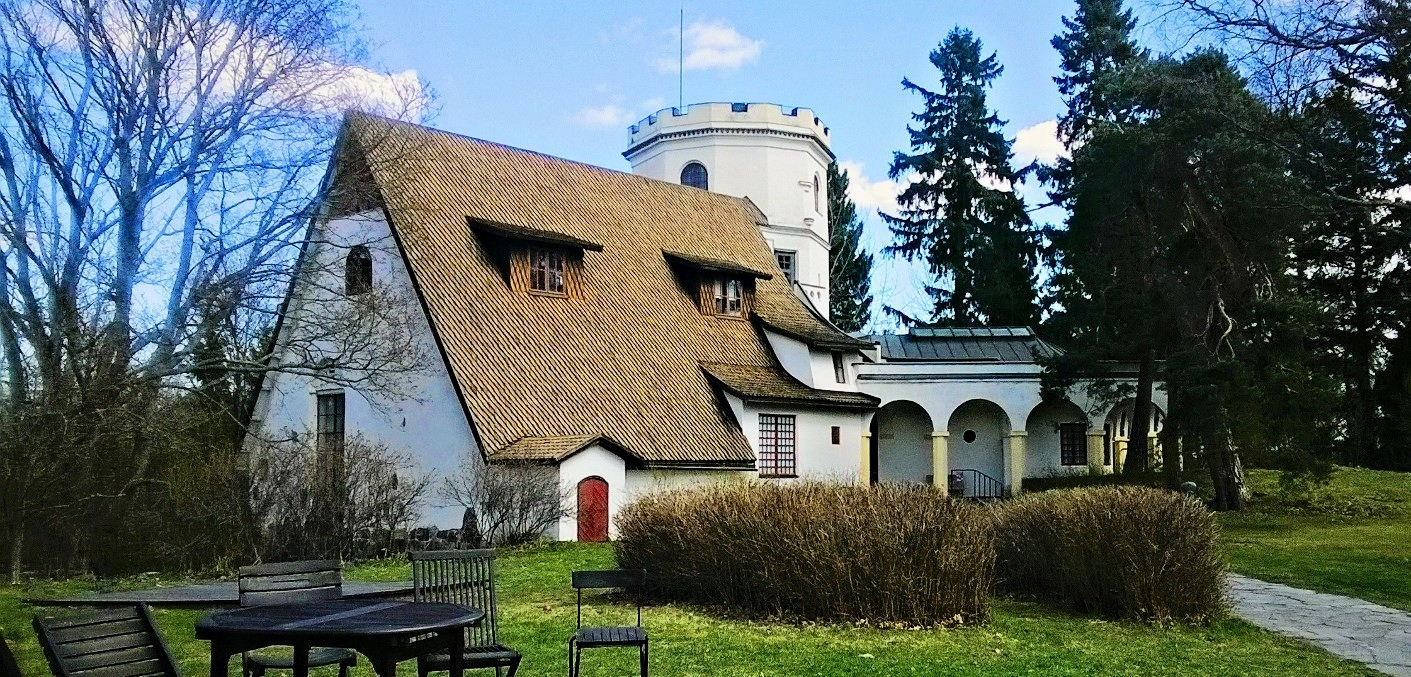
- Tarvaspää in spring, 2017
- Established: 1961
- Location: Tarvaspää, Espoo, Finland
- Coordinates: 60°12′23″N 024°50′18″E
- Type: Art museum
- Website: www.gallen-kallela.fi

The Gallen-Kallela Museum, located in Tarvaspää, Espoo, Finland, and built between 1911 and 1913 was a home and studio for Finnish painter Akseli Gallen-Kallela. The atelier building has been a museum since 1961.

== Gallery ==
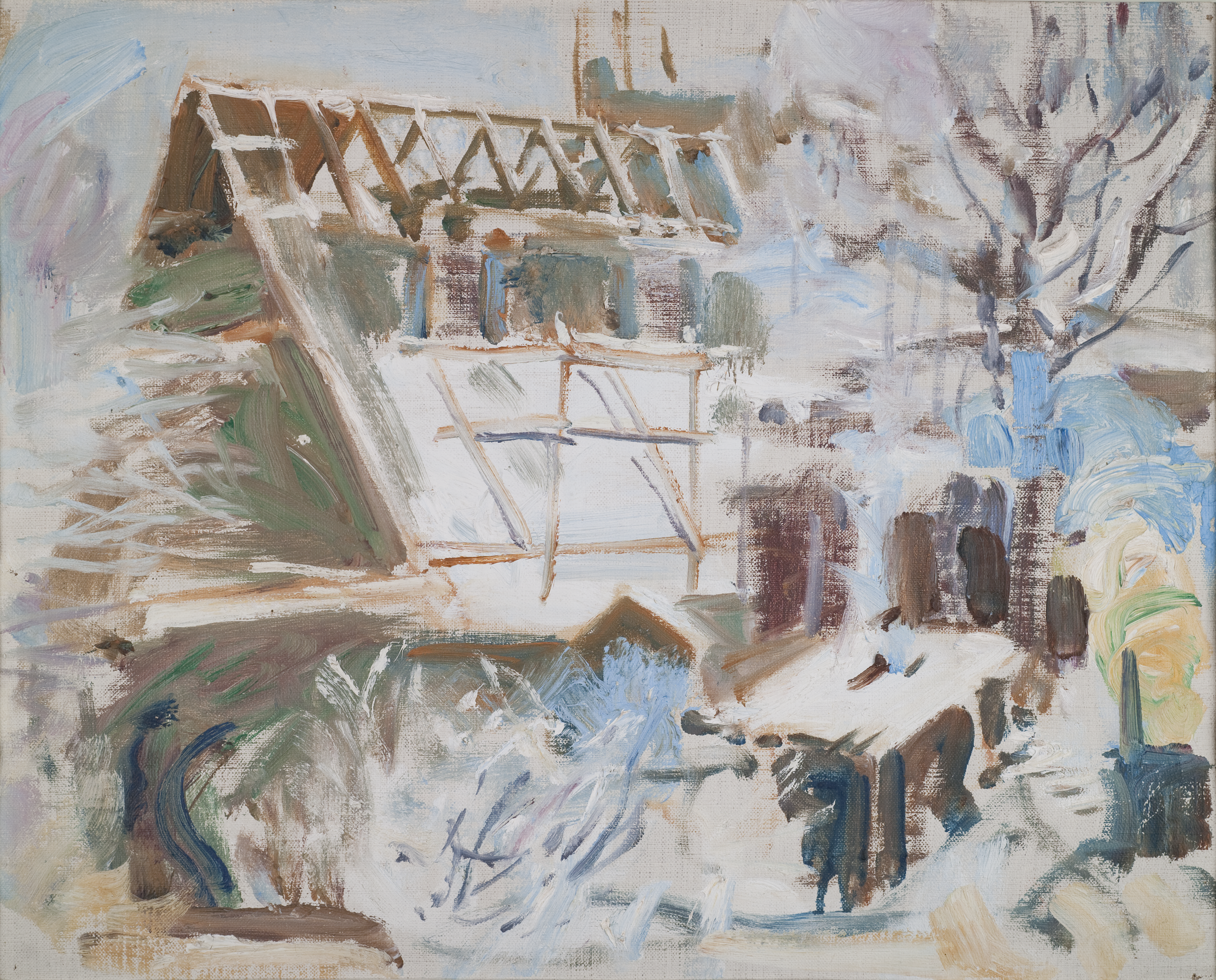
Under construction, Gallen-Kallela's sketch from 1912

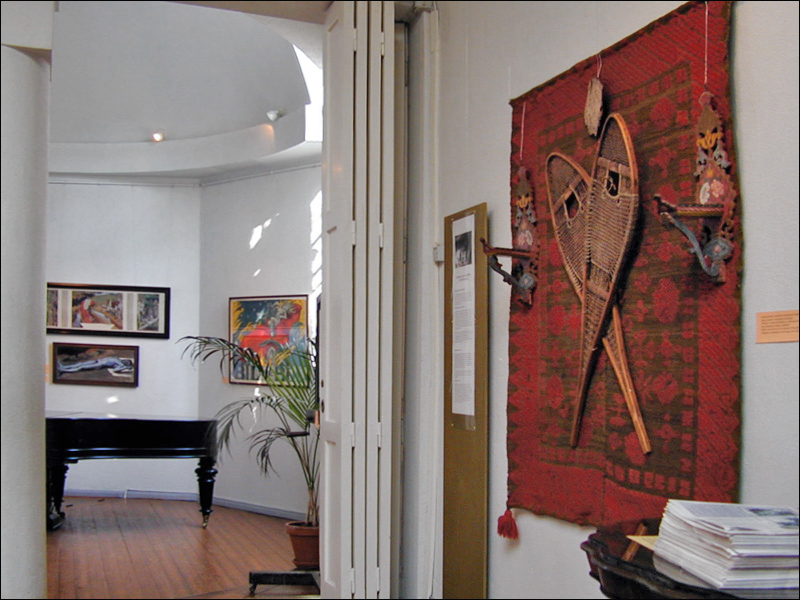
Interior in 2013

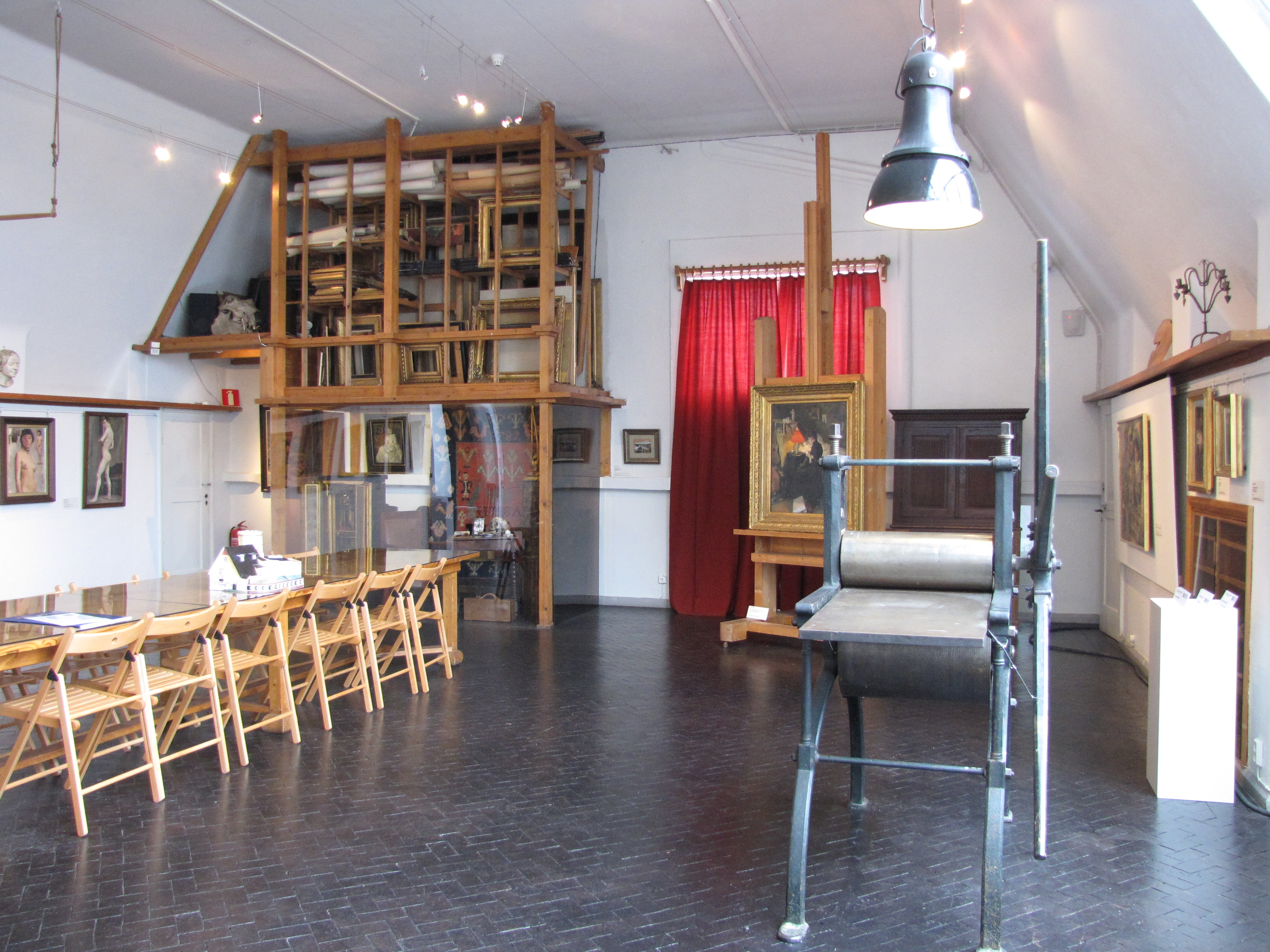
Interior in 2011

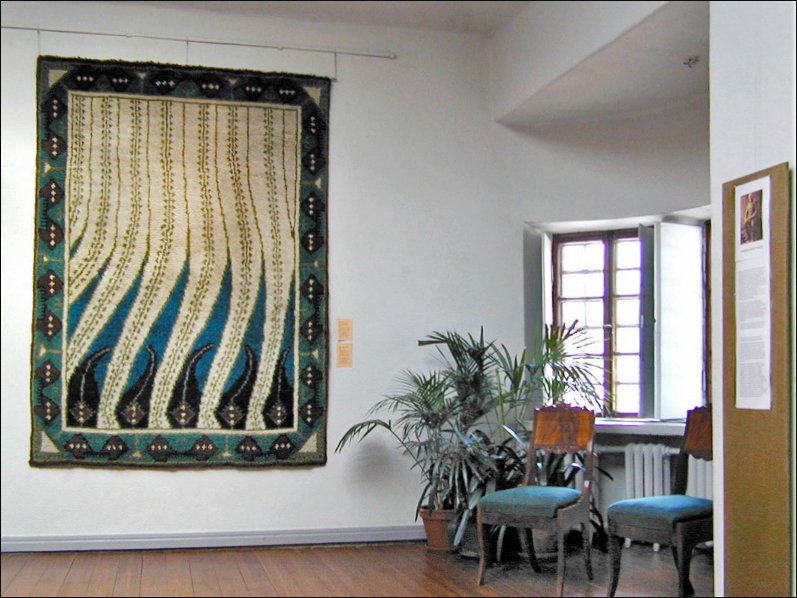
Liekki ryijy
