= Eastern Uusimaa =

Former region of Finland

Eastern Uusimaa Itä-Uusimaa Itä-Uudenmaan maakunta (Finnish) landskapet Östra Nyland (Swedish)
- Region
- Coat of arms

- Eastern Uusimaa on a map of Finland
- Coordinates: 60°30′N 26°00′E
- Country: Finland
- Historical province: Uusimaa
- Capital: Porvoo

Area
  - Total: 2,800.28 km^{2} (1,081.19 sq mi)

Population (2009)
  - Total: 95,300
  - Density: 34.0/km^{2} (88.1/sq mi)
- NUTS: 182
- Regional bird: Swallow (Hirundo rustica)
- Regional fish: Trout (Salmo trutta)
- Regional flower: Coltsfoot (Tussilago farfara)
- Website: ita-uusimaa.fi

Eastern Uusimaa or, officially, Itä-Uusimaa (Finnish: Itä-Uusimaa; Swedish: Östra Nyland; literally "Eastern New Land") was one of the 19 regions of Finland, until it consolidated with the region of Uusimaa on 1 January 2011. It bordered the regions of Uusimaa, Päijät-Häme and Kymenlaakso.

== Municipalities ==
The region of Eastern Uusimaa was made up of seven municipalities, of which two had city status (marked in bold). Finnish names of the various municipalities are given in brackets next to the English-usage name.

Loviisa Sub-region:

- Lapinjärvi (Lappträsk)
- **Loviisa** (Lovisa)

Porvoo Sub-region:

- Askola
- Myrskylä (Mörskom)
- **Porvoo** (Borgå)
- Pukkila
- Sipoo (Sibbo)^{*}

^{*} - transferred to the Helsinki sub-region of the Uusimaa region on 1 January 2011
