= Uusimaa =

Region of Finland

Uusimaa Nyland
- Region
- Region of Uusimaa; Uudenmaan maakunta (Finnish); Landskapet Nyland (Swedish)
- Flag Coat of arms
- Anthem: Uusmaalaisten laulu
- Uusimaa in red on a map of Finland
- Coordinates: 60°15′N 24°30′E
- Country: Finland
- Historical province: Uusimaa
- Capital: Helsinki
- Other cities and towns: Espoo, Hanko, Hyvinkää, Järvenpää, Karkkila, Kauniainen, Kerava, Lohja, Loviisa, Porvoo, Raseborg and Vantaa

Government
  - Regional Mayor: Ossi Savolainen
  - President of the Council: Eero Heinäluoma

Area
  - Total: 9,568 km^{2} (3,694 sq mi)

Population (December 31, 2022)
  - Total: 1,734,000
  - Density: 181/km^{2} (470/sq mi)
- Demonym(s): uusmaalainen (Finnish) nylänning (Swedish)

GDP
  - Total: €105.831 billion (2022)
- Time zone: UTC+2 (EET)
  - Summer (DST): UTC+3 (EEST)
- ISO 3166 code: FI-18
- NUTS: 181
  - HDI (2021): 0.960 very high
- Regional bird: Blackbird
- Regional fish: Zander
- Regional flower: Windflower
- Regional animal: European hedgehog
- Regional stone: Hornblende
- Regional lake: Lake Tuusula
- Website: uudenmaanliitto.fi

Uusimaa (Finnish: [ˈuːsimɑː]; Swedish: Nyland, Finland Swedish: [ˈnyːlɑnd]) is a region of Finland. It borders the regions of Southwest Finland, Kanta-Häme, Päijät-Häme, and Kymenlaakso. Finland's capital and largest city, Helsinki, along with its surrounding metropolitan area, is located in the Uusimaa region, which is Finland's most populous region. Its population is 1,734,000.

== History ==
From the time of the Vikings in the 8th century, an eastern road ran along the Gulf of Finland. The first inhabitants were nomads. The place name of Nuuksio derives from the Sami word njukča which means 'swan'. Later Finns proper and Tavastians inhabited the area. Some place names have traces of Tavastian village names, like Konala, which likely derives from the older Tavastian village name Konhola. Estonians inhabited the region to a smaller extent, specifically for seasonal fishing.

Swedish colonisation of coastal Uusimaa started after the second crusade to Finland in the 13th century. The colonisation was part of converting pagan areas to Catholicism. Eastern Uusimaa had its first Christian Swedish colonialists earlier than the western part, which got its colonialists in one mass transfer of people to Porvoo in the 14th century. The colonisation was supported by the Swedish kingdom and the immigrants were provided with grain seeds and cattle. They also got a four-year tax exemption from the crown. All the Swedish place names of Uusimaa date back to this period.

The names Uusimaa and Nyland, meaning 'new land' in English, derived from the Swedish colonisation era. The Swedish-language name Nyland appears in documents from the 14th century. The Finnish-language name Uusimaa appears for the first time in 1548 as Wsimaa in the first translation of the New Testament to Finnish by Mikael Agricola. Much of Uusimaa is literally new – it has risen off the Baltic Sea due to post-glacial rebound.

The Finnish provinces (lääni, län) were ceded to Russian Empire after the Finnish War in 1809, when they were organized as the Grand Duchy of Finland. Finland became independent in 1917.

The provincial system was restructured in 1997, and from 1997 to 2010 Uusimaa formed a part of the Southern Finland Province. The provincial system was abolished in 2010 in favour of regions (maakunta, landskap). The regions had traditionally existed as cultural units but were made into administrative units in 1994. Initially, Uusimaa was divided into the regions of Uusimaa and Eastern Uusimaa, but in 2011 the two regions were merged into a single region, Uusimaa.

== Heraldry ==
The coat of arms features two silver, wavy fesses on a blue field, with a golden boat with a rudder between them. The boat symbolizes the coastal character of the region, while the silver fesses may represent its rivers.

Uusimaa Province received its coat of arms at the end of the 16th century, and it is attested in 1599. In 1997, when the regional system was formalized, the traditional provincial coat of arms was adopted as the coat of arms of the Uusimaa region.

== Municipalities ==
The region of Uusimaa consists of four sub-regions and 26 municipalities, 13 of which have city status (marked in bold).

=== Municipalities on the map ===
Cities and municipalities of Uusimaa.

=== Sub-regions ===
Helsinki sub-region

- **Espoo** (Esbo)
- **Helsinki** (Helsingfors)
- **Hyvinkää** (Hyvinge)
- **Järvenpää** (Träskända)
- **Karkkila** (Högfors)
- **Kauniainen** (Grankulla)
- **Kerava** (Kervo)
- Kirkkonummi (Kyrkslätt)
- **Lohja** (Lojo)
- Mäntsälä
- Nurmijärvi
- Pornainen (Borgnäs)
- Sipoo (Sibbo)
- Siuntio (Sjundeå)
- Tuusula (Tusby)
- **Vantaa** (Vanda)
- Vihti (Vichtis)

Loviisa sub-region

- Lapinjärvi (Lappträsk)
- **Loviisa** (Lovisa)

Raseborg sub-region

- **Hanko** (Hangö)
- Ingå (Inkoo)
- **Raseborg** (Raasepori)

Porvoo sub-region

- Askola
- Myrskylä (Mörskom)
- **Porvoo** (Borgå)
- Pukkila

=== Municipalities listed ===
Coat of arms	Municipality	Population	Land area (km^{2})	Density (/km^{2})	Finnish speakers	Swedish speakers	Other speakers
coat of arms of Askola	Askola	4,677	212	22	92 %	4 %	4 %
coat of arms of Espoo	Espoo	325,716	312	1,043	68 %	6 %	26 %
coat of arms of Hanko	Hanko	7,620	117	65	52 %	41 %	7 %
coat of arms of Helsinki	Helsinki	694,392	214	3,238	73 %	5 %	21 %
coat of arms of Hyvinkää	Hyvinkää	47,015	323	146	90 %	1 %	9 %
coat of arms of Ingå	Ingå	5,391	351	15	44 %	51 %	5 %
coat of arms of Järvenpää	Järvenpää	46,944	38	1,251	89 %	1 %	10 %
coat of arms of Karkkila	Karkkila	8,274	242	34	91 %	1 %	9 %
coat of arms of Kauniainen	Kauniainen	10,318	6	1,752	59 %	30 %	11 %
coat of arms of Kerava	Kerava	38,767	31	1,266	81 %	1 %	18 %
coat of arms of Kirkkonummi	Kirkkonummi	41,725	367	114	72 %	14 %	13 %
coat of arms of Lapinjärvi	Lapinjärvi	2,430	330	7	64 %	29 %	8 %
coat of arms of Lohja	Lohja	45,435	940	48	89 %	3 %	7 %
coat of arms Loviisa	Loviisa	14,196	820	17	55 %	39 %	6 %
coat of arms of Myrskylä	Myrskylä	1,692	200	8	87 %	9 %	4 %
coat of arms of Mäntsälä	Mäntsälä	20,861	581	36	93 %	1 %	6 %
coat of arms of Nurmijärvi	Nurmijärvi	45,333	362	125	90 %	1 %	8 %
coat of arms of Pornainen	Pornainen	4,919	147	34	94 %	2 %	4 %
coat of arms of Porvoo	Porvoo	51,863	655	79	63 %	27 %	10 %
coat of arms of Pukkila	Pukkila	1,720	145	12	95 %	1 %	5 %
coat of arms of Raseborg	Raseborg	26,856	1,149	23	30 %	63 %	6 %
coat of arms of Sipoo	Sipoo	23,006	340	68	65 %	27 %	8 %
coat of arms of Siuntio	Siuntio	6,192	241	26	65 %	26 %	9 %
coat of arms of Tuusula	Tuusula	42,479	220	193	90 %	1 %	9 %
coat of arms of Vantaa	Vantaa	252,956	238	1,061	68 %	2 %	30 %
coat of arms of Vihti	Vihti	28,852	522	55	91 %	2 %	8 %
	Total	1,799,629	9,103	198	70 %	7 %	20 %

== Places of interest ==
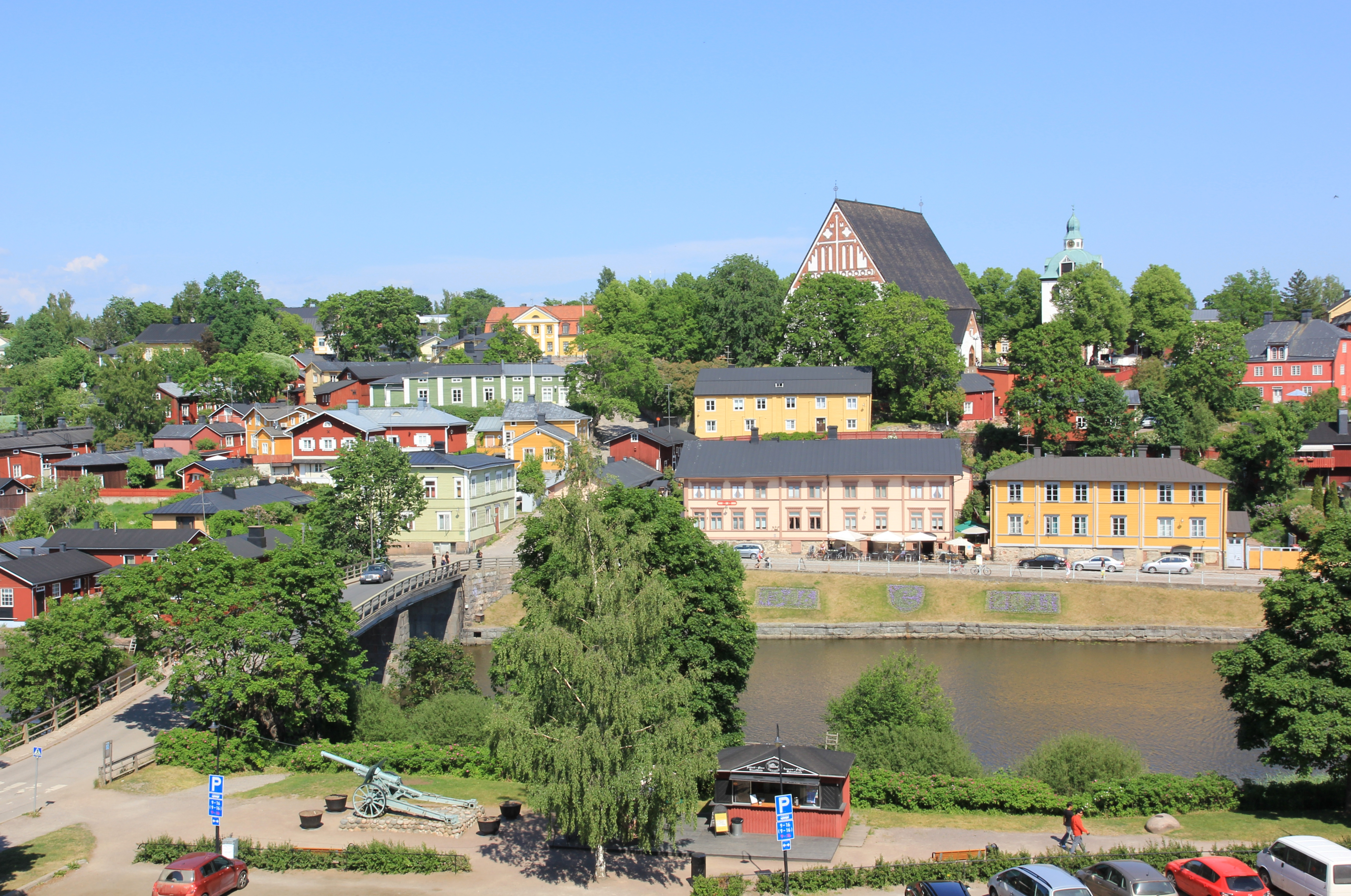
A historical old town of Porvoo

Uusimaa, the region surrounding Finland’s capital Helsinki, offers many sights and attractions, from historical landmarks to natural wonders.

- Amusement parks: Linnanmäki, Serena Waterpark
- Castles and fortresses: Suomenlinna, Raseborg Castle, Svartholm fortress, Musto Castle
- Churches and cathedrals: Helsinki Cathedral, Porvoo Cathedral, Espoo Cathedral, Temppeliaukio Church, Sipoo Old Church, Church of St. Lawrence, Vantaa
- Harbour: Hanko and Hauensuoli
- Historical houses: Seurasaari, Parliament House, Helsinki, Paikkari croft, Glims, Hvitträsk, Alikartano, Malmgård Mansion
- Ironworks: Fiskars Bruk, Billnäs Bruk, Fagervik Brik, Strömfors
- Libraries: Helsinki Central Library Oodi, National Library of Finland, Helsinki University Library
- Museums: Ainola, Ateneum, Espoo Car Museum, Finnish Aviation Museum, Finnish Railway Museum, Gallen-Kallela Museum, Helsinki City Museum, Heureka, Home of Runeberg, Kiasma, Mannerheim Museum, National Museum of Finland, Taaborinvuori, WeeGee house
- Natural attractions: Nuuksio National Park, Karkali Strict Nature Reserve, Sipoonkorpi National Park, Porvoo Linnamäki
- Sport venues: Helsinki Olympic Stadium, Töölö Stadium
- Squares: Senate Square, Helsinki, Market Square, Helsinki
- Zoo: Korkeasaari

== Economy ==
The gross domestic product (GDP) of the region was €91.2 billion in 2018, accounting for 38.9% of Finnish economic output. GDP per capita adjusted for purchasing power was €43,500 or 144% of the EU27 average in the same year. The GDP per employee was 120% of the EU average. The employment rate is 76% as of 2022, second highest in Finland. There were 836,000 workplaces in Uusimaa in 2021, over 35% of the workplaces in Finland. The most common sectors were health and social services, wholesale and retail trade as well as professional, scientific and technical activities.

== Demographics ==
Languages in Uusimaa as of 2024
Languages	percent
Finnish	73.7%
Swedish	7.2%
Russian	2.9%
Estonian	1.9%
Arabic	1.5%
Somali	1.2%
English	1.2%
Other	10.4%

Historical population
Year	Pop.	±%
1950	667,459	—
1960	816,747	+22.4%
1970	1,005,257	+23.1%
1980	1,113,307	+10.7%
1990	1,232,236	+10.7%
2000	1,394,199	+13.1%
2010	1,532,309	+9.9%
2020	1,702,678	+11.1%
2026	1,806,849	+6.1%
Source: Doria, Statistics Finland

Uusimaa is a bilingual region, with municipalities both bilingual in Finnish and Swedish, and monolingual in Finnish. Uusimaa's coastal areas tend to be Swedish-speaking. The traditional regional dialects of Swedish (nyländska) are mostly spoken in Eastern Uusimaa, while in the rest of the Uusimaa Swedish dialect has become more standardised.

The Finnish-speaking population started to grow when the capital of the Grand Duchy of Finland was moved from Turku to Helsinki by the Emperor of Russia Alexander I in 1812, and the region attracted settlers from other parts of Finland. Helsinki slang first evolved in the late 19th century. 7.6% of the population of the region speaks the Swedish language natively.

Due to immigration, many foreign languages (Note: A language other than Finnish, Swedish or one of the Sami languages.) are spoken in Uusimaa. 19% speak a foreign language as their mother tongue, the highest proportion in Finland and 58% of all foreign-language speakers in Finland. The figure was 1.1% in 1990, 3.9% in 2000, 8.0% in 2010 and 14.7% in 2020. Meanwhile, the proportion of Finnish and Swedish speakers has decreased from 87.6% and 11.3% in 1990 to 75.9% and 7.5% in 2021 respectively. On a municipal level, the highest shares of foreign speakers are in Vantaa (28.7%), Espoo (25.0%), Helsinki (20.4%) and Kerava (17.3%). The lowest share is in Pukkila (3.7%).

The most spoken foreign languages are Russian (2.9%), Estonian (1.9%), Arabic (1.5%), Somali (1.2%) and English (1.2%). Other languages include Albanian, Chinese, Persian, Kurdish, Vietnamese, Spanish, Turkish, Thai, Tagalog, German, Nepali, Bengali, French, Romanian, Urdu, Hindi, Portuguese, Ukrainian, Italian, Polish, Tamil, Bulgarian, Hungarian, Swahili, Amharic, Serbo-Croatian, Latvian, Japanese, Dutch, Sinhalese, Tigrinya, Uzbek, Greek, Punjabi, Pashto and Telugu, all with over 1,000 speakers.

== Health ==
Map of the Uusimaa welfare region

In late March 2020, the region of Uusimaa went into lockdown to be isolated from the rest of Finland due to the global COVID-19 pandemic (2020/21).

== Regional council ==
The regional council is the main governing body for the region and focuses primarily on urban planning. Like all regional councils, it is mandated by law.

== Media ==
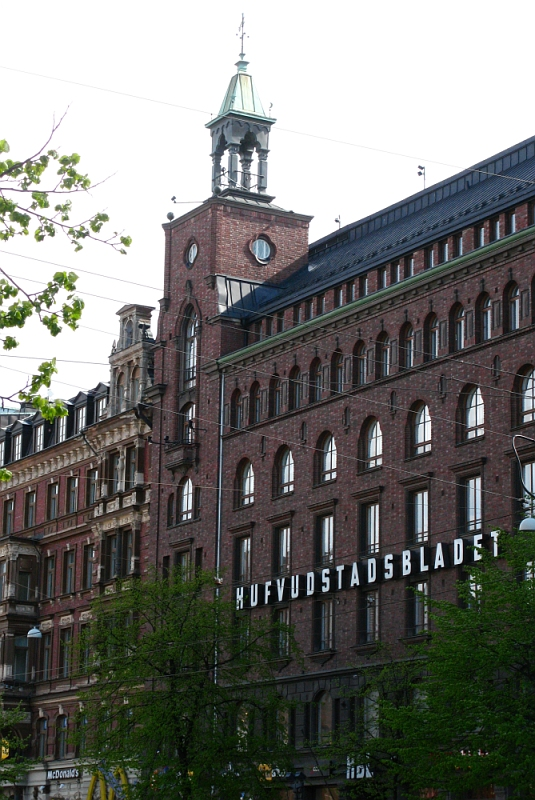
Hufvudstadsbladet's building, Mannerheimintie, Helsinki

=== Newspapers ===
The largest subscription newspapers published in the region are Helsingin Sanomat and Hufvudstadsbladet in Helsinki, Aamuposti in Hyvinkää, Länsi-Uusimaa in Lohja, Loviisan Sanomat and Östra Nyland in Loviisa, Uusimaa and Borgåbladet in Porvoo, Västra Nyland in Raseborg, and Keski-Uusimaa in Tuusula. Also two popular tabloid newspapers, Iltalehti and Ilta-Sanomat, are published there.

=== Radio stations ===
Yle's local radio stations in the western part of the region are the Finnish-language Ylen läntinen and Swedish-language Yle Vega Västnyland, in the Helsinki metropolitan area the Finnish-language Yle Radio Suomi Helsinki and Swedish-language Yle Vega Huvudstadsregionen, and in the eastern part the Finnish-language Yle Radio Itä-Uusimaa (discontinued) and Swedish-language Yle Vega Östnyland.

== Politics ==
For parliamentary elections, the Uusimaa region is divided into two electoral districts: The Helsinki constituency, which includes the city of Helsinki; and the Uusimaa constituency, which includes the region's other municipalities. These constituencies elect 23 and 37 members of the Parliament of Finland, respectively. The total number of MPs is 200.

== See also ==
- List of European regions by GDP
- Eastern Uusimaa – Former region of Finland
