= Pukkila =

- Municipality
- Pukkilan kunta Pukkila kommun
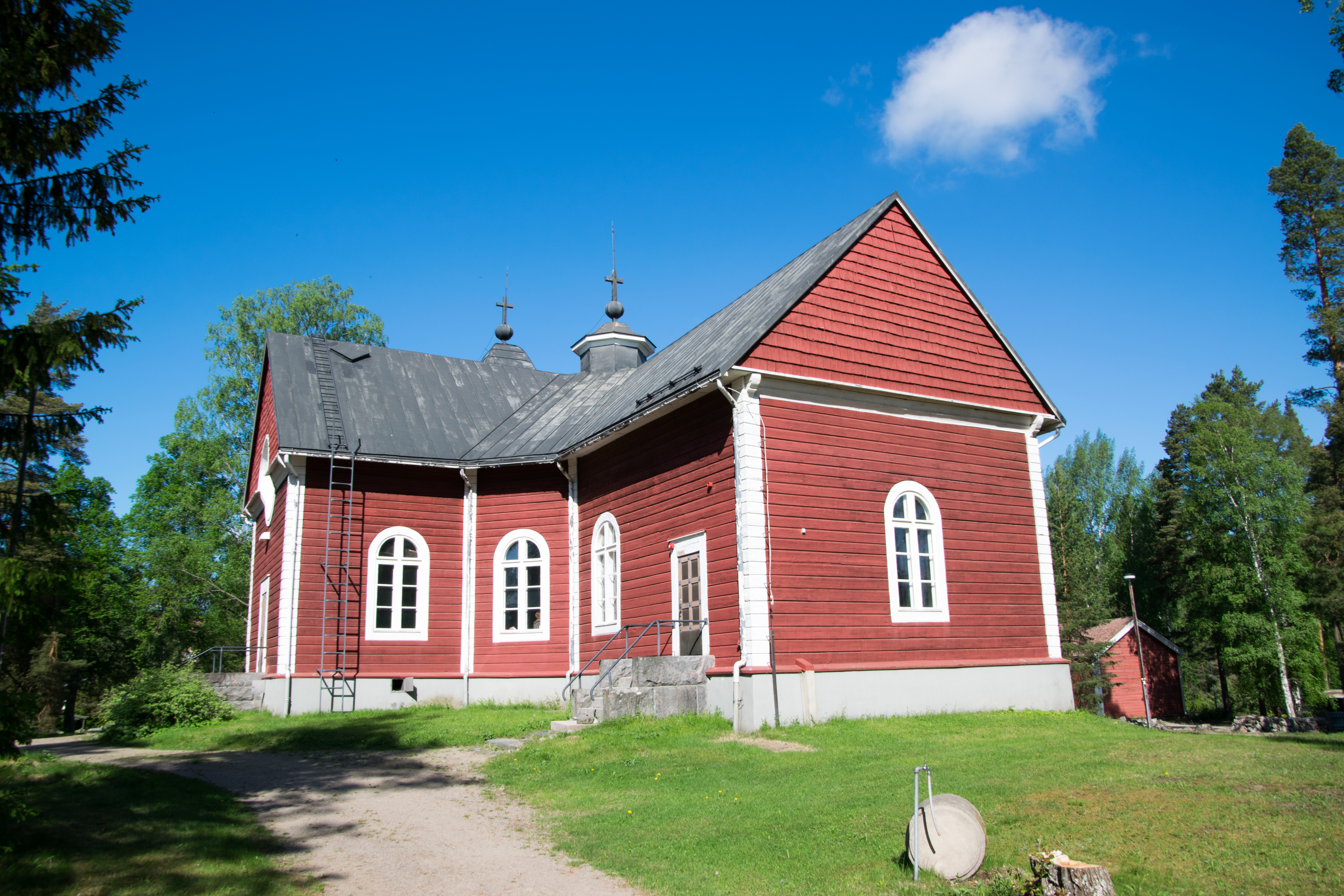
- Pukkila church

- Coat of arms

- Location of Pukkila in Finland
- Interactive map of Pukkila
- Coordinates: 60°38.7′N 025°35′E
- Country: Finland
- Region: Uusimaa
- Sub-region: Porvoo
- Charter: 1898

Government
  - Municipal manager: Juha Myyryläinen

Area (2018-01-01)
  - Total: 145.94 km^{2} (56.35 sq mi)
  - Land: 145.09 km^{2} (56.02 sq mi)
  - Water: 0.9 km^{2} (0.35 sq mi)
  - Rank: 279th largest in Finland

Population (2025-12-31)
  - Total: 1,720
  - Rank: 268th largest in Finland
  - Density: 11.85/km^{2} (30.7/sq mi)

Population by native language
  - Finnish: 94.8% (official)
  - Swedish: 0.6%
  - Others: 4.6%

Population by age
  - 0 to 14: 15.7%
  - 15 to 64: 60.6%
  - 65 or older: 23.7%
- Time zone: UTC+02:00 (EET)
  - Summer (DST): UTC+03:00 (EEST)
- Climate: Dfc
- Website: www.pukkila.fi/in-english/

Pukkila (Finnish: [ˈpukːilɑ]; Swedish: Pukkila, also Buckila) is a municipality of Finland. It is located in the Uusimaa region. The municipality has a population of 1,720 (31 December 2025) and covers an area of 145.94 square kilometres (56.35 sq mi) of which 0.9 km^{2} (0.35 sq mi) is water. The population density is 11.85 inhabitants per square kilometre (30.7/sq mi).

The municipality is unilingually Finnish. The pukki- part of the municipality's name means "male goat", which is why the name of the municipality literally means the "place of goat". Pukkila has previously also been called Savijoki ("Clay River") and, in local colloquial language, Vähä-Porvoo ("Lesser Porvoo").

In 1962, a former villager, Onni Nurmi, bequeathed the village 760 shares in a company called Nokia - then chiefly known as a manufacturer of rubber workboots - on condition that the income be used for the benefit of the elderly and that the shares would never be sold. After a legal battle the shares have now been diversified and the income used to fund a welfare centre and services for the elderly.

== Sights ==
Pukkila includes the Naarkoski rapids with small waterfalls and fishponds, the Pukkila Church, Pukkila's wild boar garden, and the old and new part of Yado Oikawa's Japanese inn.

== Politics ==
Results of the 2023 Finnish parliamentary election in Pukkila:

- True Finns 31.3%
- Centre Party 22.1%
- National Coalition Party 18.6%
- Social Democratic Party 12.3%
- Movement Now 4.2%
- Green League 3.6%
- Left Alliance 2.3%
- Christian Democrats 1.6%
- Freedom Alliance 1.3%
- Swedish People's Party 1.1%

== See also ==
- Myrskylä
- Orimattila
