= Viksjö =

Coordinates: 59°24′N 17°46′E

Viksjö (Swedish pronunciation: [ˈvɪ̂kːɧœ]) is a district of Järfälla Municipality, Stockholm County, Sweden, in Stockholm.

Viksjö has 15,000 inhabitants. The district was developed in the 1970s. The architecture consists mainly of detached terraced houses.

Viksjö is named after the old farm Viksjö Gård, which dates back to 1734. The name Viksjö is even older, occurring for the first time on an 11th-century rune-stone.

== Attractions ==
- The nature reserve Görväln by Lake Mälaren
- Görväln House
- Görväln Beach
- Viksjö Golf Course
- Bruket Alpine Skiing
- Viksjö Church
- Gåseborg

== Areas ==
- Högby
- Sandvik
- Andeboda
- Hummelmora

== Communication ==
- Commuter train to Jakobsberg and then feeder bus.
- Motorway (E18) from Stockholm.
- Approximate location: 59° 24' N, 17° 46' E

== Gallery ==
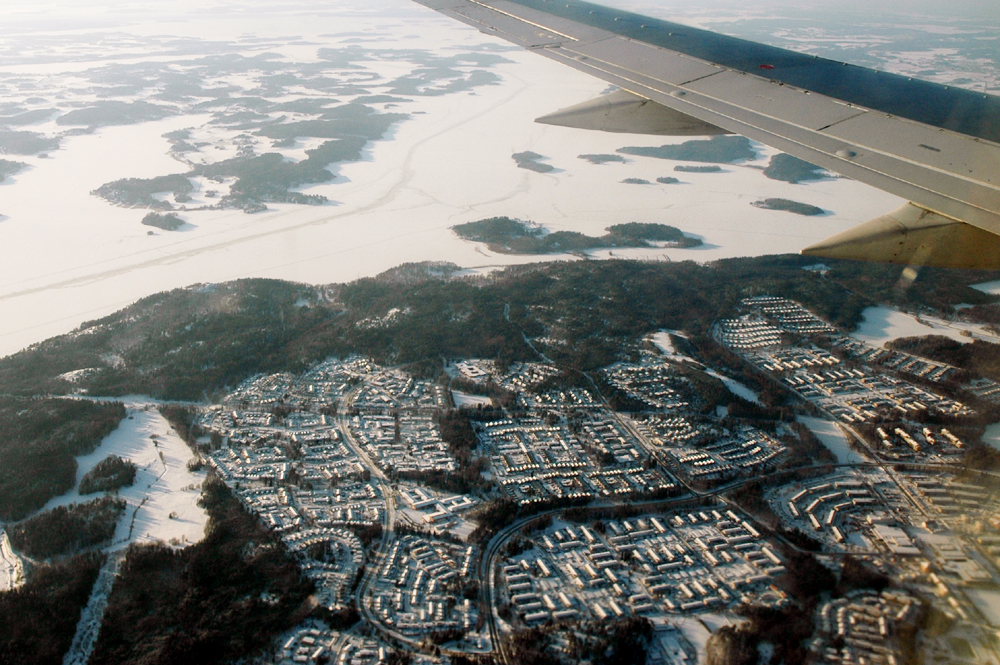
Viksjö from a plane

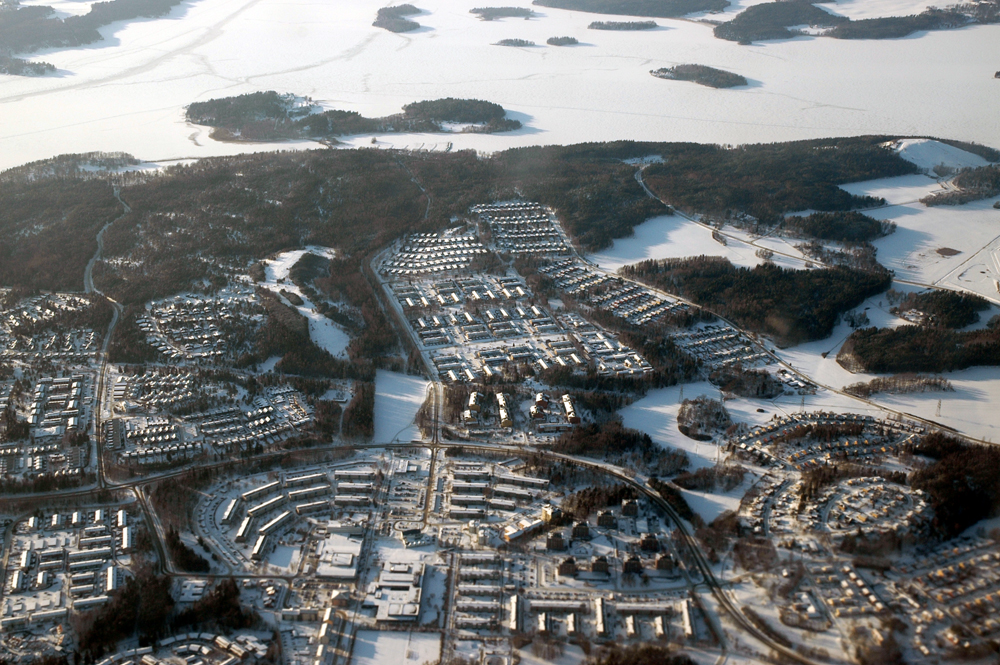
Helicopter view

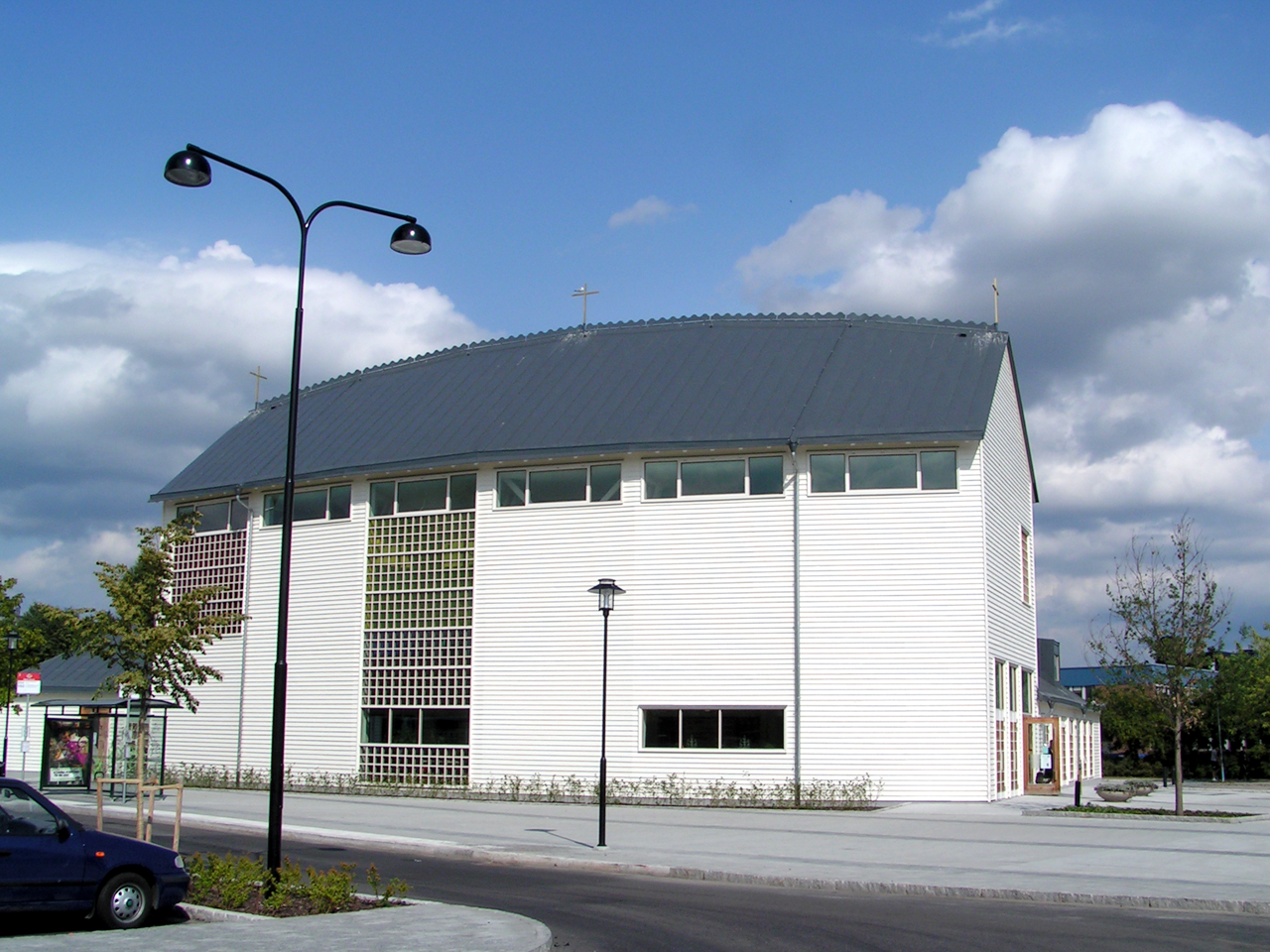
Viksjö Church

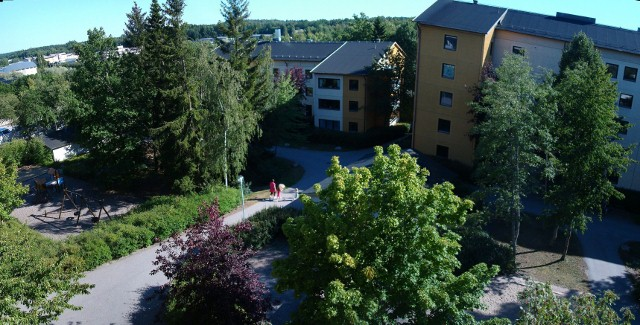
Viksjö suburbia neighbourhood and housing
