= Elfa =

Elfa or ELFA may refer to:

- Elfa AB, Swedish electronics supplier
- Elfa International, Swedish shelving company
- English Ladies Football Association (ELFA), 1921–1922
- Elfa Rún Kristinsdóttir (born 1985), Icelandic violinist
- Elfa Secioria (1959–2011), Indonesian composer and songwriter
- Elfa (production association) (bankrupt in 1993), major Lithuanian manufacturer of tape recorders and motors for various appliances
