= List of urban areas in Norway =

Statistics Norway, the governmental organisation with the task of measuring the Norwegian population, uses the term Norwegian: tettsted, lit. 'dense place'; (meaning urban settlement or urban area), which is defined as a continuous built-up area with a maximum distance of 50 metres (160 ft) between residences unless a greater distance is caused by public areas, cemeteries or similar reasons.

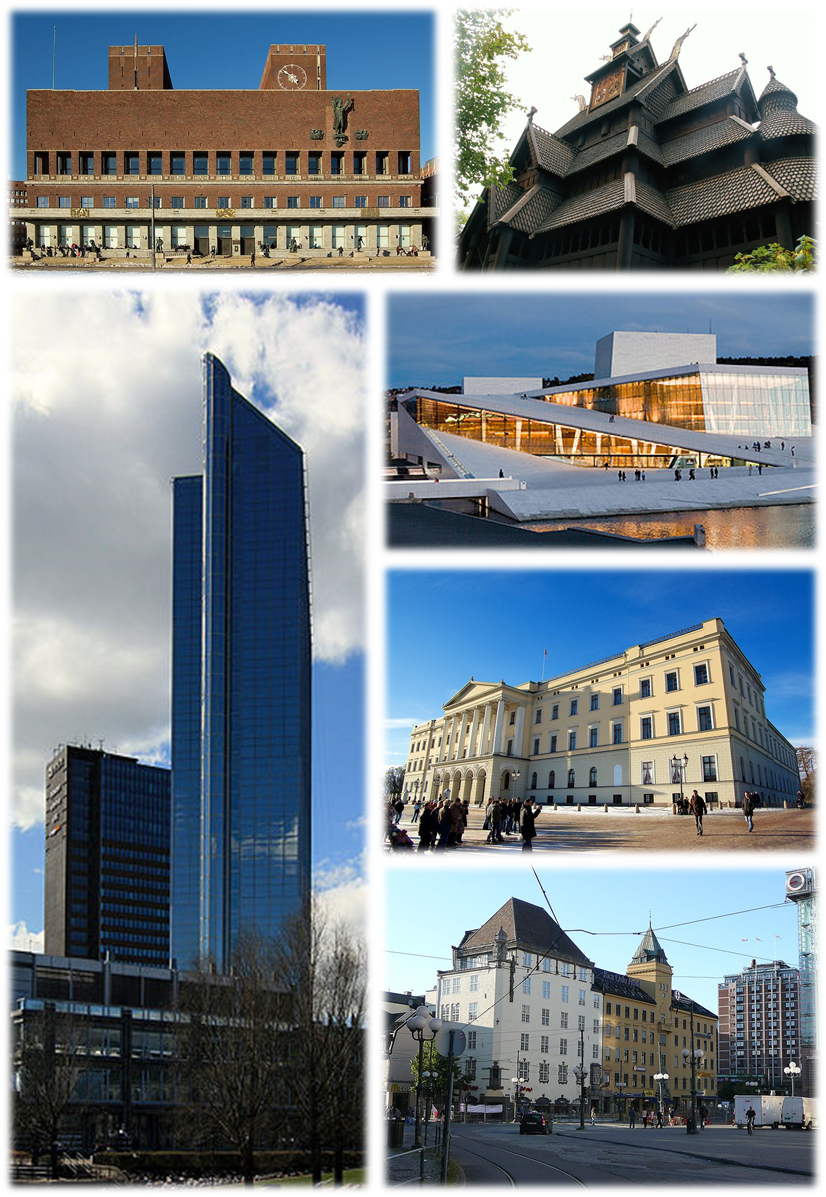
Oslo, the capital and largest city in Norway

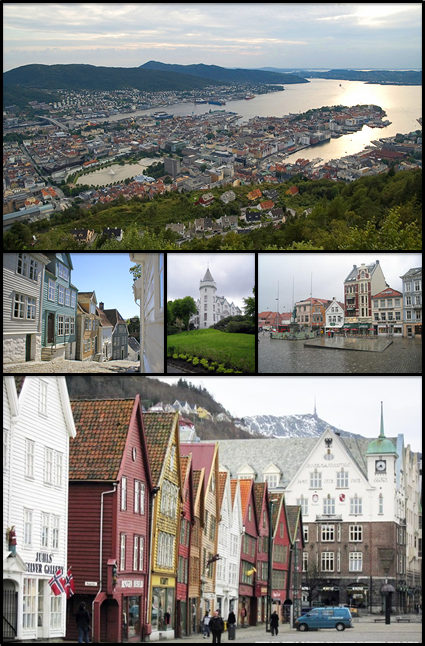
Bergen

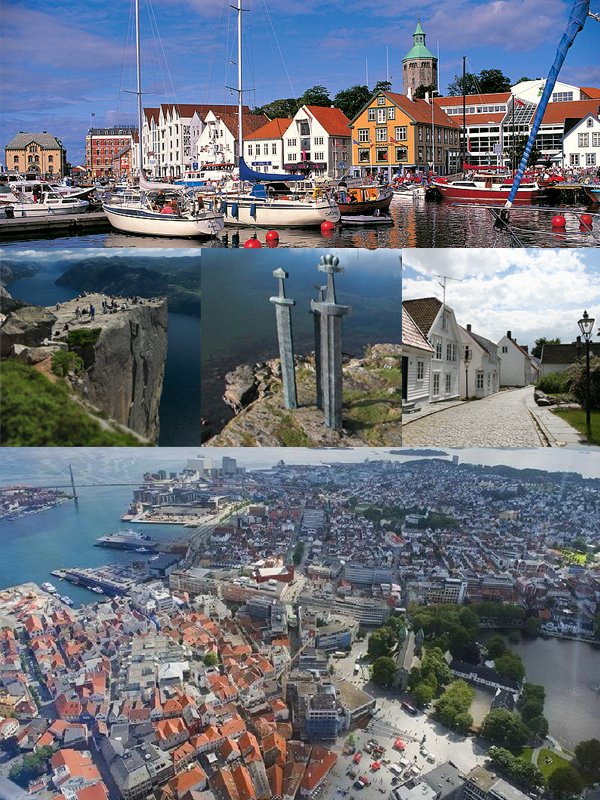
Stavanger

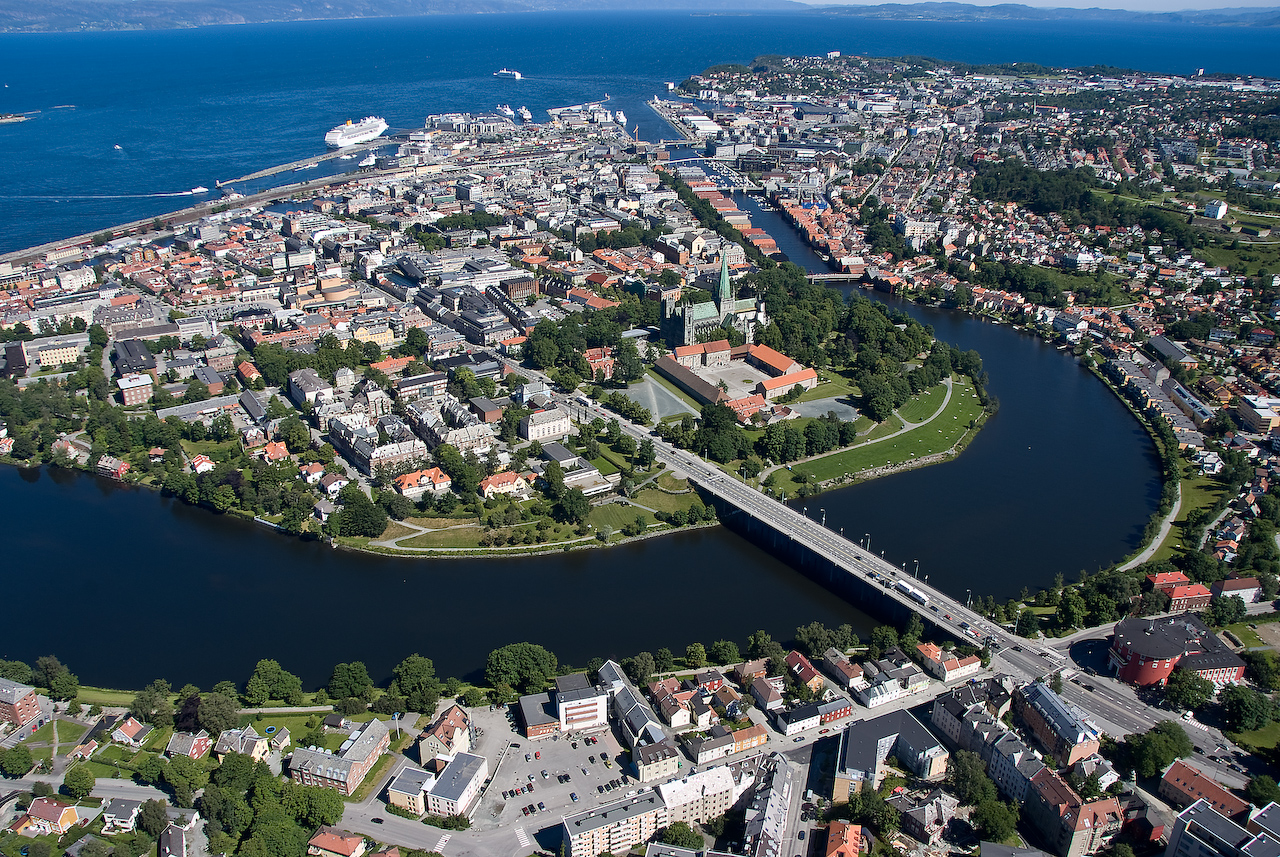
Trondheim

== Statistics ==
Rank	Urban area	Population	Municipality	County
1	Oslo	1,082,575	Oslo Municipality	Oslo/Akershus
2	Bergen	269,548	Bergen Municipality	Vestland
3	Stavanger/Sandnes /Sandnes	234,757	Stavanger Municipality; Sandnes Municipality	Rogaland
4	Trondheim	196,948	Trondheim Municipality	Trøndelag
5	Drammen	122,955	Drammen Municipality	Buskerud
6	Fredrikstad / Sarpsborg	120,332	Fredrikstad Municipality; Sarpsborg Municipality	Østfold
7	Skien / Porsgrunn	95,763	Skien Municipality; Porsgrunn Municipality	Telemark
8	Kristiansand	66,576	Kristiansand Municipality	Agder
9	Tønsberg	55,387	Tønsberg Municipality	Vestfold
10	Ålesund	55,386	Ålesund Municipality	Møre og Romsdal
11	Moss	49,428	Moss Municipality	Østfold
12	Sandefjord	46,453	Sandefjord Municipality	Vestfold
13	Haugesund	46,359	Haugesund Municipality	Rogaland
14	Arendal	44,856	Arendal Municipality	Agder
15	Bodø	42,831	Bodø Municipality	Nordland
16	Tromsø	41,915	Tromsø Municipality	Troms
17	Hamar	29,605	Hamar Municipality	Innlandet
18	Gjøvik	28,494	Gjøvik Municipality	Innlandet
19	Larvik	27,136	Larvik Municipality	Vestfold
20	Halden	26,126	Halden Municipality	Østfold
21	Askøy	24,280	Askøy Municipality	Vestland
22	Jessheim	23,918	Ullensaker Municipality	Akershus
23	Kongsberg	23,529	Kongsberg Municipality	Buskerud
24	Molde	21,854	Molde Municipality	Møre og Romsdal
25	Ski	21,434	Nordre Follo Municipality	Akershus
26	Harstad	21,289	Harstad Municipality	Troms
27	Lillehammer	21,263	Lillehammer Municipality	Innlandet
28	Horten	20,859	Horten Municipality	Vestfold
29	Korsvik	19,405	Kristiansand Municipality	Agder
30	Mo i Rana	18,755	Rana Municipality	Nordland
31	Tromsdalen	18,202	Tromsø Municipality	Troms
32	Kristiansund	18,103	Kristiansund Municipality	Møre og Romsdal
33	Hønefoss	16,844	Ringerike Municipality	Buskerud
34	Alta	15,931	Alta Municipality	Finnmark
35	Elverum	15,632	Elverum Municipality	Innlandet
36	Råholt	15,319	Eidsvoll Municipality	Akershus
37	Askim	15,089	Indre Østfold Municipality	Østfold
38	Osøyro	14,621	Bjørnafjorden Municipality	Vestland
39	Leirvik	14,507	Stord Municipality	Vestland
40	Grimstad	14,390	Grimstad Municipality	Agder
41	Narvik	14,051	Narvik Municipality	Nordland
42	Vennesla	13,803	Vennesla Municipality	Agder
43	Drøbak	13,628	Frogn Municipality	Akershus
44	Stjørdal	13,596	Stjørdal Municipality	Trøndelag
45	Nesoddtangen	13,363	Nesodden Municipality	Akershus
46	Bryne	13,151	Time Municipality	Rogaland
47	Steinkjer	12,929	Steinkjer Municipality	Trøndelag
48	Kongsvinger	12,338	Kongsvinger Municipality	Innlandet
49	Knarrevik/Straume	12,194	Øygarden Municipality	Vestland
50	Ålgård/Figgjo	11,876	Gjesdal Municipality; Sandnes Municipality	Rogaland
51	Kopervik	11,690	Karmøy Municipality	Rogaland
52	Egersund	11,629	Eigersund Municipality	Rogaland
53	Mandal	11,330	Lindesnes Municipality	Agder
54	Brumunddal	11,177	Ringsaker Municipality	Innlandet
55	Ås	10,962	Ås Municipality	Akershus
56	Søgne	10,925	Kristiansand Municipality	Agder
57	Levanger	10,610	Levanger Municipality	Trøndelag
58	Førde	10,535	Sunnfjord Municipality	Vestland
59	Mosjøen	9,902	Vefsn Municipality	Nordland
60	Arna	9,895	Bergen Municipality	Vestland
61	Kleppe/Verdalen	9,859	Klepp Municipality	Rogaland
62	Fetsund/Østersund	9,335	Lillestrøm Municipality	Akershus
63	Orkanger/Fannrem	9,085	Orkland Municipality	Trøndelag
64	Notodden	9,071	Notodden Municipality	Telemark
65	Florø	9,015	Kinn Municipality	Vestland
66	Kvaløysletta	8,868	Tromsø Municipality	Troms
67	Verdalsøra	8,601	Verdal Municipality	Trøndelag
68	Kløfta	8,371	Ullensaker Municipality	Akershus
69	Vestby	8,334	Vestby Municipality	Akershus
70	Namsos	8,280	Namsos Municipality	Trøndelag
71	Lillesand	8,266	Lillesand Municipality	Agder
72	Holmestrand	8,258	Holmestrand Municipality	Vestfold
73	Åkrehamn	7,955	Karmøy Municipality	Rogaland
74	Hammerfest	7,882	Hammerfest Municipality	Finnmark
75	Kvernaland	7,824	Klepp Municipality; Time Municipality	Rogaland
76	Rotnes	7,728	Nittedal Municipality	Akershus
77	Ørsta	7,568	Ørsta Municipality	Møre og Romsdal
78	Jørpeland/Nag	7,534	Strand Municipality	Rogaland
79	Nærbø	7,515	Hå Municipality	Rogaland
80	Malvik	7,394	Malvik Municipality	Trøndelag
81	Melhus	7,088	Melhus Municipality	Trøndelag
82	Volda	7,033	Volda Municipality	Møre og Romsdal
83	Mysen	7,026	Indre Østfold Municipality	Østfold
84	Vossevangen	6,965	Voss Municipality	Vestland
85	Bekkelaget	6,962	Stange Municipality	Innlandet
86	Åmot/Geithus	6,962	Modum Municipality	Buskerud
87	Hommersåk	6,729	Sandnes Municipality	Rogaland
88	Eidsvoll	6,672	Eidsvoll Municipality	Akershus
89	Knarvik	6,590	Alver Municipality	Vestland
90	Spydeberg	6,562	Indre Østfold Municipality	Østfold
91	Fauske	6,252	Fauske Municipality	Nordland
92	Sætre	6,227	Asker Municipality	Akershus
93	Flekkefjord	6,204	Flekkefjord Municipality	Agder
94	Ulsteinvik	6,164	Ulstein Municipality	Møre og Romsdal
95	Stavern	6,008	Larvik Municipality	Vestfold
96	Sandnessjøen	5,949	Alstahaug Municipality	Nordland
97	Sørumsand	5,878	Lillestrøm Municipality	Akershus
98	Hommelvik	5,824	Malvik Municipality	Trøndelag
99	Sortland	5,609	Sortland Municipality	Nordland
100	Lyngdal	5,558	Lyngdal Municipality	Agder

== See also ==
- Urban areas in the Nordic countries
- List of municipalities of Norway
- Metropolitan regions of Norway
- List of urban areas in Sweden by population
- List of urban areas in Denmark by population
- List of urban areas in the Nordic countries
- List of urban areas in Finland by population
- List of cities and towns in Iceland
- Largest metropolitan areas in the Nordic countries
- List of metropolitan areas in Sweden
