= Kallhäll =

Neighbourhood in Stockholm County, Sweden

Coordinates: 59°27′N 17°48′E

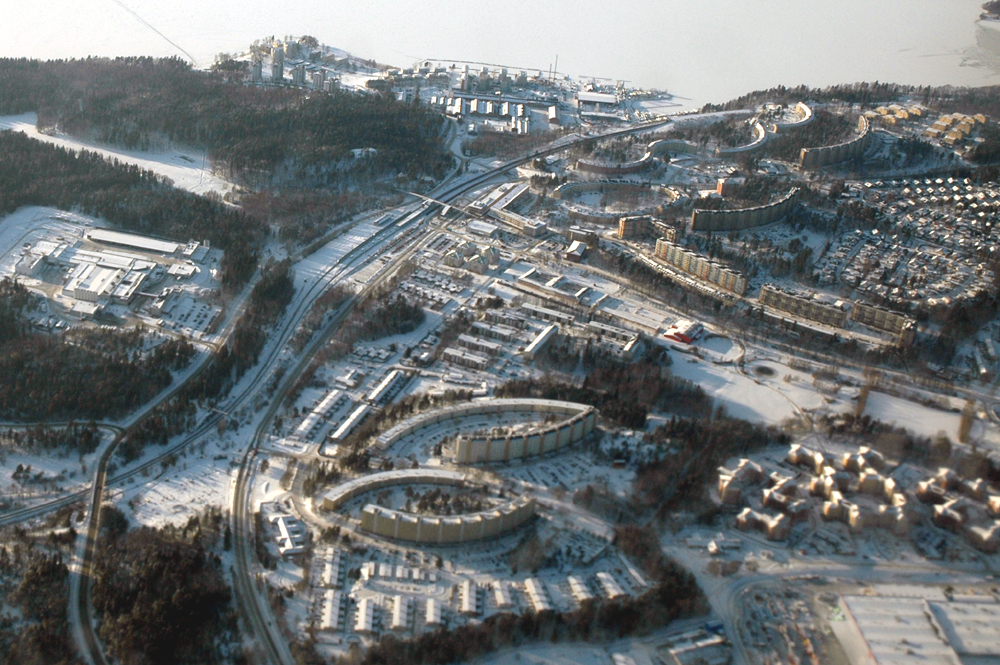
Aerial view of Kallhäll 2007

Kallhäll is a neighbourhood in Järfälla Municipality, Stockholm County. It is a suburban part of Stockholm urban area with a population of 12,000 inhabitants as of 2011 (including Stäket).

Kallhäll started as an industrial suburb when the industrialist Erik Bolinder decided to move his Bolinders Mechanical Shops to Kallhäll from Kungsholmen in central Stockholm. Housing for employees was built, thus expanding Kallhäll. The Bolinder factory structures remain today, encircled by expensive, modern lakeside residences.

A second era of expansion took place in the 1960s when Kallhäll was included in the Swedish government's great effort to reduce the lack of housing, Miljonprogrammet (The Million Programme). The tall, long, multiple-story buildings of the 1960s-70s dominate Kallhäll to this day.

Kallhäll has a station on the Stockholm commuter rail network, 21.1 km north-west of Stockholm Central Station.
