= List of urban areas in the Nordic countries =

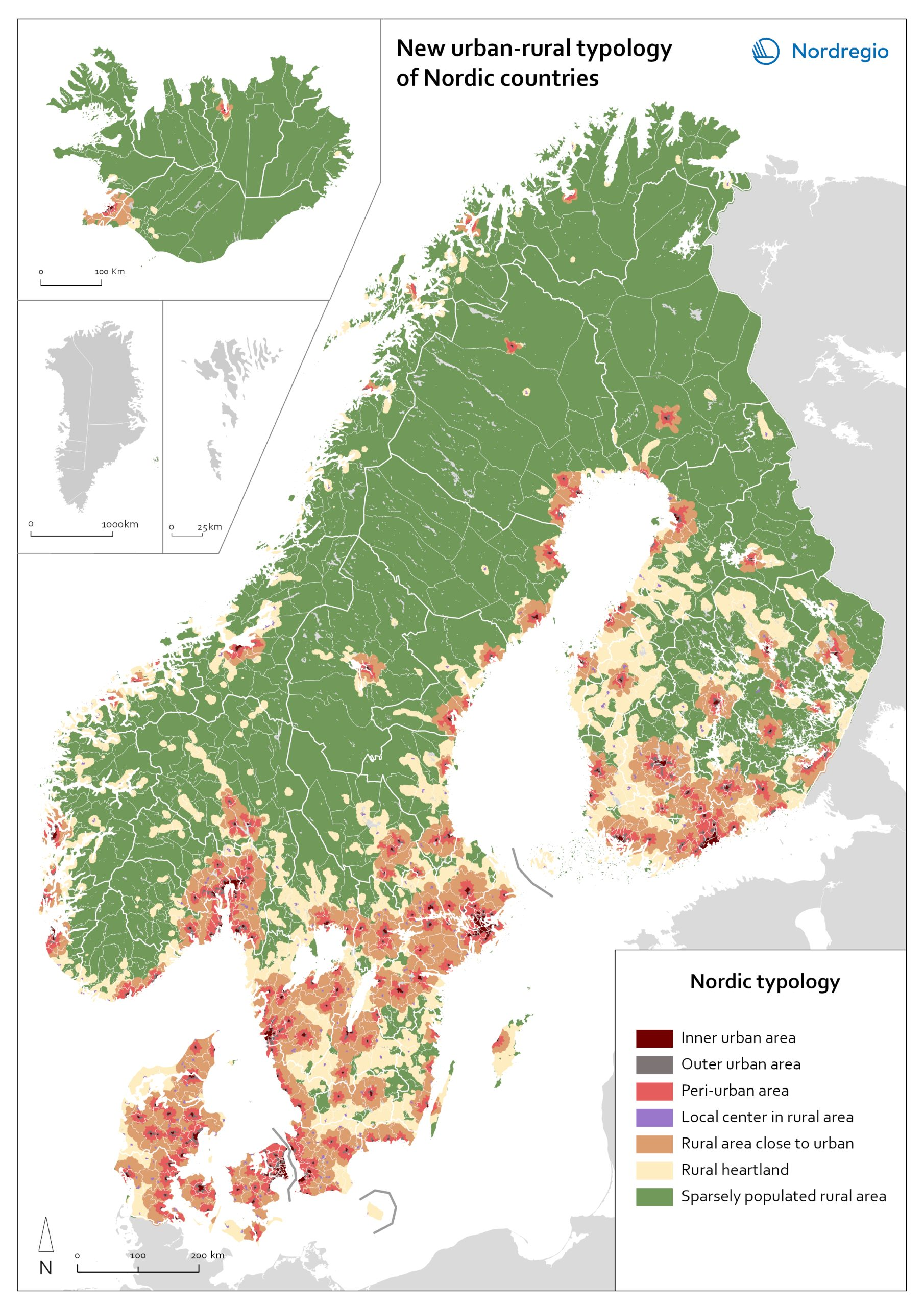
Population density in the Nordic countries

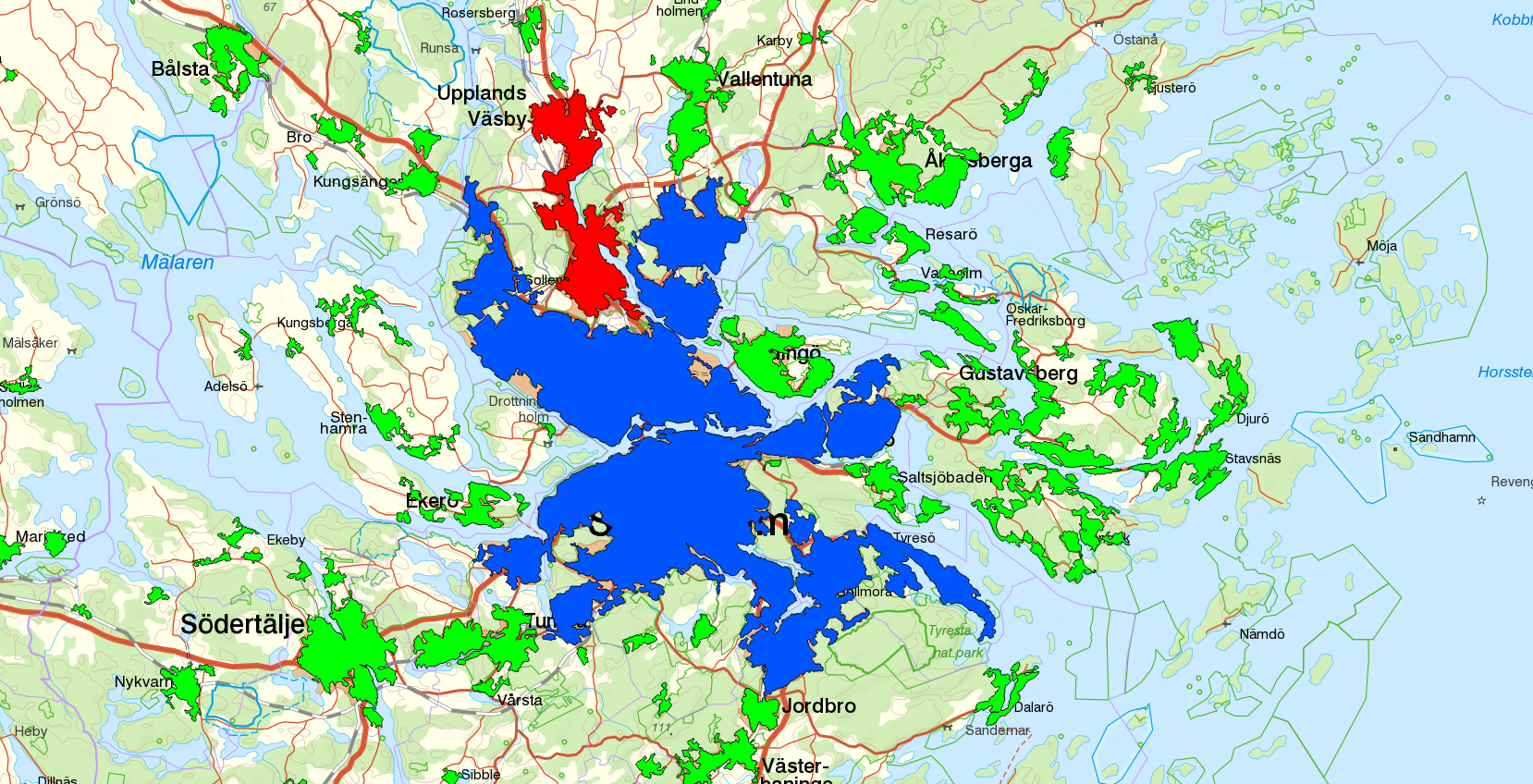
The Stockholm urban area (in blue), the largest urban area in the Nordic countries. The area includes land both inside and outside of the municipality of Stockholm.

This is a list of urban areas in the Nordic countries by population. Urban areas in the Nordic countries are measured at national level, independently by each country's statistical office. Statistics Sweden uses the term tätort (urban settlement), Statistics Finland also uses tätort in Swedish and taajama in Finnish, Statistics Denmark uses byområde (city), while Statistics Norway uses tettsted (urban settlement).

A common statistical definition between the Nordic countries was agreed in 1960, which defines an urban area as a contiguous built-up area with a population of at least 200 and where the maximum distance between dwellings is 200 metres, excluding roads, car parks, parks, sports grounds and cemeteries - regardless of the boundaries of the municipality, district or county. Despite the common definition, the different statistical offices have different approaches to carrying out these measurements, resulting in slight differences between countries. (Note: For example, Statistics Finland utilizes a 62,500 square metres (673,000 sq ft) grid system for analyzing population, resulting in slight measurement differences between it and the other Nordic statistical bureaus.)

The Nordic definition is unique to these countries and should not be confused with international concepts of metropolitan area or urban areas in general. In 2010, Finland (stat.fi) changed its definition. This means that, according to official statistics, the land area covered by urban areas is three times larger in Finland than in Norway, although the total urban population is about the same (ssb.no). It also means that the population of a Danish 'byområder' is usually less than half the population of the 'functional urban area' as defined by Eurostat, whereas the population of a Finnish 'taajama' is usually around 80% of the respective 'functional urban area' as defined by Eurostat. For example, in 2013 the 'functional urban area' of Aarhus had a population of 845,971, while the 'functional urban area' of Tampere had a population of 364,992. However, according to official statistics, the "taajama" of Tampere is larger than the "byområde" of Aarhus (eurostat.ec). This suggests that direct comparisons between Finland and the other Nordic countries may be problematic.

Rank	City or Urban settlement	Urban area population	Metropolitan or Eurostat FUA population	Country	Notes	Image
1	Stockholm	1,611,776	2,487,896	Sweden	Capital of Sweden. Stockholm Municipality: 1,000,374.	
2	Helsinki	1,396,899	1,738,375	Finland	Capital of Finland. Helsinki Municipality: 694,392.	
3	Copenhagen	1,366,301	2,135,634 (see notes)	Denmark	Capital of Denmark. Copenhagen Municipality: 660,842 (2023).	
4	Oslo	1,110,887	1,588,457; Eurostat: 1,278,827 (2013)	Norway	Capital of Norway. Oslo Municipality: 728,714. The Greater Oslo Region (metropolitan) area has a population of 1,546,706.	
5	Gothenburg	674,529	1,080,980	Sweden	Gothenburg Municipality: 600,559.	Gothenburg seen by night
6	Aarhus	367,095	845,971	Denmark	Aarhus Municipality: 367,095.	
7	Malmö	357,377	707,120; Eurostat: 658,050 (2017).	Sweden	Malmö Municipality: 328,494.	
8	Tampere	347,470	440,372; Eurostat: 369,525.	Finland	Tampere Municipality: 263,337. Most populous inland city in the Nordic countries.	
9	Turku	291,230	337,751	Finland	Turku Municipality: 209,633.	
10	Bergen	273,626	420,000; 395,338 (2013, Eurostat)	Norway	Bergen Municipality: 294,860. Metropolitan area: 377,116.	
11	Oulu	257,670	258,241	Finland	Oulu Municipality: 217,469	
12	Stavanger/Sandnes	241,644	365,347 (2025)	Norway	Stavanger Municipality: 151,669. Metropolitan area:* 365,347; Conurbation includes parts of the municipalities of Stavanger, Sandnes, Randaberg, and Sola.	
13	Reykjavík	239,733	249,054	Iceland	Capital of Iceland. Reykjavík Municipality: 138,772. Urban area includes all or most of the population of 5 additional municipalities in the Capital region.	
14	Trondheim	200,652	310,052 (2022); 264,396 (2013, Eurostat)	Norway	Trondheim Municipality: 218,460.	
15	Odense	178,210	485,672	Denmark	Odense Municipality: 213,558	
16	Uppsala	168,096	253,704<nr />288,203	Sweden	Uppsala Municipality: 225,164	
17	Aalborg	134,672	580,272	Denmark	Aalborg Municipality: 205,809; Includes Nørresundby.	|
18	Jyväskylä	143,420	212,500	Finland	Jyväskylä Municipality: 149,895	|
19	Drammen	125,680		Norway	Drammen Municipality: 106,013; Includes parts of the municipalities of Øvre Eiker, Lier, and Asker.	|
20	Fredrikstad/Sarpsborg	122,704		Norway	Fredrikstad: 83,220; Sarpsborg: 57,483	|
21	Lahti	119,068	191,460	Finland	Lahti Municipality: 121,832	
22	Västerås	110,877	173,322; 195,675	Sweden	Västerås Municipality: 137,207	
23	Örebro	107,038	208,241	Sweden	Örebro Municipality: 135,460	
24	Linköping	104,232	177,308	Sweden	Linköping Municipality: 146,416	
25	Helsingborg	97,122	272,873	Sweden	Helsingborg Municipality: 129,177	
26	Porsgrunn/Skien	97,043		Norway	Includes parts of the municipalities of Porsgrunn, Skien, and Bamble.	
27	Jönköping	112,766		Sweden	Jönköping Municipality: 127,382	
28	Kuopio	88,520	167,753	Finland	Kuopio Municipality: 126,572	
29	Norrköping	87,247	183,100	Sweden	Norrköping Municipality: 130,050	
30	Pori	84,190		Finland	Pori Municipality: 83,010	
31	Lund	82,800		Sweden	Lund Municipality: 110,488; Included in Stormalmö (Malmö Metropolitan Area).	
32	Umeå	79,594		Sweden	Umeå Municipality: 115,473	
33	Esbjerg	72,398		Denmark	Esbjerg Municipality: 116,032	
34	Gävle	71,033	184,346	Sweden	Gävle Municipality: 95,055; Metropolitan area together with Sandviken	
35	Kristiansand	67,920		Norway	Kristiansand Municipality: 119,287	
36	Joensuu	67,811		Finland	Joensuu Municipality: 79,129	
37	Vaasa	67,690		Finland	Vaasa Municipality: 71,209	
38	Borås	66,273		Sweden	Borås Municipality: 103,294	
39	Eskilstuna	64,679	209,028	Sweden	Eskilstuna Municipality: 96,311	
40	Södertälje	64,619		Sweden	Södertälje Municipality: 86,246; No independent area, part of Greater Stockholm	
41	Randers	62,687		Denmark	Randers Municipality: 98,265	
42	Karlstad	61,685	179,486	Sweden	Karlstad Municipality: 85,753	
43	Växjö	60,887	156,629	Sweden	Växjö Municipality: 83,005	
44	Täby	61,272		Sweden	Täby Municipality: 63,789; No independent area, part of Greater Stockholm	
45	Kolding	60,508		Denmark	Kolding Municipality: 92,515	
46	Halmstad	58,577	134,156	Sweden	Halmstad Municipality: 91,800	
47	Vejle	56,567		Denmark	Vejle Municipality: 114,140	
48	Horsens	55,884		Denmark	Horsens Municipality: 85,662	
49	Lappeenranta	55,743		Finland	Lappeenranta Municipality: 73,241	
50	Rovaniemi	52,753		Finland	Rovaniemi Municipality: 66,191	
51	Kotka	51,704		Finland	Kotka Municipality: 50,029	
52	Sundsvall	50,712	125,812	Sweden	Sundsvall Municipality: 96,977	

The population numbers from the countries are from different years, as Statistics Finland, Statistics Norway, and Statistics Denmark release the statistic yearly (albeit at different times of the year), but Statistics Sweden only releases the figures every five years. The Danish data is from 2014, the Swedish is from 2010 and the Finnish is from 2017.

== See also ==
- Urban areas in the Nordic countries
- List of the most populated municipalities in the Nordic countries
- List of metropolitan areas in Sweden
- List of urban areas in Sweden by population
- List of urban areas in Denmark by population
- List of urban areas in Norway by population
- List of urban areas in Finland by population
- List of cities in Iceland
- List of cities in the Baltic states
- List of metropolitan areas by population
