= Urban areas in Denmark =

The population is measured by Statistics Denmark for urban areas (Danish: byområder or bymæssige områder), which is defined as a contiguous built-up area with a maximum distance of 200 m between houses, unless further distance is caused by public areas, cemeteries or similar reasons. Furthermore, to obtain by-status, the area must have at least 200 inhabitants. Some urban areas in Denmark have witnessed conurbation and grown together.

Numbers correspond to the urban area's ranking in the list. Note that due to their close proximity, Aalborg (4) may cover up Nørresundby (27).

Urban areas in Denmark with a population of more than 20,000 inhabitants as of 1 January 2026
#	Diff.	Urban area	Population
1	Steady	Copenhagen (København)	1,408,439
2	Steady	Aarhus	305,175
3	Steady	Odense	187,522
4	Steady	Aalborg	122,285
5	Steady	Esbjerg	71,297
6	▲1	Horsens	64,893
7	▼1	Randers	64,674
8	Steady	Kolding	62,670
9	Steady	Vejle	62,085
10	Steady	Roskilde	53,897
11	Steady	Silkeborg	52,820
12	Steady	Herning	52,079
13	Steady	Hørsholm	48,797
14	Steady	Helsingør (Elsinore)	48,395
15	Steady	Næstved	45,510
16	Steady	Viborg	42,988
17	Steady	Fredericia	41,743
18	Steady	Køge	38,840
19	Steady	Taastrup	38,328
20	Steady	Holstebro	37,306
21	Steady	Hillerød	36,836
22	Steady	Slagelse	35,943
23	Steady	Holbæk	31,112
24	Steady	Sønderborg	28,508
25	Steady	Svendborg	27,501
26	Steady	Hjørring	25,748
27	Steady	Nørresundby	24,831
28	▲1	Ølstykke-Stenløse	23,904
29	▼1	Ringsted	23,866
30	Steady	Frederikshavn	22,482
31	Steady	Haderslev	22,284
32	Steady	Smørumnedre	21,887
33	Steady	Birkerød	21,242
34	Steady	Farum	20,558
35	Steady	Skanderborg	20,310
36	Steady	Skive	20,092

== See also ==
- Largest metropolitan areas in the Nordic countries
- List of metropolitan areas in Sweden
- List of urban areas in Sweden by population
- List of urban areas in Norway by population
- List of urban areas in the Nordic countries
- List of urban areas in Finland by population
- List of cities in Iceland
- World's largest cities
- List of cities in Denmark by population
