= List of the most populous municipalities in the Nordic countries =

This is a list of the most populous municipalities in the Nordic countries, with only municipalities of at least 100,000 inhabitants. Of the five Nordic countries (Denmark, Finland, Iceland, Norway, and Sweden), every country has at least one city above 100,000 inhabitants.

== List ==
| Municipality | Country | Population | Area (km^{2}) | Density (/km^{2}) |
|---|---|---|---|---|
| Stockholm | Sweden | 999,713 | 187.16 | 5,291 |
| Oslo | Norway | 729,799 | 426.4 | 1,680 |
| Helsinki | Finland | 696,371 | 214.42 | 3,148 |
| Copenhagen | Denmark | 653,664 | 86.4 | 7,566 |
| Gothenburg | Sweden | 604,325 | 447.76 | 1,350 |
| Malmö | Sweden | 361,974 | 156.87 | 2,307 |
| Espoo | Finland | 325,716 | 312.35 | 1,006 |
| Aarhus | Denmark | 301,049 | 467.70 | 773 |
| Bergen | Norway | 295,426 | 445.14 | 654 |
| Tampere | Finland | 263,337 | 524.89 | 486 |
| Vantaa | Finland | 252,956 | 238.38 | 1,038 |
| Uppsala | Sweden | 245,663 | 2,182.80 | 113 |
| Aalborg | Denmark | 222,571 | 1,137.30 | 196 |
| Trondheim | Norway | 219,152 | 323.01 | 663 |
| Oulu | Finland | 217,469 | 2,972.44 | 72 |
| Odense | Denmark | 207,762 | 305.60 | 680 |
| Turku | Finland | 209,633 | 245.63 | 822 |
| Linköping | Sweden | 167,578 | 1,427.44 | 117 |
| Västerås | Sweden | 159,663 | 957.89 | 167 |
| Örebro | Sweden | 159,437 | 1,373.15 | 116 |
| Stavanger | Norway | 151,757 | 68.01 | 2,186 |
| Helsingborg | Sweden | 151,403 | 344.01 | 440 |
| Jyväskylä | Finland | 149,895 | 1,171.03 | 126 |
| Jönköping | Sweden | 146,330 | 1,480.36 | 99 |
| Norrköping | Sweden | 145,222 | 1,495.05 | 97 |
| Reykjavík | Iceland | 142,740 | 274.00 | 521 |
| Umeå | Sweden | 133,112 | 2,316.61 | 57 |
| Bærum | Norway | 130,772 | 189.28 | 691 |
| Lund | Sweden | 130,506 | 427.23 | 305 |
| Kuopio | Finland | 126,572 | 3,241.74 | 38 |
| Vejle | Denmark | 120,949 | 1,062.00 | 114 |
| Lahti | Finland | 121,832 | 459.5 | 263 |
| Kristiansand | Norway | 116,735 | 428.21 | 273 |
| Esbjerg | Denmark | 115,758 | 794.50 | 146 |
| Borås | Sweden | 114,747 | 909.901 | 126 |
| Huddinge | Sweden | 114,118 | 131.01 | 871 |
| Nacka | Sweden | 110,529 | 95.12 | 1162 |
| Eskilstuna | Sweden | 107,713 | 1,250.49 | 86 |
| Halmstad | Sweden | 105,838 | 1014.13 | 104 |
| Frederiksberg | Denmark | 104,664 | 8.70 | 12,030 |
| Drammen | Norway | 104,109 | 135 | 771 |
| Gävle | Sweden | 103,581 | 1,613.37 | 64 |
| Södertälje | Sweden | 102,525 | 525.15 | 195 |

== See also ==
- List of urban areas in the Nordic countries
- List of metropolitan areas in Sweden
