= Bele Barkarby FF =

Swedish football club

- Full name: Bele Barkarby Fotbollförening
- Founded: 2002
- Ground: Veddestavallen; Järfälla Municipality; Sweden
- Chairman: Philippe Jolly
- Head coach: Putte Ramberg
- Coach: Fredrik Råssmo-Perlebrant
- League: Division 3 Norra Svealand
- 2010: Division 4 Stockholm Norra, 1st (Promoted)
Home colours	Away colours

Bele Barkarby FF is a Swedish football club located in Järfälla Municipality in Stockholm County.

== Background ==
Bele Barkarby Idrottsförening is a sports club based in Järfälla that provides for the sports of football, floorball, ice hockey and gymnastics. The club was formed on 1 January 2002 following the amalgamation of IK Bele and Barkarby SK. The football section is known as Bele Barkarby Fotbollförening.

Since their foundation Bele Barkarby FF has participated mainly in the lower divisions of the Swedish football league system. The club currently plays in Division 3 Norra Svealand which is the fifth tier of Swedish football. They play their home matches at the Veddestavallen in Järfälla Municipality.

Bele Barkarby FF are affiliated to Stockholms Fotbollförbund.

== Recent history ==
In recent seasons Bele Barkarby FF have competed in the following divisions:

2011 – Division 3 Norra Svealand
2010 – Division 4 Stockholm Norra
2009 – Division 4 Stockholm Norra
2008 – Division 5 Stockholm Norra
2007 – Division 5 Stockholm Norra
2006 – Division 4 Stockholm Norra
2005 – Division 4 Stockholm Norra
2004 – Division 5 Stockholm Norra
2003 – Division 5 Stockholm Norra
2002 – Division 4 Stockholm Norra

== Attendances ==
In recent seasons Bele Barkarby FF have had the following average attendances:

Season	Average attendance	Division / Section	Level
2009	Not available	Div 4 Stockholm Norra	Tier 6
2010		Div 4 Stockholm Norra	Tier 6

* Attendances are provided in the Publikliga sections of the Svenska Fotbollförbundet website.
