= IK Partners =

European private equity firm

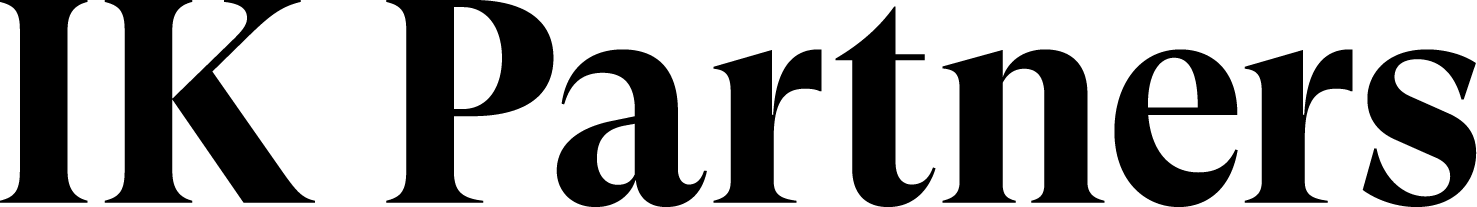
- Company type: Private Ownership, Limited Liability Partnership
- Industry: Private Equity
- Predecessor: IK Investment Partners
- Founded: 1989; 37 years ago
- Headquarters: London, United Kingdom
- Key people: (CEO) Christopher Masek
- Products: Investments, private equity funds
- Total assets: €19 billion
- Owner: Wendel (2024–present)
- Number of employees: +200 (2024)
- Website: ikpartners.com

IK Partners (IK) is a European private equity firm investing in small- and mid-cap companies across northern and western Europe.

== History ==
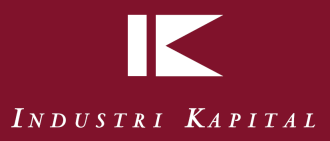
Logo used by the firm prior to its rebranding as IK Investment Partners

IK Partners was established in 1989. Founded under the name Industri Kapital by Björn Savén and Kim Wahl, the partnership's origins lie in Enskilda Ventures, which in 1989 sponsored Björn Savén in raising the Scandinavian Acquisition Capital Fund (SAC) and established the London office. SAC closed with approximately €108 million in commitments, mainly from Scandinavian investors.

In 1993 Industri Kapital became independent through the management buyout of SAC's assets and activities from Skandinaviska Enskilda Banken, the parent of Enskilda Ventures. SAC's was renamed the Industri Kapital 1989 fund. In the same year, the company established offices in Stockholm and Oslo.

After having its name changed to IK Investment Partners in June 2008, it became known as IK Partners in September 2021. In December 2023, it disposed of CDMO Klingel Holding to Swedish medical devices developer and manufacturer Elos Medtech for a sum of €370m.

In May 2024, Wendel announced that it had completed the acquisition of a 51% stake in the company for approximately €3.8 billion.

=== Funds ===
Industri Kapital's second fund, IK 1994, held its final closing with commitments totalling €250 million.

In 1997 Industri Kapital inaugurated its Hamburg office and closed its third fund, IK 1997, with commitments of €750 million. The year after, the firm completed its first investment in Germany.

The fourth fund, IK 2000, closed with €2.1 billion in commitments in the year 2000. IK 2000 made its first investment in France. Three years later, in 2003, Industri Kapital began raising its fifth fund, IK 2004. IK completed fundraising in 2004 with €825 million in commitments. The firm's Paris office was opened two years later.

In the year 2007 Industri Kapital closed its sixth fund, IK 2007, with commitments of €1.7 billion. In October 2013, IK closed its seventh fund, IK VII, with investor commitments of approximately €1.4 billion.

In 2015, IK closed its first small cap fund, IK Small Cap I, at its hard cap of €277 million. The following year, IK closed its 8th mid-cap fund, the IK VIII Fund, at its hard cap of €1.85 billion. In 2017, the firm opened its Amsterdam office.

IK continued to grow its small cap team through the IK Small Cap II Fund, which closed in February 2018 with total commitments of €550 million (almost twice the size of its predecessor).

In 2019, IK introduced its minority partnership investment strategy and closed its first fund, IK Partnership I, with commitments of €300 million.

The firm's ninth mid-cap fund, IK IX, was closed in May 2020, at its hard cap of €2.85 billion.

IK closed its IK Small Cap III in April 2021, after raising and reaching its €1.2 billion hard cap in three months (more than twice the size of its predecessor). The fund included a dedicated pool to fund smaller transactions as part of the firm's Development Capital strategy.

In 2021, the firm closed IK Partnership II with commitments of €335 million.

In 2024, IK introduced its first continuation vehicle, IK Strategic Opportunities I, which closed with commitments of €505 million.

IK closed its most recent Mid Cap fund, IK X, in April 2025, at its hard cap of €3.3 billion, the largest fund to date.

== Acquisitions ==
In March 2023, IK Partners acquired UK-based Ipsum Group, specialist infrastructure service provider, from Aliter for an undisclosed amount. In April, it acquired teleradiology provider Medica Group for a sum of £269m.

In June 2023, the firm acquired Dutch snack food producer GoodLife Foods for an un-disclosed amount. In July, IK Partners, together with Summit Partners, acquired a majority stake in the Swiss independent wealth management service provider Cinerius Financial Partners for an undisclosed amount.

== See also ==
- Elfa AB, founded 1945 in Sweden, acquired in 2006
