= The Container Store =

American retailer (1978–2026)

The Container Store Group, Inc.

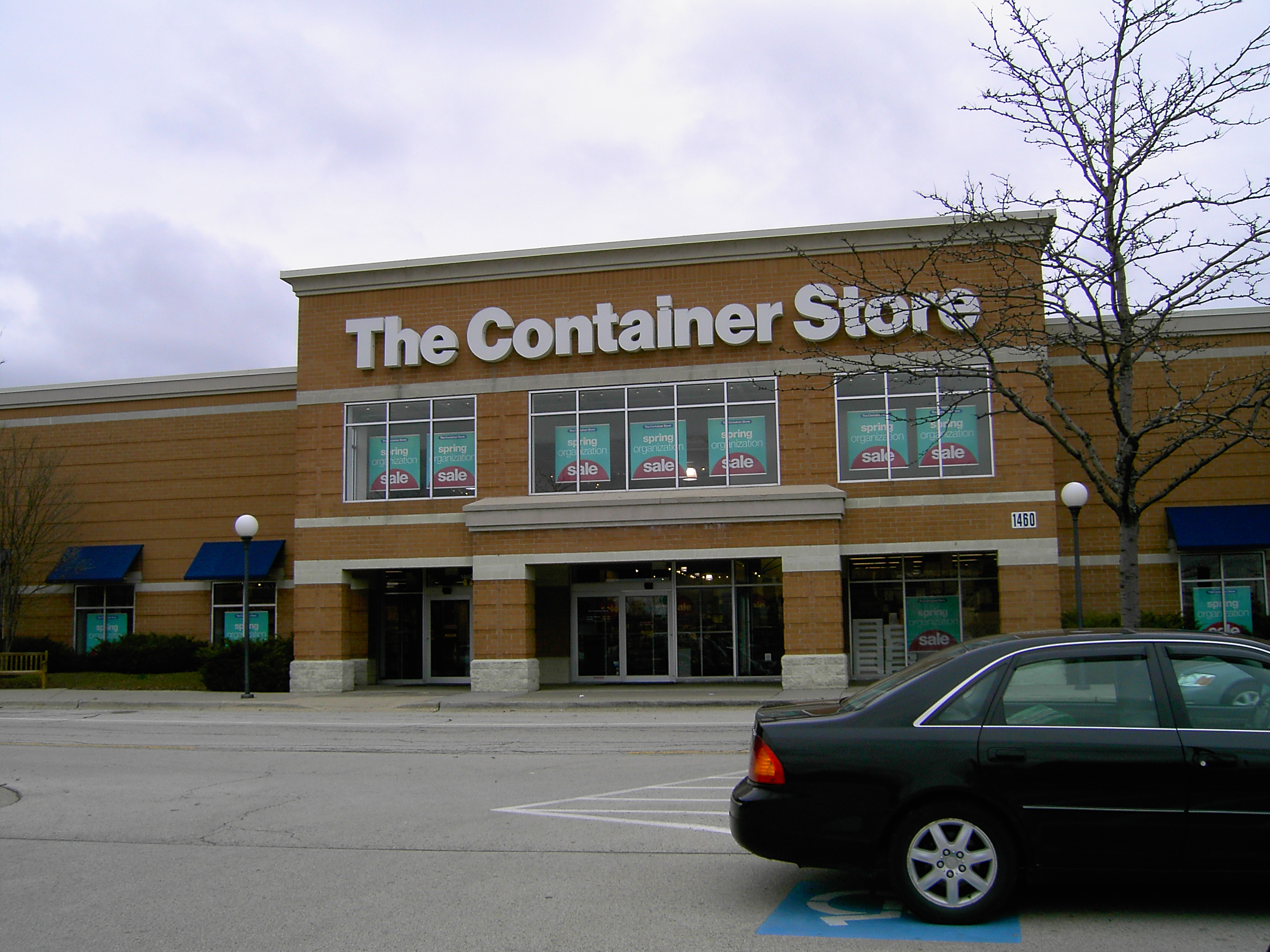
- The Container Store in Schaumburg, Illinois
- Type: Private
- Industry: Retail
- Founded: July 1978; 48 years ago in Dallas, Texas, U.S.
- Founders: John W. Mullen III; Garrett Boone; Kip Tindell
- Defunct: July 1, 2026; 4 months ago (original company)
- Fate: Acquired by Bed Bath & Beyond, Inc.
- Successor: The Container Store / Bed Bath & Beyond
- Headquarters: Coppell, Texas, U.S.
- Number of locations: 102 (2024)
- Key people: Joel Bines (Head of the Office of the Chief Executive Officer)
- Revenue: ▼US$848 million (2023)
- Operating income: ▲US$−105 million (2023)
- Net income: ▲US$−103 million (2023)
- Total assets: ▼US$936 million (2023)
- Total equity: ▼US$160 million (2023)
- Owner: Bed Bath & Beyond, Inc.
- Number of employees: 4,300 (2024)
- Website: containerstore.com

The Container Store Group, Inc. was an American specialty retail chain which offered storage and organization products and custom closets. The company was acquired by Bed Bath & Beyond, Inc. for $150 million in July 2026, with plans to rebrand its 98 locations to incorporate the Bed Bath & Beyond name.

== History ==
The Container Store was founded in Dallas by Garrett Boone and John Mullen. With the backing of their families, they inaugurated the first The Container Store on July 1, 1978. The store introduced a new retailing category: home storage and organization. Kip Tindell and his wife joined the founding team the next year.

In 1982, the company switched to a computerized management system, which almost drove the company into the ground. The Houston store opening in 1988 marked the start of the company's booming sales. It opened its first location outside of Texas in 1991 in Atlanta, its first New York area store in 2000, and its first Los Angeles area store in 2006. In 1999, The Container Store bought one of its main suppliers, Elfa International, a Swedish company that specialized in shelving and storage units.

The founders hired by the dozen but realized they also needed a strong company culture to maintain the spirit and attractiveness of their stores. The company started giving 235 hours of training time to its new salespeople, ten times the industry average. By the early 2000s, The Container Store had become a regular recipient of the Best Company to Work for in America award delivered by Fortune.

In July 2007, The Container Store sold a majority stake of the company to the private equity firm based in Los Angeles Leonard Green & Partners. After the deal, The Container Store announced plans to open 29 more stores in the next five years. In 2013, the retailer was one of the hottest IPOs of 2013. However, according to Forbes, "the Container Store is a far cry from the 300 store potential investors were promised in the IPO." Since 2013, only 30 stores were added, or about 5 per year. The Container Store has not kept its promise to investors "to be the category killer of storage containers and home organization."

In 2016, Kip Tindell stepped down as CEO and was replaced by Melissa Reiff. In 2021, Satish Malhotra replaced Melissa Reiff as CEO and president of the company. In the same year, the company reached the billion-dollar mark in revenue for the first time in its history and acquired Closet Works for $21.5 million. In 2024, Beyond Inc. (formerly Overstock Inc., owner of Bed Bath & Beyond since 2023) invested $40 million in The Container Store in a deal where Bed Bath & Beyond showcase spaces were to be integrated in The Container Store, marking Bed Bath & Beyond's return to physical stores.

On December 23, 2024, The Container Store filed for Chapter 11 bankruptcy, expecting to complete reorganization and emerge as a private company by January 26, 2025, without closing any stores in the process. On January 24, 2025, The Container Store received court approval for its restructuring plan, which reduced its debt by approximately $88 million and was expected to take the company private under the ownership of its lenders. The company emerged from Chapter 11 on January 28, 2025 as a privately held company, having also secured $40 million in new financing. The conversion of lender debt into company equity under the approve restructuring plan took The Container Store private, and gave ownership to its term loan lenders, which include Golub Capital, LCM Asset Management, and Glendon Capital Management. On March 20th, 2025, Malhotra resigned as CEO, effective immediately, to pursue other opportunities. In the wake of his resignation, the company's board of directors established an Office of the Chief Executive Officer to oversee operations and strategy. The office was led by board chairman Joel Bines and Chief Commercial Officer Martin Schumacher, with independent board member Mike Nicholson serving as special adviser.

On April 24, 2026, The Container Store launched a "Store Changing" event to liquidate up to 30% of existing inventory to make room for Bed Bath & Beyond products. All remaining 98 locations would be rebranded as The Container Store / Bed Bath & Beyond following the $150 million acquisition by Bed Bath & Beyond, Inc. In May 2026, The Container Store and Bed Bath & Beyond opened their first co-branded retail location in Fort Worth, Texas. The combined-store format incorporated merchandise and services from both brands, with Bed Bath & Beyond products scheduled to roll out across The Container Store’s locations in phases. The merger was completed on July 8, 2026, with The Container Store becoming a wholly owned subsidiary of Bed Bath & Beyond.

== Growth ==
Year	Stores	Revenue (in million dollars)
1998	18	
2004	33	
2006	38	
2016	80	
2021		1 000
2023		848
2024	102	

== Governance ==
=== List of Former CEOs ===
- Kip Tindell (1978 – 2016)
- Melissa Reiff (2016 – 2021)
- Satish Malhotra (2021 – 2025)

=== Office of the Chief Executive Officer ===
- Joel Bines and Martin Schumacher (2025 – present) — joint leaders
- Mike Nicholson (2025 – present) — special adviser
