= Old Environmental Party in Järfälla =

Old Environmental Party in Järfälla (in Swedish: Gamla Miljöpartiet i Järfälla) was a political party in Järfälla, Sweden. Its name implies that it predated the formation of the nationwide Miljöpartiet. The party contested the 1982 municipal elections. It got 585 votes, but failed to win any seats. After the elections a dispute surged between the party and Miljöpartiet, as both parties claimed that the votes for the other party should be counted in the favour of their own party (claiming that voters had been confused by similar names of the parties). The election authorities turned down the requests, saying that the party names were clearly different.

== Sources ==
- Document from the Election Commission of the post-election feud of 1982
