= Björn Savén =

Swedish industrialist

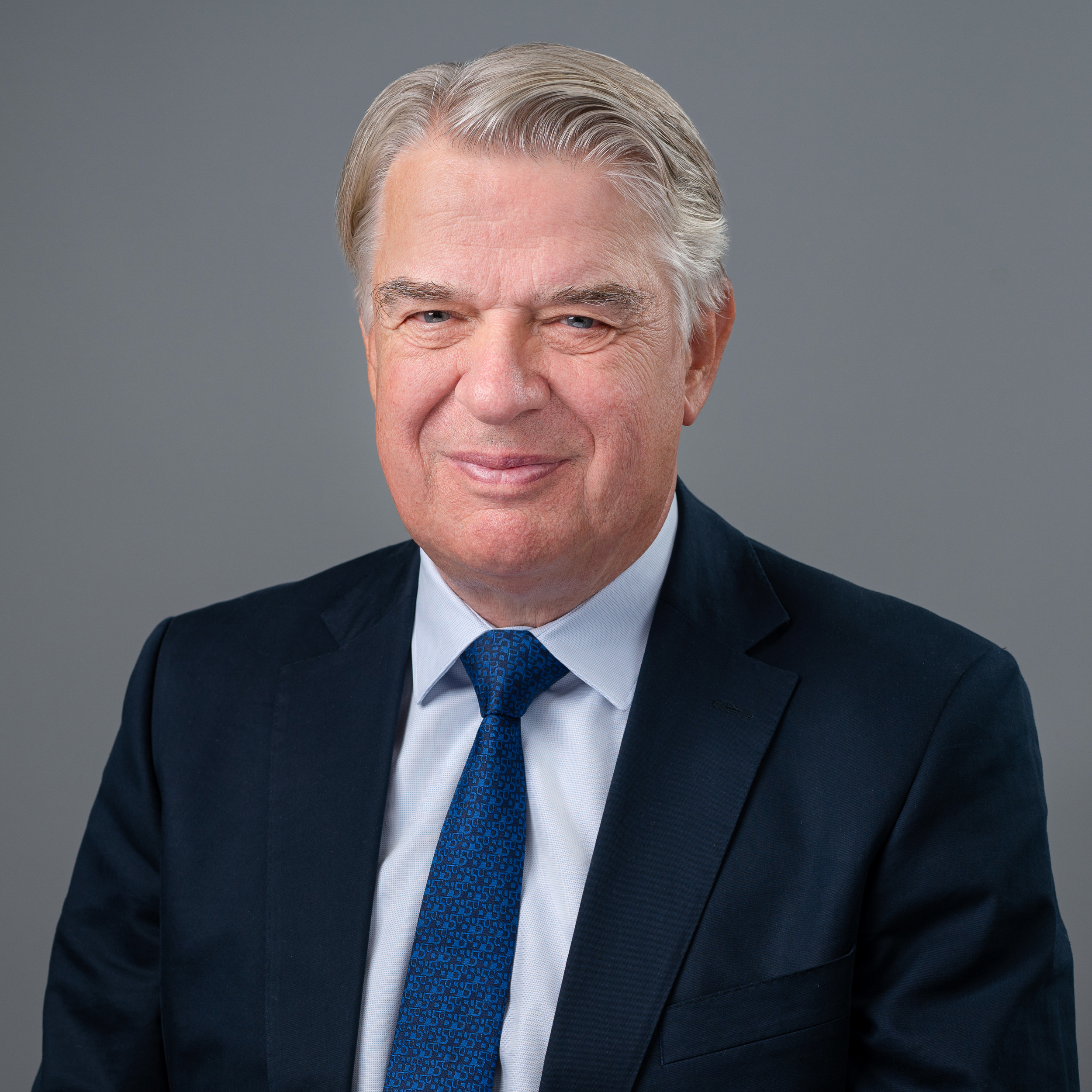
Björn Savén

Bjorn Saven, CBE (born 1950) is a Swedish industrialist and investor. He is the founder and former chairman and chief executive of IK Partners (formerly Industri Kapital) a leading European private equity firm focused on acquisitions across the Nordics, Benelux, Germany and France, with funds raised in excess of €20 billion, and invested in over 200 European companies.

== Background ==
Saven was born in Stockholm and grew up there and in Nerike in the middle of Sweden. Bjorn and his wife Inger have three adult children.

== Education ==
Saven holds a degree in business and economics from Stockholm School of Economics 1972 and an MBA from Harvard University 1976.

== Career ==
Prior to founding IK Investment Partners in 1988 (within Enskilda Securities until 1993, part of the SEB Bank Group) Bjorn Saven held various positions at the American oil company Gulf Oil 1972–1974 as well as the Swedish office and retail products group Esselte 1976–1988.

At IK Partners, Saven pioneered Private Equity investments in the Nordics and Continental Europe. He raised the first Private Equity fund in the Northern Europe, focusing mainly on investments in, and development of, mid-cap companies with a hands-on operating approach of working with portfolio businesses. He was Chief Executive from 1989 to 2008 and Executive Chairman 2008 – 2011, chairman from 2011 and emeritus since 2017.

Saven has also been a non-executive director at the Nordic bank Nordea, Swedish industrial group Alfa Laval (deputy chairman), Swedish energy group Vattenfall AB, Norwegian consumer goods group Orkla ASA, and Finnish industrial cranes manufacturer Konecranes Oyj (chairman from 1994 to 2003).

Saven was chairman of the British-Swedish Chamber of Commerce in Stockholm for five years and was a director of the Swedish Chamber of Commerce for the United Kingdom 2012-2023 where he was also deputy chairman. He is a member of the Royal Swedish Academy of Engineering Sciences where he was deputy chairman 2008-2011. He is also a member of Utrikespolitiska samfundet (The Swedish Society for International Affairs), a non-profit organisation and parent body of Utrikespolitiska institutet, (The Swedish Institute of International Affairs (UI)).

== Received awards ==
Saven has been awarded several orders, decorations and medals by governments, universities and other institutions throughout Europe, including:

- H.M. The King's Medal, Sweden (12th size w. the Seraphimer Ribbon) for services to industry (2008)
- Knight Commander of the Order of Merit of Poland (2022)
- Grand Cross of the Order of Merit of the Portuguese Republic (2026)
- Officier of the Legion of Honour, France (2021)
- Commander of the Order of the British Empire (CBE)
- Knight 1st Class of the Federal Republic of Germany
- Commander of the Republic of Finland
- Commander of the Kingdom of Belgium
- University of Tartu, Star of Appreciation, 2025

Saven has also received honorary doctorates from Stockholm School of Economics, Hanken in Helsinki, and the Institute of Technology at Lund University.

== Philanthropy ==
- Trustee of the National Portrait Gallery in London 2017–2024, and Chairman of the Investment Committee
- Member of Lund University European Spallation Source Industrial Advisory Board from 2020
- Trustee of UK prenatal care charity Tommy's 2015-2023
- Member of the board of the Heart/Lung Foundation of Sweden from 2023
