= Järfälla Municipality =

Järfälla Municipality Järfälla kommun
- Municipality
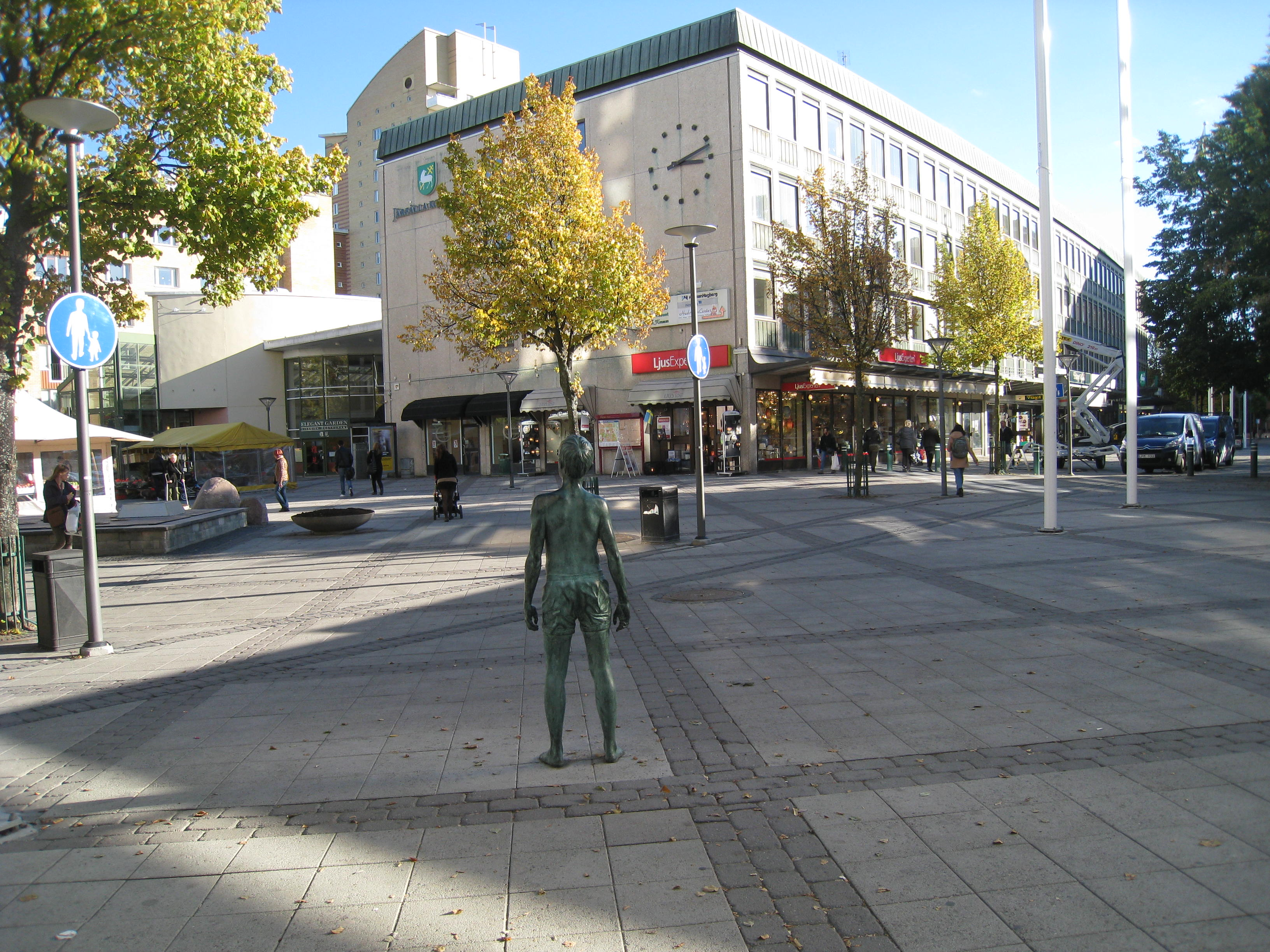

- Coat of arms

- Coordinates: 59°26′N 17°50′E
- Country: Sweden
- County: Stockholm County
- Seat: Jakobsberg

Area
  - Total: 63.02 km^{2} (24.33 sq mi)
  - Land: 53.81 km^{2} (20.78 sq mi)
  - Water: 9.21 km^{2} (3.56 sq mi)
- Area as of 1 January 2014.

Population (30 June 2025)
  - Total: 89,827
  - Density: 1,669/km^{2} (4,324/sq mi)
- Time zone: UTC+1 (CET)
  - Summer (DST): UTC+2 (CEST)
- ISO 3166 code: SE
- Province: Uppland
- Municipal code: 0123
- Website: www.jarfalla.se
- Density is calculated using land area only.

Järfälla Municipality (Swedish: Järfälla kommun) is a municipality in Stockholm County in east central Sweden, and is considered a suburb of Stockholm. Its seat is located in Jakobsberg, part of the Stockholm urban area.

Järfälla has not been amalgamated with other municipalities in the two local government reforms carried out during the 20th century. The Stäket area in the north was, however, added in 1952.

It is located about 20 km north of Stockholm, with a part situated by the shore of Lake Mälaren. It takes about 20 minutes to reach downtown Stockholm by Stockholm commuter rail.

== History ==
Järfälla traces its history to the Stone Age and has some ruins from that time. After being Christianized in the 11th century, a church was built around the year 1200 that still stands today. Järfälla continued to be of some importance in the Middle Ages as several important roads went through it. Furthermore, the centre of the hundred was located within the boundaries of the municipality from 1675 to 1905

Its coat of arms, which depicts a golden lamb carrying an archbishop's cross, can be traced from 1568, but was created in 1955. They may symbolize that Järfälla is situated on the road from the capital Stockholm to the seat of the archbishop in the nearby city of Uppsala.

The main population expansion came in the 1930s and 1940s, when many residential houses were built in the seat Jakobsberg for middle-class families commuting to Stockholm.

== Public transportation ==
The municipality is served by the Stockholm public transport system. There are three Stockholm commuter rail stations, Barkarby, Jakobsberg and Kallhäll, as well as a bus network. As part of a larger plan for the Stockholm region, Barkarby station and Barkarbystaden will get metro stations, scheduled to open in 2027. The representatives for the municipalities signed the deal in January 2014, and on 3 March 2014 Järfälla municipal council made the formal decision to fulfill their part of the deal.

== Demography ==
Population development in Järfälla Municipality 1970–2019
| Year | Population |
|---|---|
| 1970 | 49,261 |
| 1975 | 51,549 |
| 1980 | 53,321 |
| 1985 | 56,020 |
| 1990 | 56,359 |
| 1995 | 58,675 |
| 2000 | 60,471 |
| 2005 | 61,743 |
| 2010 | 66,211 |
| 2015 | 72,429 |
| 2017 | 76,453 |
| 2019 | 79,990 |
Source: SCB - Folkmängd efter region och år.

=== 2022 by district ===
This is a demographic table based on Järfälla Municipality's electoral districts in the 2022 Swedish general election sourced from SVT's election platform, in turn taken from SCB official statistics.

In total there were 82,998 residents, including 57,777 Swedish citizens of voting age. 50.7% voted for the left coalition and 46.8% for the right coalition. Indicators are in percentage points except population totals and income.

| Location | Residents | Citizen adults | Left vote | Right vote | Employed | Swedish parents | Foreign heritage | Income SEK | Degree |
| Location | | | % | % | | | | | |
|---|---|---|---|---|---|---|---|---|---|
| Barkarbystaden | 2,978 | 2,227 | 57.2 | 40.3 | 80 | 44 | 56 | 29,850 | 50 |
| Berghem/Polhem | 2,649 | 1,885 | 43.9 | 54.5 | 85 | 63 | 37 | 33,036 | 54 |
| Bolinder strand | 1,817 | 1,583 | 47.3 | 50.7 | 89 | 74 | 26 | 34,766 | 62 |
| Centrala Jakobsberg | 1,541 | 1,098 | 58.7 | 39.1 | 72 | 32 | 68 | 20,723 | 45 |
| Centrala Kallhäll | 2,262 | 1,700 | 57.1 | 40.6 | 82 | 62 | 38 | 27,323 | 55 |
| Centrala Viksjö N | 2,168 | 1,594 | 48.6 | 48.7 | 75 | 55 | 45 | 23,986 | 34 |
| Centrala Viksjö S | 2,247 | 1,654 | 47.6 | 51.3 | 85 | 68 | 32 | 28,198 | 45 |
| Dackevägen | 2,026 | 1,161 | 57.9 | 37.9 | 72 | 25 | 75 | 21,626 | 35 |
| Ekedal | 2,386 | 1,573 | 62.1 | 35.4 | 69 | 29 | 71 | 21,121 | 39 |
| Emaljvägen/Kopparv. | 2,313 | 1,603 | 56.8 | 41.4 | 79 | 50 | 50 | 24,802 | 45 |
| Fastebol | 2,122 | 1,493 | 43.4 | 55.8 | 85 | 74 | 26 | 34,576 | 53 |
| Fjällen | 1,650 | 1,311 | 48.4 | 50.5 | 85 | 76 | 24 | 33,791 | 53 |
| Grönvreten | 1,500 | 1,072 | 48.2 | 50.3 | 81 | 69 | 31 | 34,005 | 61 |
| Hammaren | 2,418 | 1,705 | 57.9 | 38.5 | 72 | 41 | 59 | 22,229 | 41 |
| Hummelmora | 1,851 | 1,379 | 41.6 | 57.0 | 86 | 72 | 28 | 31,322 | 48 |
| Högby | 1,967 | 1,434 | 45.7 | 52.7 | 84 | 66 | 34 | 31,310 | 50 |
| Kalvshälla | 2,663 | 1,679 | 57.3 | 39.4 | 83 | 37 | 63 | 29,706 | 52 |
| Karlslund | 1,518 | 982 | 53.3 | 44.3 | 83 | 37 | 63 | 30,779 | 55 |
| Kolarängen/Villast. | 2,158 | 1,480 | 46.0 | 52.3 | 81 | 64 | 36 | 28,723 | 41 |
| Lilla Ulvsättra | 1,636 | 952 | 62.2 | 33.2 | 66 | 28 | 72 | 19,798 | 29 |
| Lund | 1,610 | 1,204 | 44.7 | 54.2 | 82 | 72 | 28 | 29,483 | 38 |
| Lädersättra | 2,288 | 1,622 | 56.3 | 41.9 | 80 | 53 | 47 | 26,300 | 46 |
| Neptuni | 2,391 | 1,699 | 45.8 | 52.2 | 83 | 64 | 36 | 32,469 | 47 |
| Norra Aspnäs | 1,070 | 704 | 54.1 | 42.4 | 71 | 37 | 63 | 21,746 | 41 |
| Norra Barkarby | 1,854 | 1,330 | 58.2 | 39.3 | 76 | 61 | 39 | 24,366 | 45 |
| Nyberg | 1,541 | 871 | 67.6 | 27.2 | 65 | 15 | 85 | 18,015 | 36 |
| Olovslund | 2,166 | 1,564 | 42.5 | 55.6 | 81 | 66 | 34 | 33,213 | 58 |
| Orgona | 1,939 | 1,307 | 48.2 | 50.8 | 85 | 65 | 35 | 30,960 | 51 |
| Sandvik | 2,064 | 1,508 | 47.6 | 50.7 | 85 | 71 | 29 | 31,943 | 47 |
| Skälby Gård V | 1,922 | 1,222 | 39.1 | 58.4 | 86 | 68 | 32 | 35,169 | 52 |
| Skälby Gård Ö | 1,742 | 1,205 | 35.0 | 63.1 | 84 | 69 | 31 | 35,125 | 52 |
| Snapphanen | 1,623 | 1,030 | 65.0 | 25.4 | 66 | 19 | 81 | 18,712 | 29 |
| Stäket | 2,623 | 1,867 | 40.3 | 58.0 | 83 | 70 | 30 | 35,046 | 53 |
| Södra Aspnäs | 2,522 | 1,846 | 60.3 | 37.0 | 70 | 34 | 66 | 20,667 | 34 |
| Södra Barkarby | 2,230 | 1,603 | 43.5 | 54.8 | 82 | 68 | 32 | 32,045 | 60 |
| Södra Nyberg | 1,556 | 941 | 62.0 | 32.7 | 70 | 27 | 73 | 21,734 | 33 |
| Södra Vibblaby | 1,603 | 1,003 | 52.9 | 43.7 | 83 | 33 | 67 | 29,289 | 53 |
| Tallbohov | 1,544 | 926 | 62.5 | 27.9 | 66 | 15 | 85 | 18,267 | 33 |
| Ulvsättra/Skogstorp | 1,308 | 885 | 50.6 | 47.1 | 81 | 63 | 37 | 28,940 | 52 |
| Vattmyra | 1,997 | 1,465 | 49.5 | 49.0 | 82 | 56 | 44 | 31,160 | 55 |
| Vibblaby | 1,795 | 1,204 | 54.8 | 41.7 | 75 | 46 | 54 | 23,622 | 51 |
| Västerby | 1,740 | 1,206 | 53.4 | 44.2 | 81 | 53 | 47 | 26,434 | 46 |
Source: SVT

=== Residents with a foreign background ===
On 31 December 2017 the number of people with a foreign background (persons born outside of Sweden or with two parents born outside of Sweden) was 31,031, or 40.59% of the population (76,453 on 31 December 2017). On 31 December 2002 the number of residents with a foreign background was (per the same definition) 15,550, or 25.37% of the population (61,290 on 31 December 2002). On 31 December 2017 there were 76,453 residents in Järfälla, of whom 22,215 people (29.06%) were born in a country other than Sweden. These are divided by country in the table below; the Nordic countries as well as the 12 most common countries of birth outside of Sweden for Swedish residents have been included, with other countries of birth bundled together by continent by Statistics Sweden.

Country of birth
31 December 2017
| 1 | Sweden | 54,238 |
| 2 | Asia: Other countries | 2,815 |
| 3 | Iraq | 2,295 |
| 4 | European Union: Other countries | 2,187 |
| 5 | Iran | 1,895 |
| 6 | Finland | 1,827 |
| 7 | Syria | 1,753 |
| 8 | Africa: Other countries | 1,478 |
| 9 | South America | 1,380 |
| 10 | Poland | 1,176 |
| 11 | Somalia | 856 |
| 12 | Europe outside of the EU: other countries | 781 |
| 13 | Turkey | 768 |
| 14 | Eritrea | 620 |
| 15 | Thailand | 420 |
| 16 | Afghanistan | 351 |
| 17 | Germany | 350 |
| 18 | North America | 328 |
| 19 | Bosnia and Herzegovina | 214 |
| 20 | Yugoslavia/Yugoslavia; SFR Yugoslavia/Serbia and Montenegro | 203 |
| 21 | Norway | 196 |
| 22 | Denmark | 141 |
| 23 | Soviet Union | 82 |
| 24 | Iceland | 43 |
| 25 | Oceania | 41 |
| 26 | Unknown country of birth | 15 |

== Districts ==
- Viksjö
- Jakobsberg
- Barkarby
- Skälby
- Kallhäll
- Stäket

== Sports ==
The following sports clubs are located in Järfälla:

=== Football clubs ===
- AFC Järfälla
- FC Järfälla
- FC Järfälla Academy
- IFK Viksjö
- Bele Barkarby FF
- Kallhälls FF
- Järfälla FF
- IF Söderhöjden Wasa

=== Floorball clubs ===
- Jakobsbergs IBF
- Järfälla Spiders
- Stäkets IF
- Bele Barkarby IF

=== Basketball clubs ===
- Järfälla Basket

=== Ice hockey clubs ===
- Järfälla HC
- Kallhälls IF
- Bele Barkarby IF

== See also ==
- Elfa AB (1945)
- Old Environmental Party in Järfälla
