= Elfa International =

Elfa International AB
- Type: Aktiebolag (AB)
- Industry: Storage solutions (sliding doors, interior system)
- Founded: 1948
- Founder: Arne Lydmar
- Headquarters: Malmö, Sweden
- Key people: Anders Rothstein (CEO)
- Number of employees: 501 (FY2019)
- Website: https://elfa.com/en

Elfa is a storage solution company that is headquartered in Malmö, Sweden. The company was founded in 1948 by the Swedish engineer Arne Lydmar. The Elfa corporate group consists of three manufacturing entities and seven sales companies in Europe. The group employs about 501 people and the turnover is approximately SEK 1 203 M (FY2019).

== Products ==
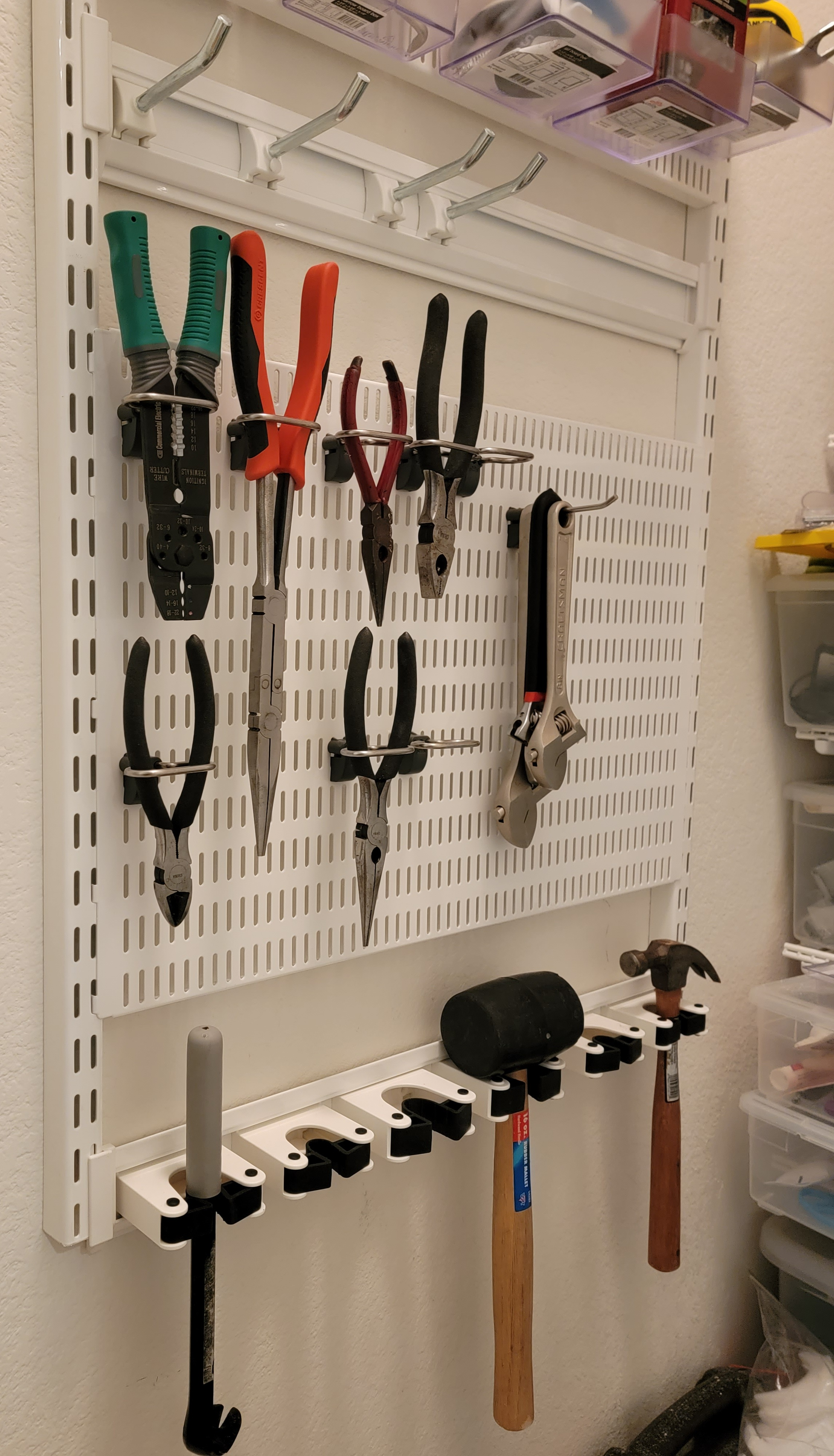
Elfa shelving for tools

Elfa markets its products under the brand Elfa. The product assortment includes drawer-, shelving systems in steel and made-to-measure sliding doors. The product assortment is sold mainly through retailers within the DIY, builders’ merchants and furniture/specialty segment in about 20 markets via subsidiaries or independent distributors.

== Owner ==
Since 1999, the company has been owned by The Container Store, the largest U.S. retail chain in the storage category. The Container Store is listed on the NYSE.
