= Elfa AB =

Swedish Electronics Supplier

Swedish company ELFA, which distributes electronics components, instruments, tools, and books to business and private customers, was founded in 1945 by Arne Lydmar and Nils "Nisse" Jensen. As of 2006 it had 450 employees, and a turnaround of roughly SEK 845 million. ELFA is headquartered in Järfälla, outside Stockholm. In August 2006, ELFA was acquired by IK Partners’ (formerly Industri Kapital) IK 2004 Fund from the Jensen family. In May 2007 ELFA bought the Estonian-based Tevalo group. In 2008 it was bought by the Swiss company Dätwyler.

Since 1945, ELFA has published its regionally well-known catalog which currently contains listings of more than 65,000 products, and is printed in 134,000 copies (2006). The printed catalog is supplemented by a website with online ordering and datasheet viewing/downloading. Many of the private customers are electronics hobbyists, who are also offered do-it-yourself electronics kits of various types. Daughter companies of ELFA are located in Finland, Norway, Denmark, and Poland. After the acquisition of Tevalo also in Estonia, Latvia, Lithuania, and Ukraine. A network of electronics retailers represent the company in several European countries.
