= List of metropolitan areas in Sweden =

Sweden has three metropolitan areas consisting of the areas surrounding the three largest cities, Stockholm, Gothenburg, and Malmö. The statistics have been retrieved from Statistics Sweden and the statistics released on 10 November 2014. The official land areas for each municipality have also been retrieved from Statistics Sweden, the agency that defines these areas.

== Population centers ==
As of 2018, Sweden had two metropolitan areas with a population of over 1,000,000 people each.

The following table shows the populations of the top ten metropolitan areas.

| Leading population centers | | | | | |
|---|---|---|---|---|---|
| Rank | Core city (cities) | Metro area population | County | Region | Stockholm Gothenburg Malmö Uppsala |
| 1 | Stockholm | 2,308,143 | Stockholm County | Svealand | Stockholm Gothenburg Malmö Uppsala |
| 2 | Gothenburg | 1,021,831 | Västra Götaland County | Götaland | Stockholm Gothenburg Malmö Uppsala |
| 3 | Malmö | 669,471 | Skåne County | Götaland | Stockholm Gothenburg Malmö Uppsala |
| 4 | Uppsala | 294,689 | Uppsala County | Svealand | Stockholm Gothenburg Malmö Uppsala |
| 5 | Helsingborg | 242,540 | Skåne County | Götaland | Stockholm Gothenburg Malmö Uppsala |
| 6 | Linköping | 207,052 | Östergötland County | Götaland | Stockholm Gothenburg Malmö Uppsala |
| 7 | Örebro | 206,344 | Örebro County | Svealand | Stockholm Gothenburg Malmö Uppsala |
| 8 | Västerås | 198,800 | Västmanland County | Svealand | Stockholm Gothenburg Malmö Uppsala |
| 9 | Jönköping | 170,494 | Jönköping County | Götaland | Stockholm Gothenburg Malmö Uppsala |
| 10 | Norrköping | 163,368 | Östergötland County | Götaland | Stockholm Gothenburg Malmö Uppsala |
| Based on 2018 functional urban areas population estimates from Eurostat | | | | | Stockholm Gothenburg Malmö Uppsala |

== Metropolitan Stockholm ==
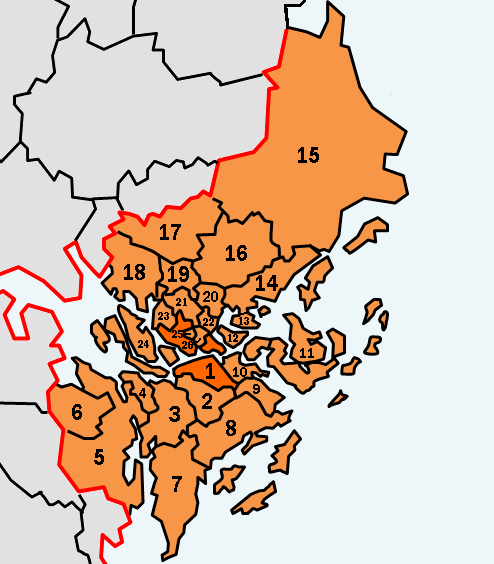

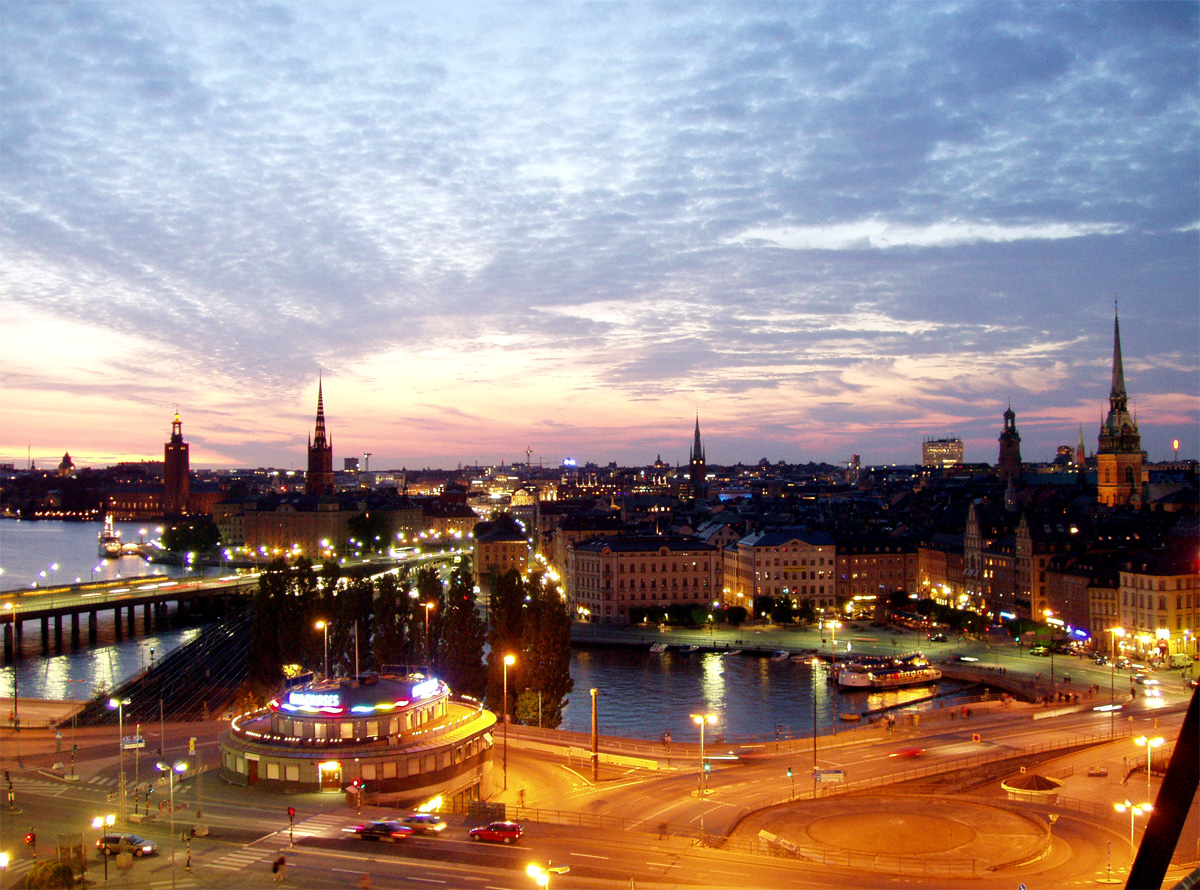
Central Stockholm and Old Town

Metropolitan Stockholm (also known as Greater Stockholm or, in Swedish, Storstockholm) is a metropolitan area surrounding the Swedish capital of Stockholm. Since 2005, Metropolitan Stockholm is defined by official Swedish Statistics as all of Stockholm County. It is the largest of the three metropolitan areas in Sweden.

Metropolitan Stockholm is divided into five areas: Stockholm City Centre, Söderort, Västerort of Stockholm Municipality; and the northern suburbs and southern suburbs, which consists of several municipalities.

| Municipality | Population | Area^{[1]} | Density^{[2]} | Part |
|---|---|---|---|---|
| Stockholm | 914,909 | 187.17 | 4,861.76 | Centre, West, South |
| Huddinge | 104,353 | 131.01 | 795.01 | Southern Suburbs (Södermanland) |
| Botkyrka | 89,142 | 194.17 | 451.05 | Southern Suburbs (Södermanland) |
| Salem | 16,201 | 54.09 | 297.76 | Southern Suburbs (Södermanland) |
| Södertälje | 92,490 | 525.15 | 175.18 | Southern Suburbs (Södermanland) |
| Nykvarn | 9,862 | 152.76 | 63.52 | Southern Suburbs (Södermanland) |
| Nynäshamn | 27,168 | 358.76 | 75.16 | Southern Suburbs (Södermanland) |
| Haninge | 92,095 | 458.07 | 179.04 | Southern Suburbs (Södermanland) |
| Tyresö | 45,629 | 69.25 | 651.94 | Southern Suburbs (Södermanland) |
| Nacka | 96,420 | 95.12 | 1,005.61 | Southern Suburbs (Södermanland) |
| Värmdö | 40,660 | 448.03 | 89.91 | Northern Suburbs (Uppland) |
| Lidingö | 45,598 | 30.80 | 1,476.23 | Northern Suburbs (Uppland) |
| Vaxholm | 11,385 | 57.88 | 195.51 | Northern Suburbs (Uppland) |
| Österåker | 41,317 | 312.40 | 131.33 | Northern Suburbs (Uppland) |
| Norrtälje | 57,694 | 2016.04 | 28.50 | Northern Suburbs (Uppland) |
| Vallentuna | 32,008 | 358.36 | 88.96 | Northern Suburbs (Uppland) |
| Sigtuna | 44,174 | 327.40 | 134.46 | Northern Suburbs (Uppland) |
| Upplands-Bro | 25,370 | 235.47 | 107.15 | Northern Suburbs (Uppland) |
| Upplands Väsby | 41,883 | 75.09 | 556.49 | Northern Suburbs (Uppland) |
| Täby | 67,519 | 60.72 | 1,109.24 | Northern Suburbs (Uppland) |
| Sollentuna | 69,525 | 52.64 | 1,314.27 | Northern Suburbs (Uppland) |
| Danderyd | 32,286 | 26.40 | 1,222.01 | Northern Suburbs (Uppland) |
| Järfälla | 71,130 | 53.81 | 1,306.11 | Northern Suburbs (Uppland) |
| Ekerö | 26,770 | 217.68 | 122.30 | Northern Suburbs (Uppland) |
| Sundbyberg | 44,663 | 8.67 | 5,047.64 | Northern Suburbs (Uppland) |
| Solna | 74,273 | 19.30 | 3,834.77 | Northern Suburbs (Uppland) |
| Total | 2,205,105 | 6,526.24 | 335.94 | |

^{1} km^{2}
^{2} Population per km^{2}

== Metropolitan Gothenburg ==
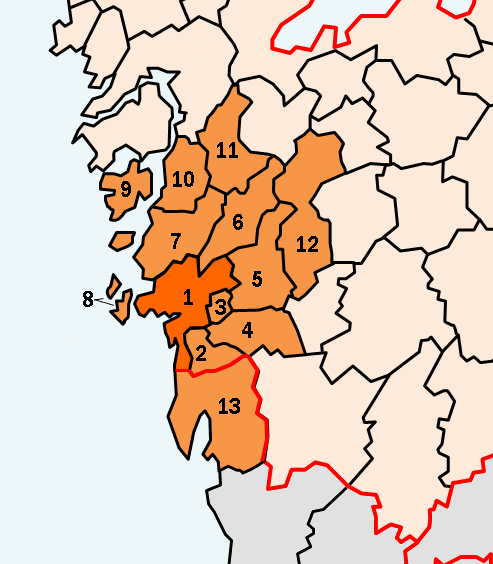

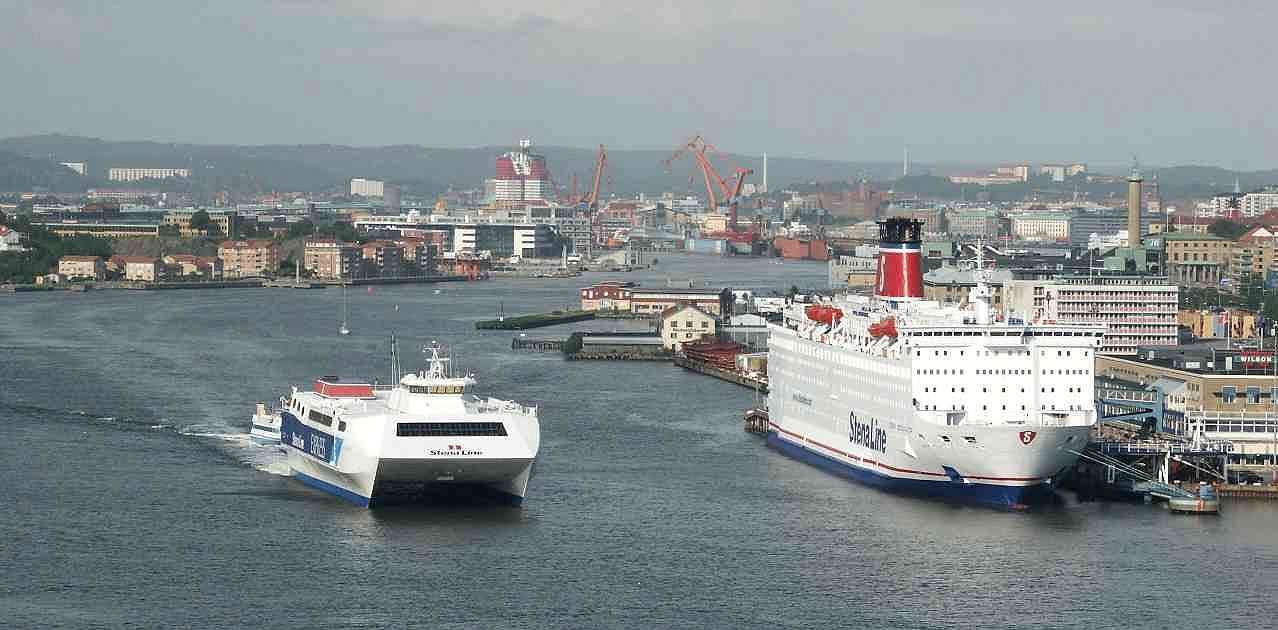
Central Gothenburg and the harbor, the largest in the Nordic Region

Metropolitan Gothenburg (Storgöteborg literally Greater Gothenburg) is a metropolitan area surrounding the city of Gothenburg in Sweden. The metropolitan region is located in Västra Götaland County, except for the municipality of Kungsbacka, which is located to the south in Halland County. As of 2005, the municipalities of Alingsås and Lilla Edet were added to the region. The region is often used for statistical measures, and estimates in the 1960s predicted that the region would have about one million inhabitants in 2000. The region is the second largest metropolitan area in Sweden after Metropolitan Stockholm.

| Municipality | Population | Area^{[1]} | Density^{[2]} |
|---|---|---|---|
| Gothenburg | 565,496 | 447.76 | 1,206.30 |
| Mölndal | 66,733 | 145.84 | 430.05 |
| Partille | 37,931 | 56.83 | 641.62 |
| Härryda | 37,430 | 266.78 | 135.83 |
| Lerum | 41,660 | 258.61 | 153.50 |
| Ale | 30,399 | 316.51 | 89.54 |
| Kungälv | 44,312 | 362.59 | 116.64 |
| Öckerö | 12,930 | 25.74 | 490.09 |
| Tjörn | 15,862 | 167.36 | 90.17 |
| Stenungsund | 26,325 | 251.91 | 100.08 |
| Lilla Edet | 13,948 | 316.23 | 41.05 |
| Alingsås | 40,566 | 472.03 | 82.86 |
| Kungsbacka | 82,382 | 606.67 | 128.73 |
| Total | 1,015,974 | 3,694.86 | 262.25 |

^{1} km^{2}
^{2} Population per km^{2}

== Metropolitan Malmö ==
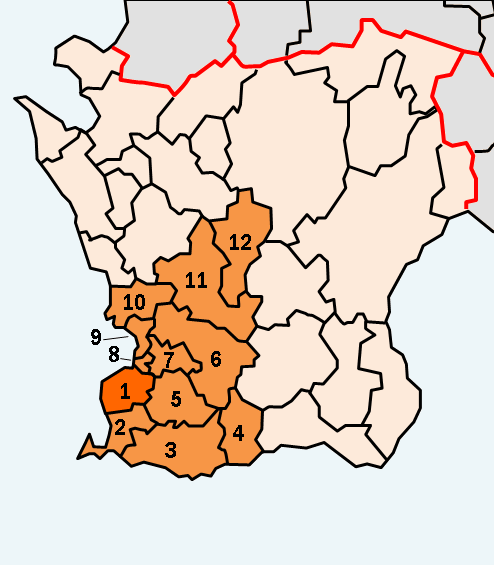

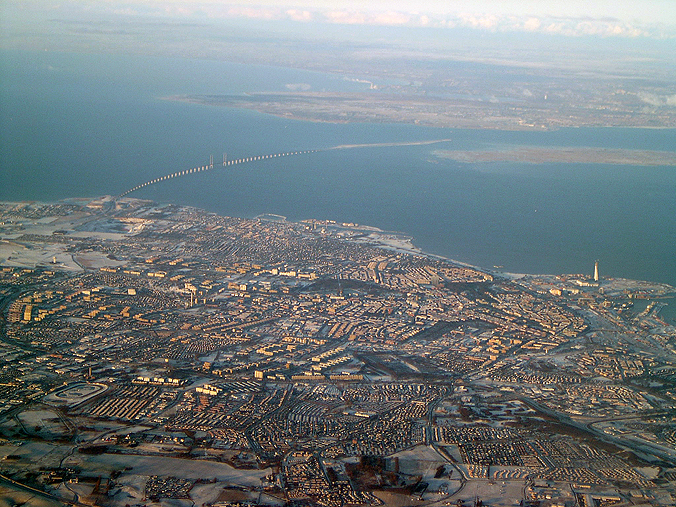
The Øresund strait between Malmö and Copenhagen with Malmö in the foreground and the island of Amager and part of southern Copenhagen in the background

Greater Malmö (Stormalmö), also known as Metropolitan Malmö, is the metropolitan area of Malmö in Sweden. The area is located in Southwestern Scania (Sydvästra Skåne), which is often considered synonymous with Greater Malmö, and it is part of the wider transnational Öresund Region. Besides Malmö, large towns in Greater Malmö includes Lund and Trelleborg, the former of which was the seat of the historical Catholic Archdiocese of Lund.

Since the 1970s, improvements in highways and the regional and InterRegio train networks means the commuting area has grown to include Ystad, Skurup, Sjöbo, Eslöv, Höör, Landskrona and Helsingborg, though only some of these are included in official definitions of Greater Malmö. It's not uncommon to live in Malmö and work either in Ystad or Helsingborg, or vice versa, but these towns have kept their mental allegiance with older divisions of Scania. Commuting across the Öresund has become more common, both through the Øresund Bridge and the HH Ferry route, at which car ferries departs every 12 minutes in summer (every 15 minutes in winter).

Statistics Sweden, which sets the official definitions for all metropolitan areas in Sweden, has changed which municipalities are included in Greater Malmö over time. The most recent change to the definition came in 2006, when Eslöv, Höör, and Skurup Municipalities became part of Greater Malmö, bringing the number of municipalities included from 9 to 12.

| Municipality | Population | Area (km^{2}) | Density (N per km^{2}) |
|---|---|---|---|
| Malmö | 351,749 | 156.95 | 2,241.4 |
| Lund | 123,495 | 426.83 | 289.3 |
| Trelleborg | 44,992 | 340.00 | 132.3 |
| Vellinge | 36,460 | 142.65 | 255.6 |
| Eslöv | 33,667 | 418.96 | 80.4 |
| Kävlinge | 31,536 | 152.45 | 206.9 |
| Lomma | 24,782 | 55.49 | 446.6 |
| Staffanstorp | 24,778 | 106.81 | 232.0 |
| Svedala | 21,654 | 217.71 | 99.5 |
| Burlöv | 18,449 | 18.90 | 976.1 |
| Höör | 16,691 | 290.51 | 57.5 |
| Skurup | 15,731 | 193.42 | 81.3 |
| Total | 733,037 | 2,520.68 | 290.8 |

== See also ==
- Largest metropolitan areas in the Nordic countries
- List of the most populated municipalities in the Nordic countries
- List of metropolitan areas in Europe
- Stockholm urban area
- Largest urban areas of the European Union
