= Gåseborg =

Hillfort in Sweden

Coordinates: 59°24′6″N 17°45′44″E

Gåseborg is a prehistoric hillfort in the Lake Mälaren district in Sweden. The scientists don't know for certain, but most likely it was built to supervise and control the water fairway below the fort, probably sometime during the late iron age (500-1100 AD). Several major fairways passed right here and from this place the local man in power could control the traffic to Uppsala, Sigtuna, Birka and the western districts of Lake Mälaren.

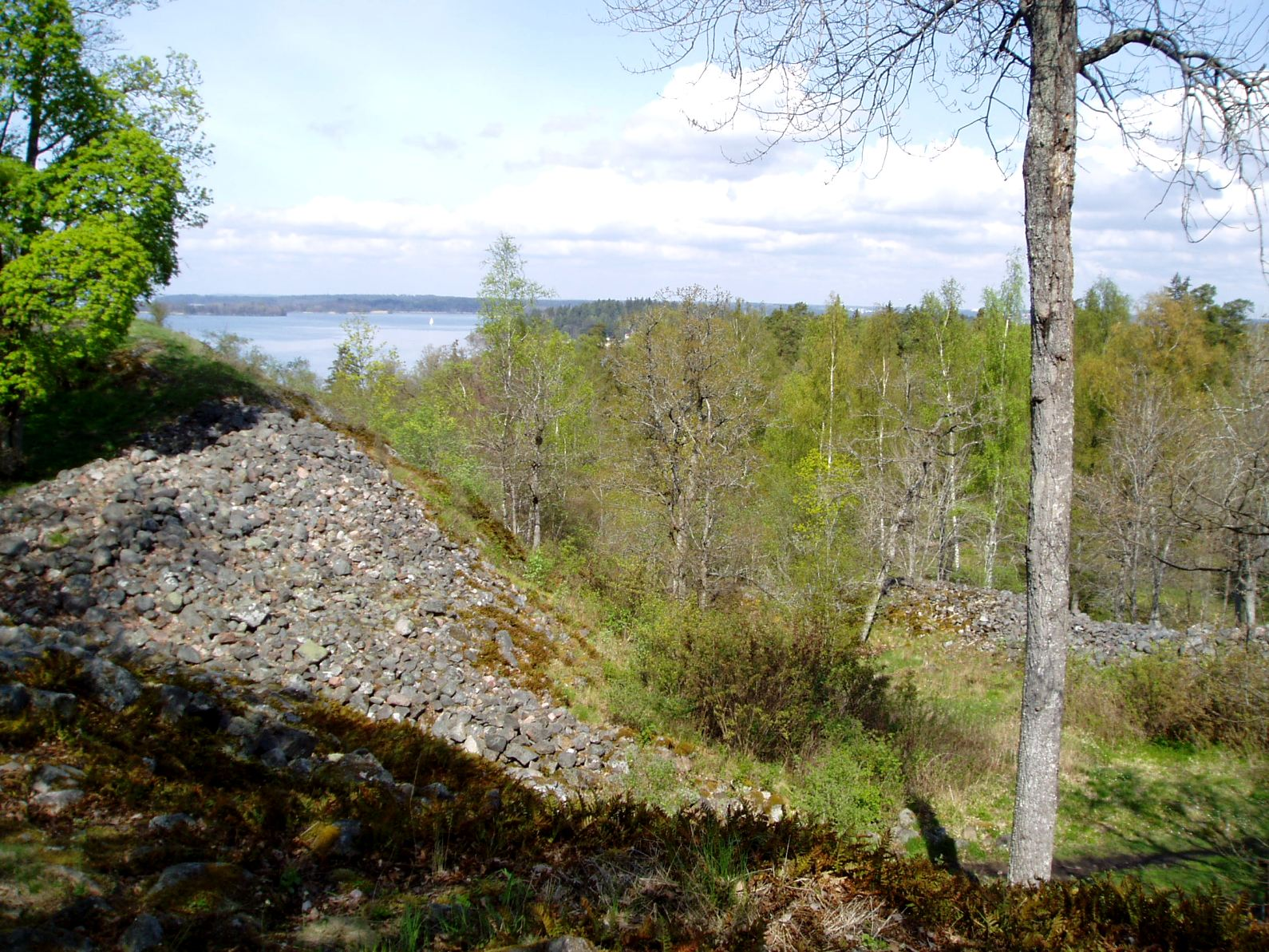
Gåseborg, inner wall to the left and outer wall to the right

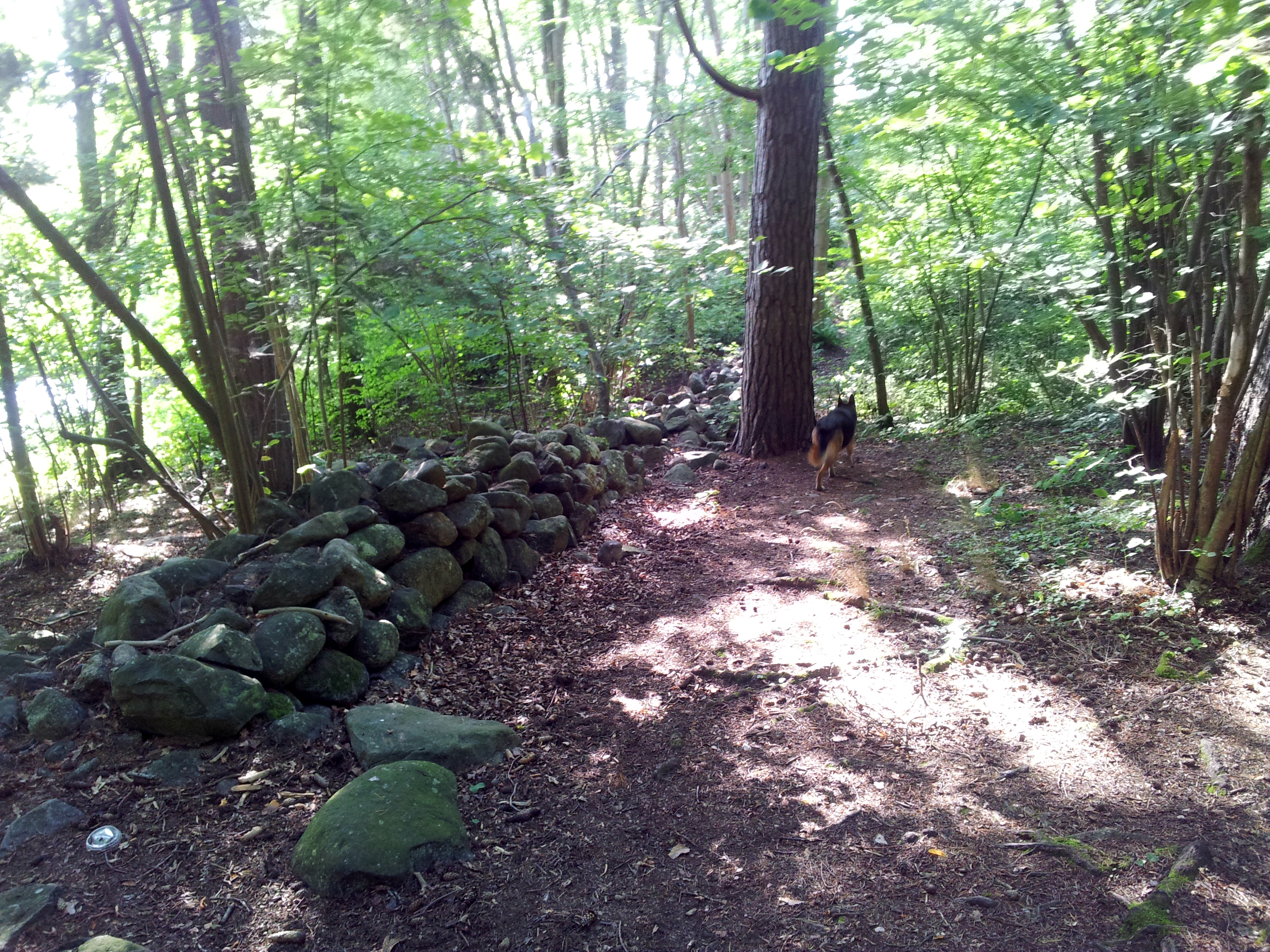
Wall outside Gåseborg

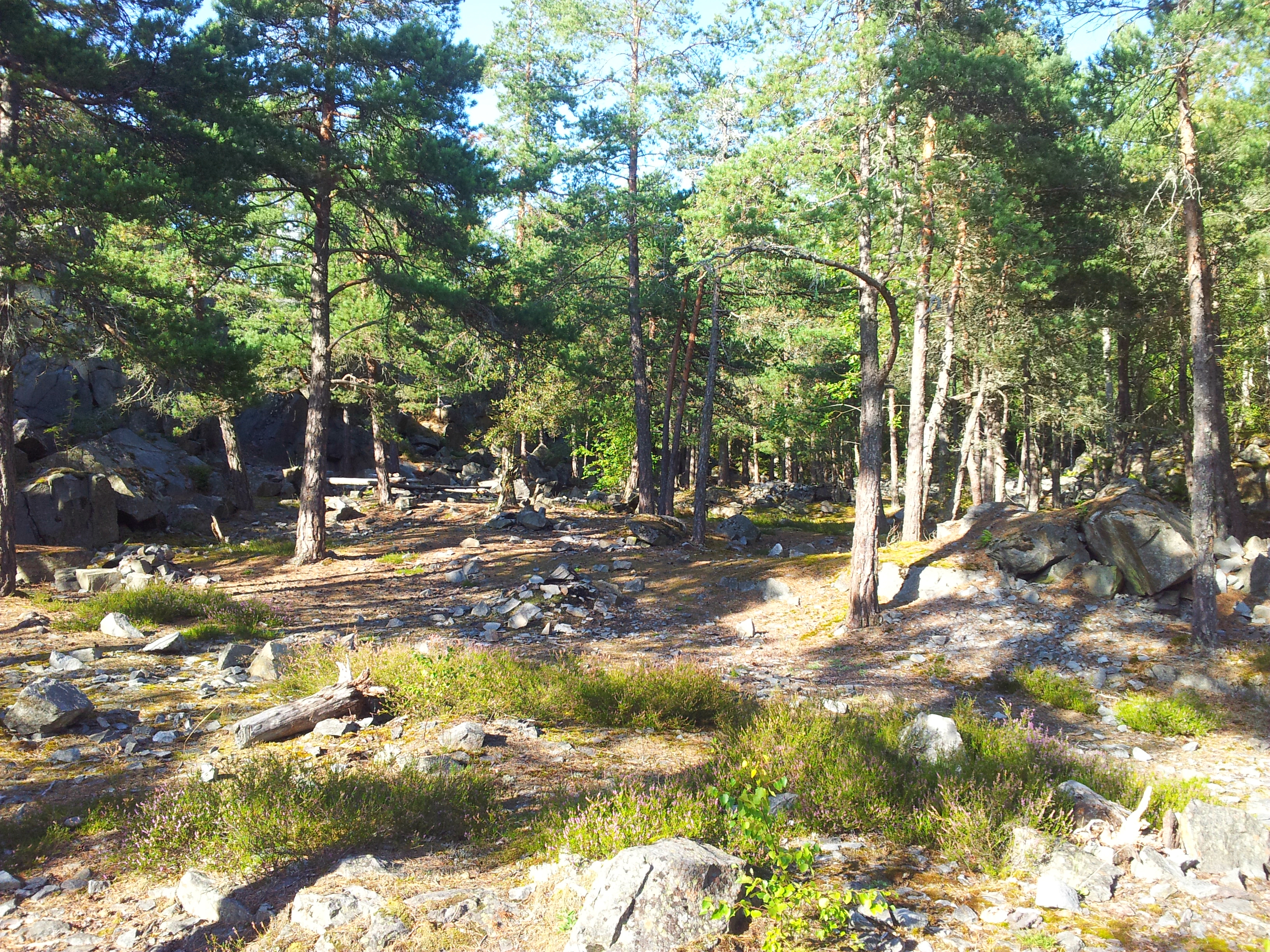
The central part of Gåseborg
