= Stockholm urban area =

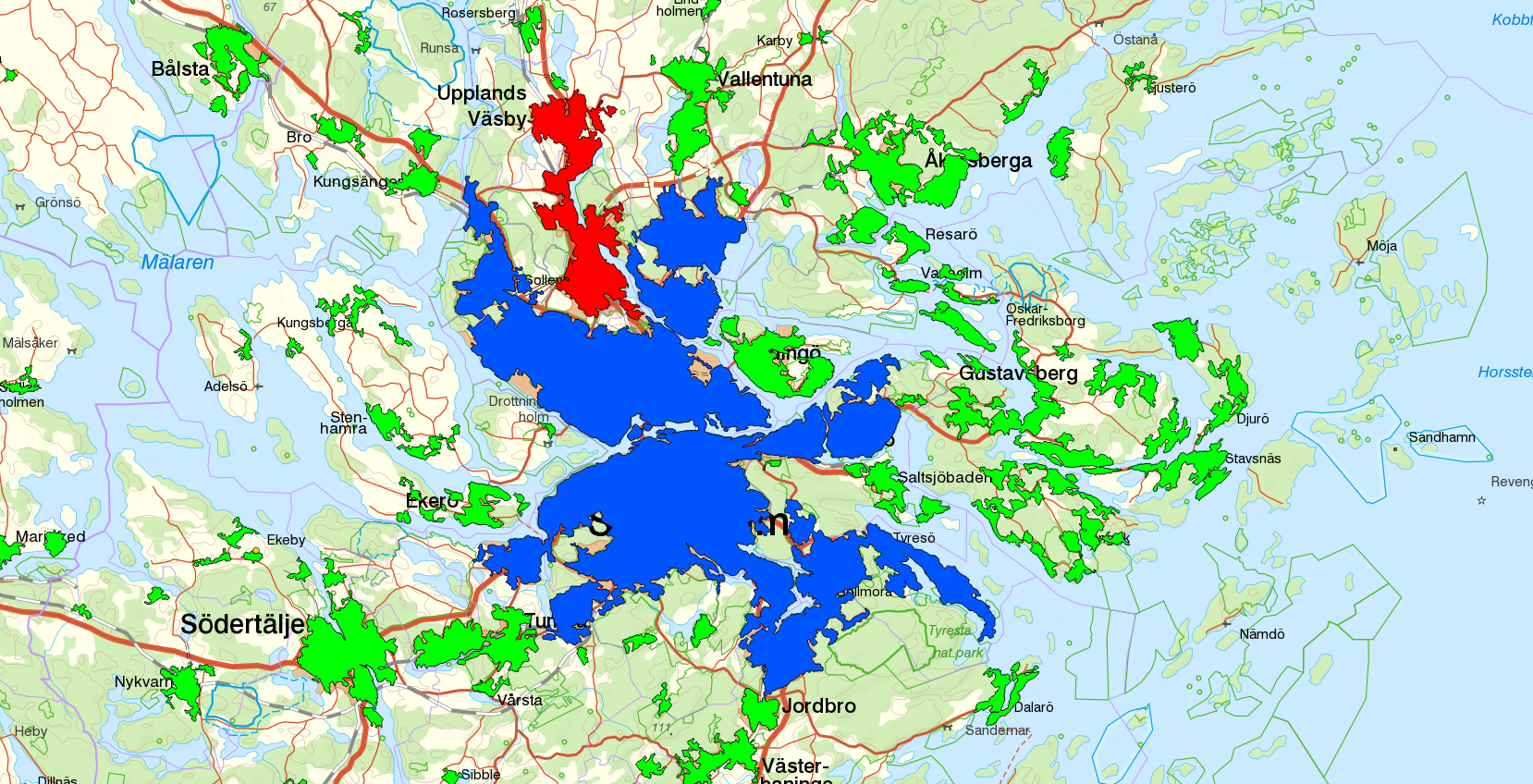
- Stockholm urban area (in blue)

- Location within Stockholm Location within Sweden
- Coordinates: 59°20′N 18°04′E
- Country: Sweden
- Province: Södermanland and Uppland
- County: Stockholm County
- Municipality: 11: Stockholm Municipality; Huddinge Municipality; Järfälla Municipality; Solna Municipality; Sollentuna Municipality; Botkyrka Municipality; Haninge Municipality; Tyresö Municipality; Sundbyberg Municipality; Nacka Municipality; Danderyd Municipality

Area
  - Total: 381.63 km^{2} (147.35 sq mi)

Population (31 December 2019)
  - Total: 1,593,426
  - Density: 4,175/km^{2} (10,810/sq mi)
- Time zone: UTC+1 (CET)
  - Summer (DST): UTC+2 (CEST)

The Stockholm urban area (Swedish: Stockholms tätort) is the largest and most populous of the statistical localities or urban areas in Sweden. It has no administrative function of its own, but constitutes a continuous built-up area, which extends into 11 municipalities in Stockholm County. It contains the municipal seats of 10 of those. As of 31 December 2019, the population in the Stockholm urban area was 1,593,426 inhabitants, the area 381.63 km^{2} (147.35 sq mi), and the population density 4,175 inhabitants/km^{2}. Stockholm urban area is not the same as Metropolitan Stockholm (Storstockholm), which is a much larger area.

In 2019, the population of the urban area and the municipalities into which it extends, broken down per municipality was the following:

Municipality	Population				
Municipality	In Stockholm urban area	In other urban areas	Other	Total	% in Stockholm urban area
Stockholm	974,073	0	1831	975,904	100.0
Huddinge	110,252	1,448	771	112,848	97.7
Järfälla	79,830	0	160	79,990	99.8
Solna	82,429	0	0	82,429	100.0
Sollentuna	68,835	4,313	81	73,857	93.2
Botkyrka	62,156	26,191	2,137	94,606	65.7
Haninge	53,599	27,371	4,806	92,095	58.2
Tyresö	44,370	3,118	402	48,333	91.8
Sundbyberg	52,414	0	0	52,414	100.0
Nacka	38,394	56,085	1,112	105,189	36.5
Danderyd	27,074	5,477	23	32,857	82.4
Total	1,593,426	124,003	9,623	1,750,522	91.0

== See also ==
- For administration and government see the respective municipalities in the list above
- Stockholm
- List of metropolitan areas in Sweden
