= Halkia, Pornainen =

Halkia Halkis
- Village
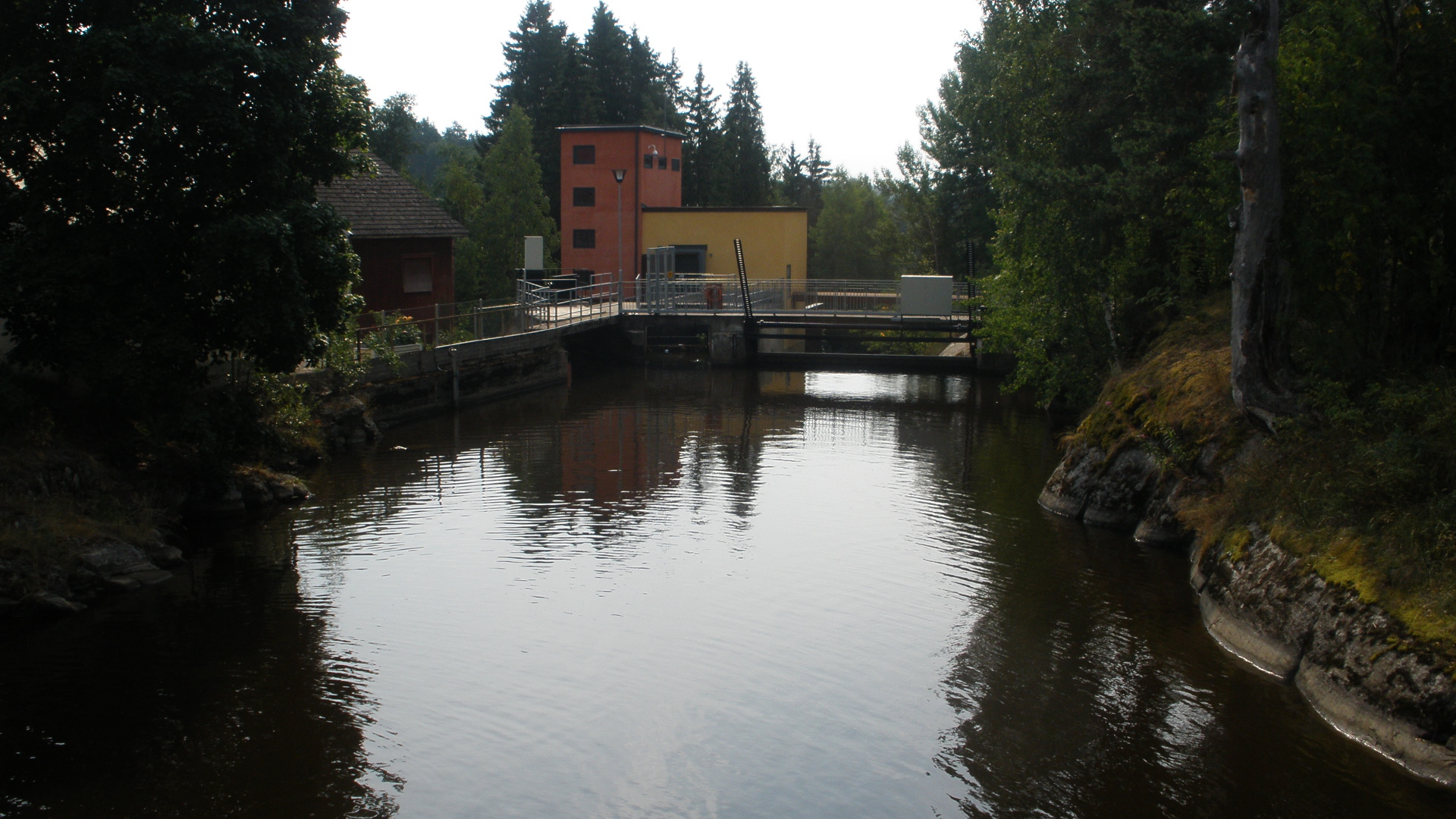
- A hydroelectric power station in Halkia.

- Location in Finland
- Country: Finland
- Region: Uusimaa
- Municipality: Pornainen
- Time zone: UTC+2 (EET)
  - Summer (DST): UTC+3 (EEST)

Halkia (Swedish: Halkis) is a village of 441 inhabitants in the northern part of Pornainen municipality in Uusimaa, Finland, near the border of Mäntsälä municipality. It is only a few kilometers south of Halkia to the center of the municipality, Kirveskoski. The Mustijoki River flows through the village, along which the Halkiakoski Power Plant, which generates electricity for the municipality, has also been built.

== See also ==
- Numminen, Mäntsälä
