= Kirveskoski =

- Village
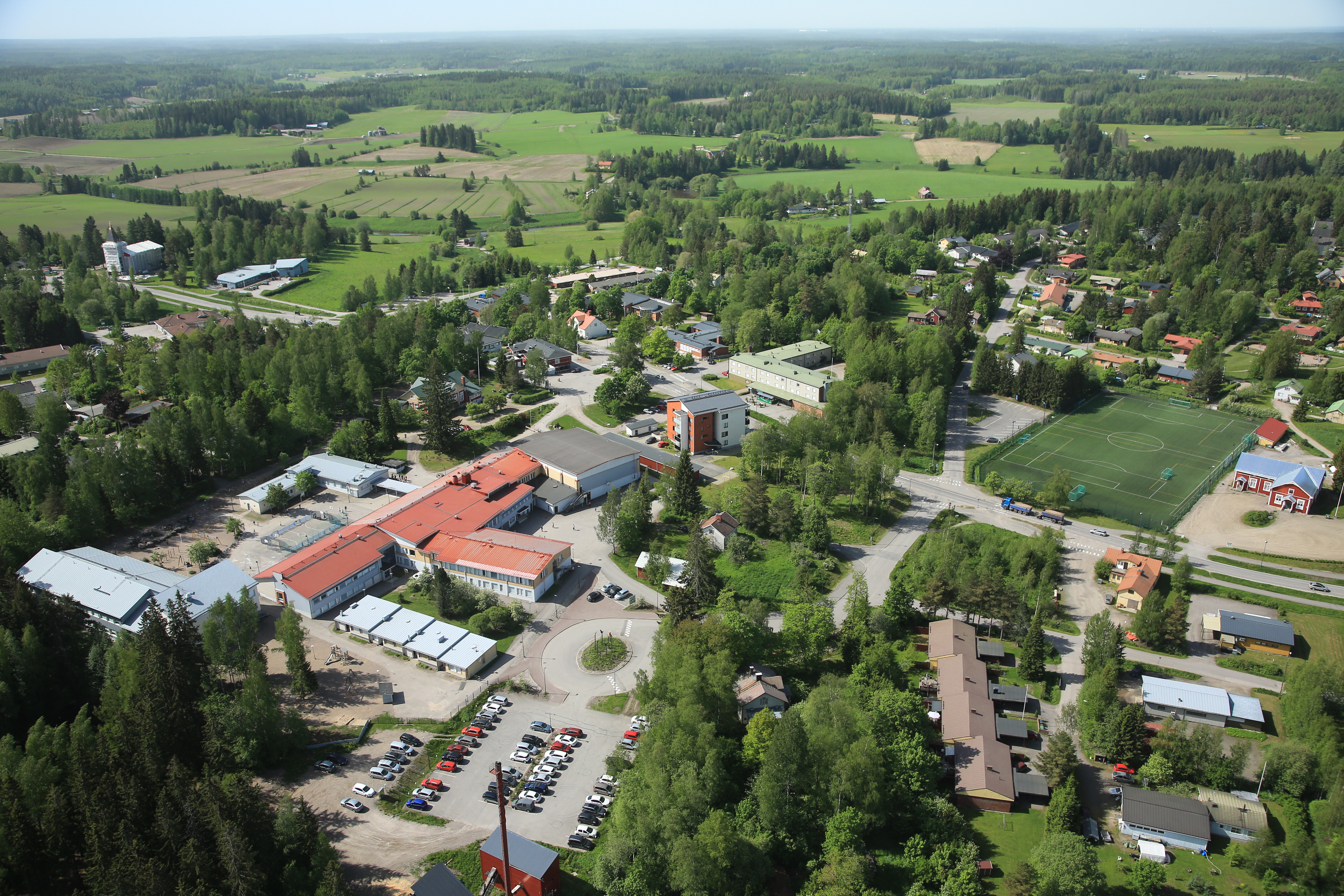
- An aerial view of Kirveskoski.

- Location in Finland
- Coordinates: 60°28.537′N 25°22.496′E
- Country: Finland
- Region: Uusimaa
- Municipality: Pornainen

Area
  - Total: 647 km^{2} (250 sq mi)

Population (2017-12-31)
  - Total: 2,074
  - Density: 3,206/km^{2} (8,300/sq mi)
- Time zone: UTC+2 (EET)
  - Summer (DST): UTC+3 (EEST)
- Postal code: 07170

Kirveskoski (Finnish pronunciation: [ˈkirʋe̞s̠ˌkoski]; officially Pornaisten kirkonkylä) is a village of about 2000 inhabitants in Pornainen, Uusimaa, Finland, and the administrative center of the municipality. Next to the village is the Mustijoki River (Karjakoski by the village), which runs south to Porvoo and from there to the Gulf of Finland.

It is 20 kilometers from Kirveskoski to Järvenpää, 15 kilometers to Sipoo's administrative center Nikkilä, 24 kilometers to Porvoo, 17 kilometers to Askola, and 22 kilometers to Mäntsälä. From the northern part of Kirveskoski, regional road 146 runs west to Järvenpää and regional road 151 east to the village of Monninkylä in Askola municipality, while there is a connecting road 1494, which extends south to Nikkilä and north to national road 25 between Hanko and Mäntsälä.

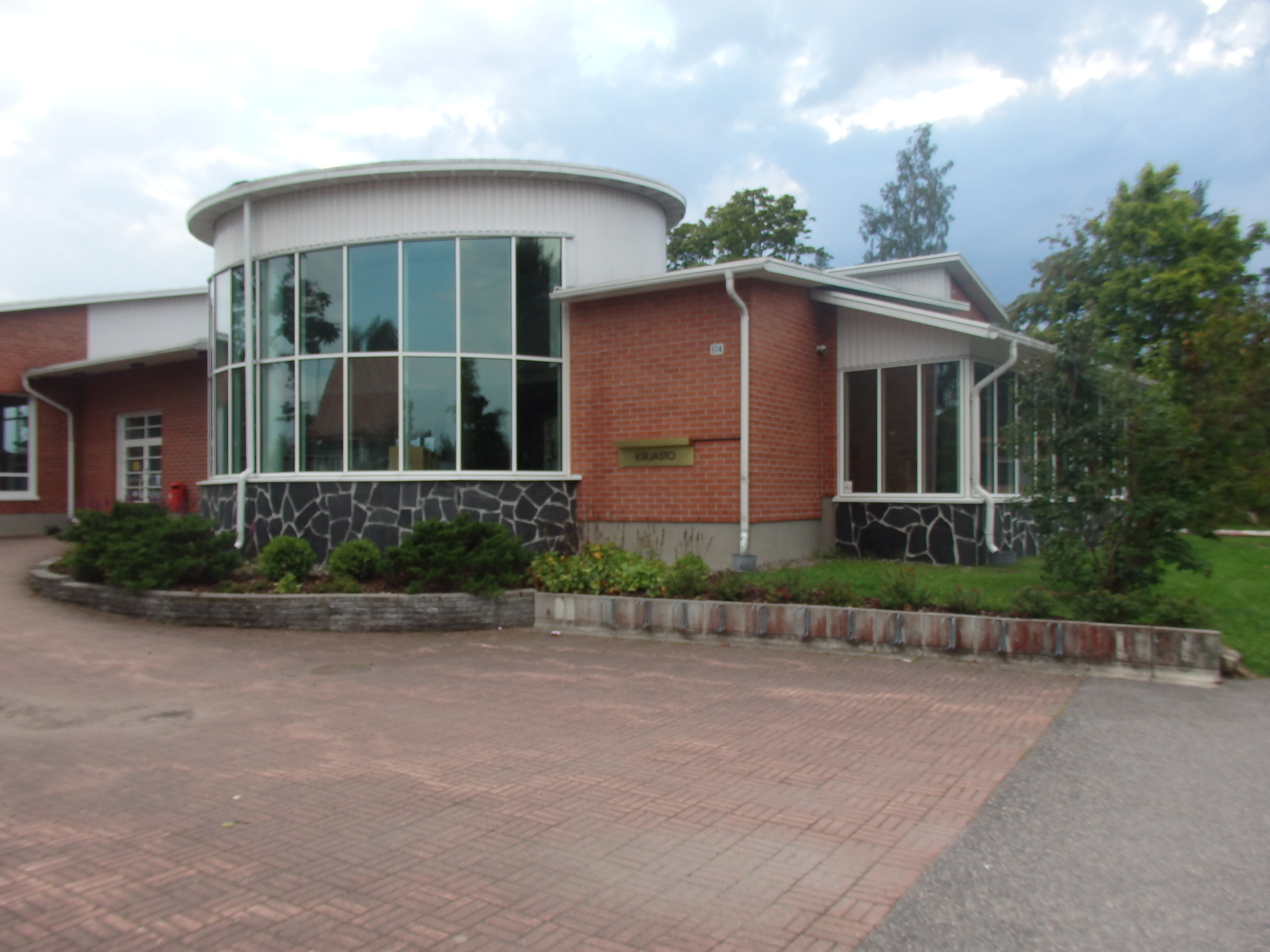
Library of Pornainen in Kirveskoski.

Kirveskoski is home to the stone church of Pornainen, which was built in 1924 and designed by architect Ilmari Launis. In addition, there are two grocery stores in the urban area, K-Market and Sale, the bank office of Itä-Uusimaa Osuuspankki, a comprehensive school, a local museum, a library, a retirement home, a fire station, the restaurant Pizza Burger House, and SEO and St1 filling stations. In the southern part of the village is Lake Kotojärvi, which is the largest of the municipal lakes, and next to it is the village of Laukkoski.

The best-known businessman of Kirveskoski was Aleksi Nyman, also known as "the Emperor of Rectified spirit", who became rich by smuggling illegal alcohol from Estonia when the Finnish prohibition law began in 1919. He even got caught with other smugglers and was imprisoned. At the end of the prohibition law in 1932, Nyman lived in Kirveskoski and began practicing as a butcher.

== See also ==
- Mäntsälä (village)
- Numminen, Mäntsälä
