= Pornainen Church =

- Finnish: Pornaisten kirkko Swedish: Borgnäs kyrka
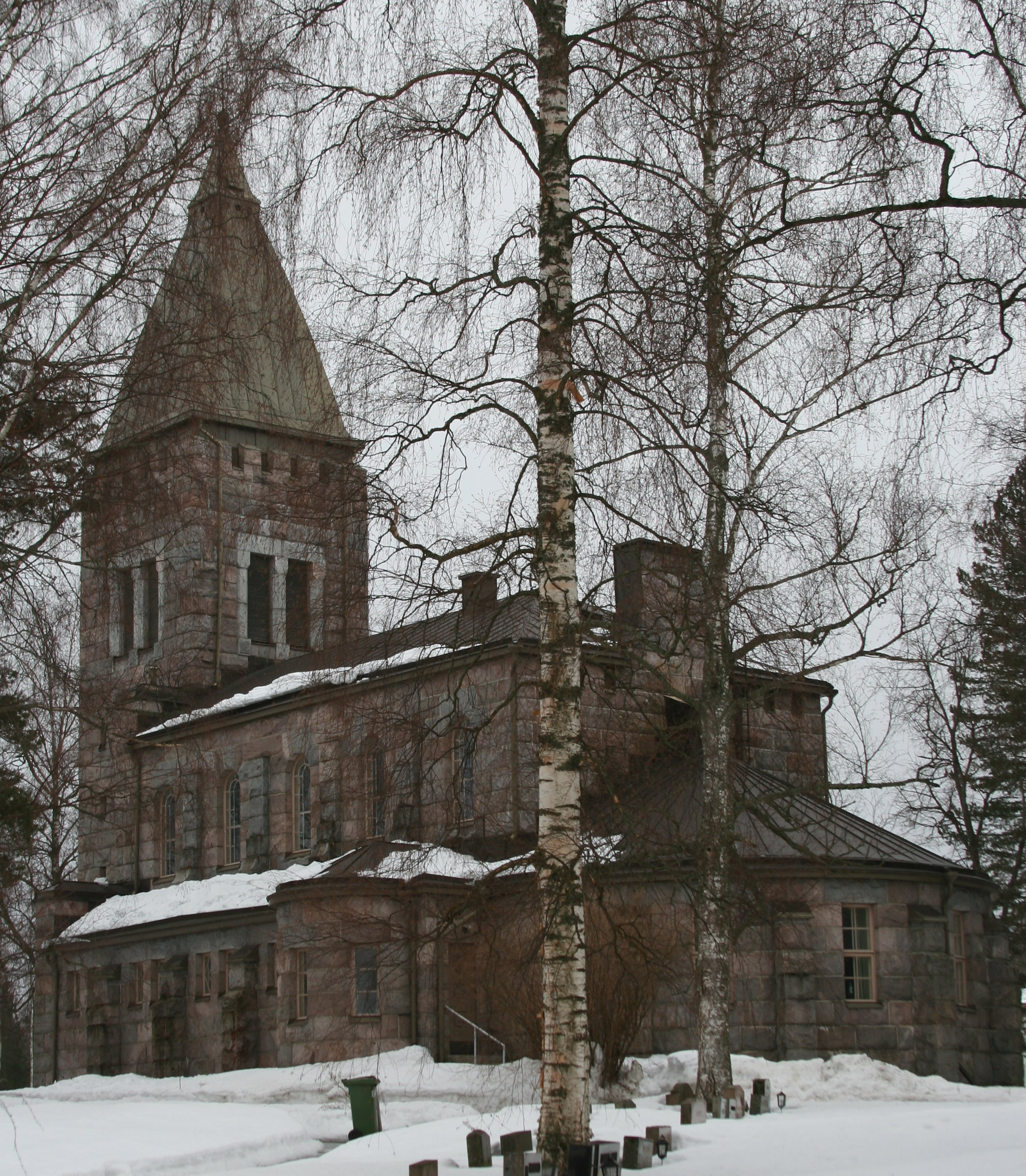
- Pornainen Church
- 60°28′27″N 025°22′33″E
- Location: Kirveskoski, Pornainen
- Country: Finland
- Website: www.pornaistenseurakunta.fi

Architecture
- Architect: Ilmari Launis
- Completed: 5 October 1924; 101 years ago

Specifications
- Capacity: 250

Administration
- Diocese: Helsinki
- Parish: Pornainen

The Pornainen Church (Finnish: Pornaisten kirkko; Swedish: Borgnäs kyrka) is the 20th-century granite church located in the Pornainen municipality in Uusimaa, Finland. The building was designed by Ilmari Launis, and it was completed in 1924.

The church's 12-tone pipe organ was manufactured by the Kangasala's organ factory in 1977.
