= Urban areas in Finland =

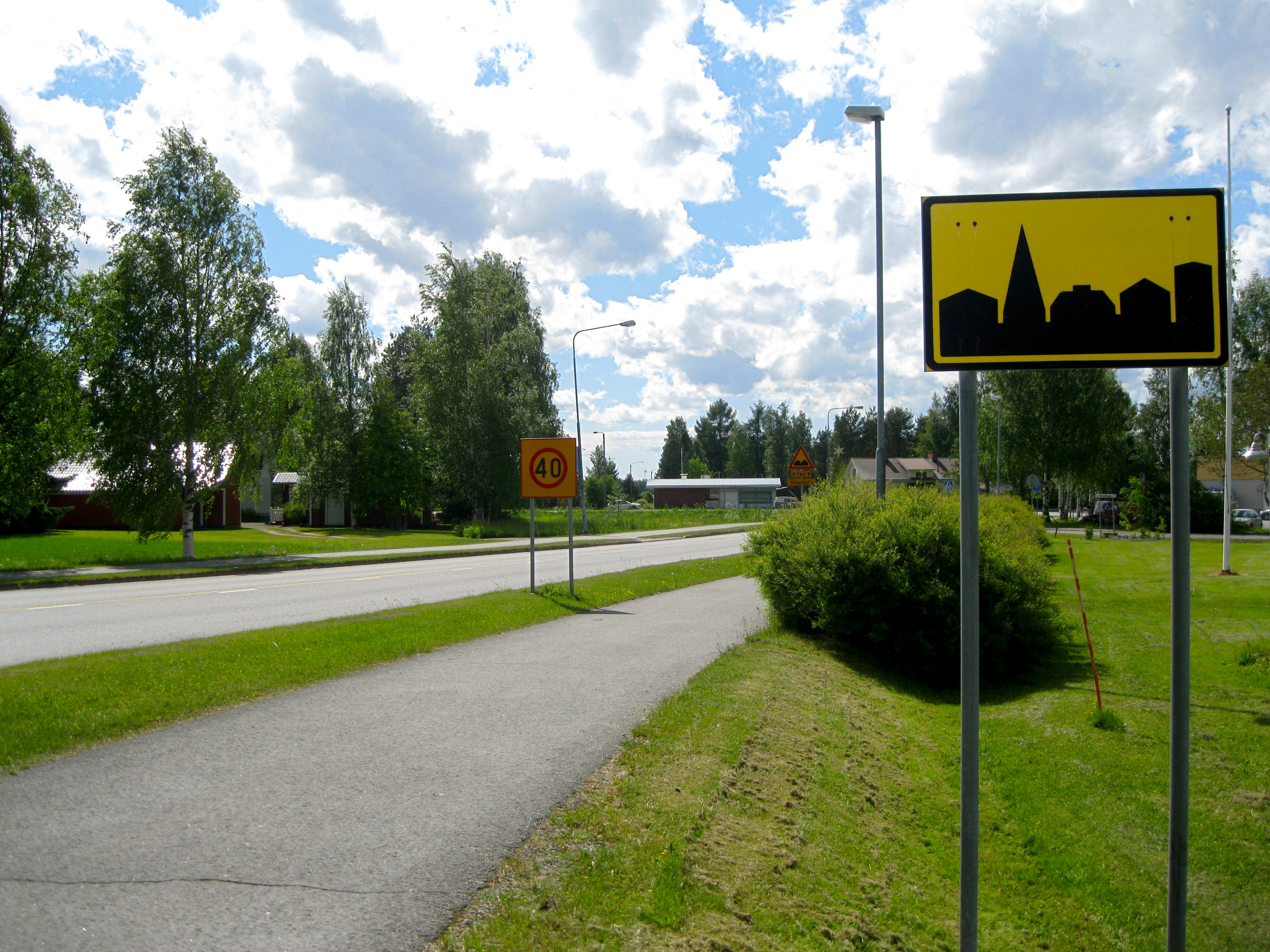
A street sign indicating the beginning of an urban area

Finnish road signs indicating the start and end of an urban area

In Finland, an urban area or statistical locality (Finnish: taajama, Swedish: tätort) is defined as a cluster of dwellings with at least 200 inhabitants. It may be a city, town or larger village and is a purely statistical concept, not defined by municipal or regional boundaries.

The largest urban area in Finland is the Helsinki urban area with over 1.3 million inhabitants in 2019. It extends across Helsinki as well as ten other municipalities in the Helsinki metropolitan area. The second largest is the Tampere urban area with about 342,000 inhabitants in 2019, and the third largest is the Turku urban area with about 278,000 inhabitants in 2019.

The presence of urban areas is used to regulate traffic, with a default of 50 kilometres per hour (31 mph) speed limit inside an urban area and 80 kilometres per hour (50 mph) outside. Each major road leading in or out of an urban area is marked with a road sign.

== List ==
Listed are the 100 largest localities or urban areas in Finland on 31 December 2019. The list is based on data from Statistics Finland that defines an urban area as a cluster of dwellings with at least 200 inhabitants.

Map of Finnish urban areas with over 20,000 inhabitants. Marker sizes are proportional to population brackets (2019 data).

List of urban areas in Finland by population, 2019
Rank	Urban area	Population	Area (km^{2})	Density (pop. per km^{2})
1	Helsinki	1,305,893	682.91	1,912.2
2	Tampere	341,696	279.37	1,223.1
3	Turku	277,677	283.27	980.3
4	Oulu	205,137	203.25	1,009.3
5	Jyväskylä	128,911	111.22	1,159.1
6	Lahti	119,469	116.32	1,027.1
7	Kuopio	91,243	53.20	1,715.1
8	Pori	83,479	120.42	693.2
9	Joensuu	72,621	80.82	898.6
10	Vaasa	67,789	69.73	972.2
11	Lappeenranta	56,075	55.12	1,017.3
12	Rovaniemi	53,604	60.08	892.2
13	Seinäjoki	51,300	56.45	908.8
14	Hämeenlinna	50,975	49.19	1,036.3
15	Porvoo	50,610	48.04	806.5
16	Kotka	50,400	70.94	710.5
17	Kouvola	47,391	61.21	774.2
18	Hyvinkää	43,262	36.94	1,171.1
19	Mikkeli	37,218	42.99	865.7
20	Kokkola	36,887	49.55	744.4
21	Rauma	33,380	53.78	620.7
22	Lohja	32,603	46.01	708.6
23	Kajaani	29,582	28.62	1,033.6
24	Salo	28,680	37.46	765.6
25	Riihimäki	27,785	31.46	883.2
26	Imatra	27,338	56.29	485.7
27	Kemi	26,176	50.04	523.1
28	Forssa	21,008	38.65	543.5
29	Jakobstad	20,691	28.00	739.0
30	Savonlinna	20,681	22.95	901.1
31	Kirkkonummi	20,181	39.45	511.6
32	Raahe	18,891	42.31	446.5
33	Varkaus	18,616	31.55	590.0
34	Valkeakoski	16,960	20.25	837.5
35	Tornio	16,655	36.18	460.3
36	Hamina	15,380	34.85	441.3
37	Iisalmi	15,223	18.32	830.9
38	Mariehamn	14,631	21.35	685.3
39	Nummela	14,472	19.56	739.9
40	Heinola	14,231	16.58	858.3
41	Ilmajoki—Kurikka	13,411	57.42	233.6
42	Pieksämäki	12,895	19.12	674.4
43	Ylivieska	12,431	28.19	441.0
44	Jämsä	12,265	31.25	392.5
45	Nastola	11,688	23.93	488.4
46	Mäntsälä	11,548	17.69	652.8
47	Siilinjärvi	11,387	23.18	491.2
48	Lapua	10,775	29.13	369.9
49	Uusikaupunki	10,221	19.24	531.2
50	Vammala	10,057	20.59	488.4
51	Söderkulla	9,421	39.15	240.6
52	Pargas	9,389	27.10	346.5
53	Orimattila	9,039	17.25	524.0
54	Loimaa	8,753	17.54	499.0
55	Ekenäs	8,583	12.53	685.0
56	Kauhajoki	8,528	32.97	258.7
57	Äänekoski	8,477	10.72	790.8
58	Paimio	8,467	17.34	488.3
59	Toijala	8,365	16.43	509.1
60	Kuusamo	8,285	16.34	507.0
61	Laukaa	8,225	19.40	424.0
62	Karis	7,811	14.12	553.2
63	Kankaanpää	7,787	16.05	485.2
64	Nurmijärvi	7,576	11.27	672.2
65	Turenki	7,466	13.80	541.0
66	Mänttä	7,438	18.93	392.9
67	Karkkila	7,365	15.87	464.1
68	Hanko	7,329	13.61	538.5
69	Rajamäki	7,169	15.07	475.7
70	Muurame	7,115	12.91	551.1
71	Muhos	7,072	25.45	277.9
72	Loviisa	6,955	12.71	547.2
73	Lieksa	6,874	15.38	446.9
74	Joutseno	6,766	16.19	417.9
75	Kyröskoski	6,750	16.30	414.1
76	Parola	6,662	16.98	392.3
77	Lauttakylä	6,613	22.17	298.3
78	Laihia	6,598	23.24	283.9
79	Kalajoki	6,548	22.80	287.2
80	Iin Hamina	6,506	21.35	304.7
81	Jokela	6,471	10.89	594.2
82	Eura	6,327	21.71	291.4
83	Orivesi	6,239	14.75	423.0
84	Veikkola	6,214	18.01	345.0
85	Kyläsaari—Pihlava	6,207	18.78	330.5
86	Vuokatti	6,181	13.71	450.8
87	Keuruu	5,953	9.11	653.5
88	Valkeala	5,863	10.87	539.4
89	Myllykoski	5,714	16.07	355.6
90	Kiiminki	5,617	15.55	361.2
91	Laitila	5,596	16.89	331.3
92	Toivala—Vuorela	5,594	10.50	532.8
93	Kauhava	5,451	21.43	254.4
94	Vuores	5,355	3.03	1,767.3
95	Nivala	5,267	17.83	295.4
96	Oulainen	5,206	14.27	364.8
97	Kuhmo	5,200	9.05	574.6
98	Liminka	5,190	11.12	466.7
99	Viiala	5,087	11.47	443.5
100	Suonenjoki	5,070	12.23	414.6

== See also ==
- List of cities and towns in Finland
- Urban areas in the Nordic countries
- Dispersed settlement
