= Urban areas in Sweden =

Areas in Sweden with a minimum of 200 inhabitants

An urban area or tätort (lit. 'dense locality') in Sweden has a minimum of 200 inhabitants and may be a city, town or larger village. It is a purely statistical concept, not defined by any municipal or county boundaries. Larger urban areas synonymous with cities or towns (Swedish: stad for both terms) for statistical purposes have a minimum of 10,000 inhabitants. The same statistical definition is also used for urban areas in the other Nordic countries.

In 2018, there were nearly two thousand urban areas in Sweden, which were inhabited by 87% of the Swedish population.

Urban area is a common English translation of the Swedish term tätort. The official term in English used by Statistics Sweden is, however, "locality" (Swedish: ort). It could be compared with "census-designated places" in the United States.

== History ==
Until the beginning of the 20th century, only the towns/cities were regarded as urban areas. The built-up area and the municipal entity were normally almost congruent. Urbanization and industrialization created, however, many new settlements without formal city status. New suburbs grew up just outside city limits, being de facto urban but de jure rural. This created a statistical problem. The census of 1910 introduced the concept of "densely populated localities in the countryside". The term tätort (literally "dense place") was introduced in 1930. The municipal amalgamations placed more and more rural areas within city municipalities, which was the other side of the same problem. The administrative boundaries were in fact not suitable for defining rural and urban populations. From 1950 rural and urban areas had to be separated even within city limits, as, e.g., the huge wilderness around Kiruna had been declared a "city" in 1948. From 1965 only "non-administrative localities" are counted, independently of municipal and county borders. In 1971 "city" was abolished as a type of municipality.

== Terminology ==
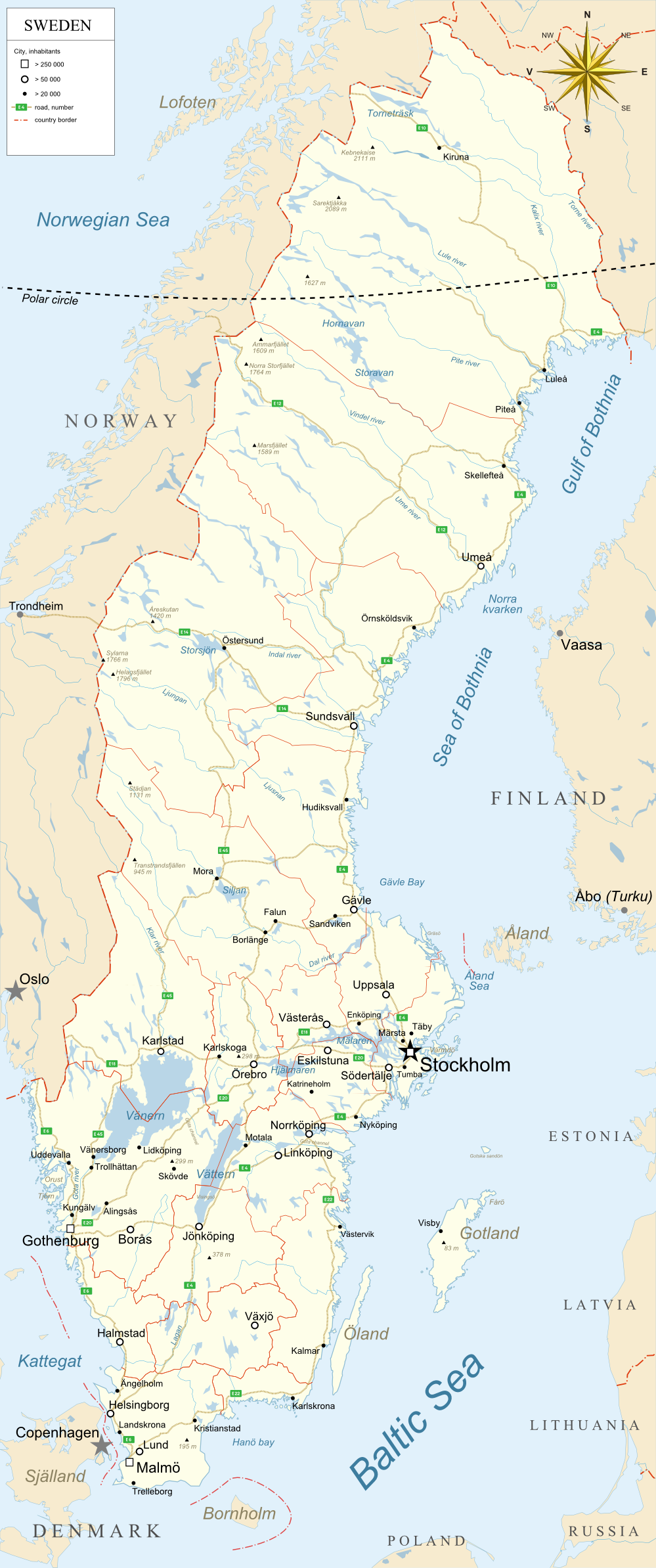
Map of Sweden showing all urban areas (cities and towns) with a population of more than 20,000 (Mora is not correct; Varberg and Falkenberg missing).

Urban areas in the meaning of tätort are defined independently on the division into counties and municipalities, and are defined solely according to population density. In practice, most references in Sweden are to municipalities, not specifically to towns or cities, which complicates international comparisons. Most municipalities contain many localities (up to 26 in Kristianstad Municipality), but some localities are, on the other hand, multimunicipal. Stockholm urban area is spread over 11 municipalities.

When comparing the population of different cities, the urban area (tätort) population is preferred to the population of the municipality. The population of, e.g., Stockholm should be accounted as about 1.6 million rather than the approximately 990,000 of the municipality, and Lund rather about 94,000 than about 130,000.

== Swedish definitions ==
=== Terms used for statistical purposes ===
- Tätort (English: urban area, or locality) is the central concept used in statistics. The definition is agreed upon in the Nordic countries: An urban area is any village, town or city with a population of at least 200, for which the contiguous built-up area meet the criterion that houses are not more than 200 meters apart when discounting rivers, parks, roads, etc. – without regard to the ward, municipal or county boundaries. Delimitation of localities are made by Statistics Sweden every three years starting 2015 on a trial basis, previously they were made every five years.
- Småort (English: smaller locality) is a rural locality with 50–199 inhabitants in a contiguous built-up area with no more than 150 meters between houses. The concept is rarely used outside the field of statistics, where it is used for settlements just below the limit defined for tätort.
- Centralort (English: central locality) is mostly used in the meaning municipal seat or municipal center of service, commerce and administration for an area.

=== Popular and traditional terms ===
- Storstad (English: metropolitan area, literally "large city") is a term usually reserved for Sweden's three largest cities: Stockholm, Gothenburg and Malmö. Statistics Sweden uses the term metropolitan area (Swedish: storstadsområde) for these three cities and their immediate surroundings and municipalities.
- Stad (English: town or city) is the term avoided by Statistics Sweden, however, it roughly corresponds to urban areas with a population greater than 10,000. Judicially, the term stad has been obsolete since 1971, and is now mostly used describing localities which used to be chartered towns. The statistical category "large town" used by Statistics Sweden include municipalities with more than 90,000 inhabitants within a 30 km radius from the municipality centre. There is also a category medelstor stad "middle large town".
- Köping (English: market town) was also abolished as an official term in 1971 in governmental and statistical contexts, and is only rarely kept in use by laypeople, although it has survived as part of the names of several towns. The meaning was a locality with an intermediary legal status below that of a town.
- Municipalsamhälle (English: municipal community) was a term in use between 1875 and 1971, but it is no longer used outside of historical contexts. In 1863, Sweden was divided into 2,500 municipalities, whereof 89 were towns, 8 were market towns (köpingar) and the rest rural municipalities ("landskommuner"). A "municipalsamhälle" was an administrative centre for one or several rural municipalities, with special regulations and privileges in common with towns. The term became obsolete in 1971 when the different types of municipalities were abandoned and a standard form for all municipalities was introduced.
- Samhälle (English: community) is a common concept used by for urban areas that are intermediary in size between a town and a village. The term "samhälle" is also used in Swedish to denote "society", "community" or "state". (Compare: Gemeinschaft and Gesellschaft.) A samhälle does not necessarily meet the criteria for the current tätort – or even småort concept.
- By (English: village and hamlet) is a traditional term but may in colloquial use refer to a suburb or town of considerable size. If at all used in the context of statistics, it must be assumed that the size of a by is smaller than that of a småort. This is not to be confused with the same word in Danish and Norwegian, where it means town, while a village is called landsby.

=== Seasonal areas and suburbs ===
- Fritidshusområde (English: seasonal area) is in statistical context an area with less than 50 permanent inhabitants but at least 50 houses (in practice: weekend cottages/summer houses) meeting the criterion that they are not more than 150 metres apart. About a third of Sweden's "second homes" are located in such areas. The term belongs also to everyday usage, although less strictly defined.
- Förstad and förort (English: suburb) are much used terms with a somewhat negative connotation.

== Statistics ==
Before 2015 delimitation of localities were made by Statistics Sweden every five years, since then it is trialling a three-year update period. The number of urban areas in Sweden increased by 56 to 1,956 in 2010. A total of 8,016,000 – 85 per cent – of the Swedish population lived in an urban area; occupying only 1,3 per cent of Sweden's total land area, and the most populous urban area is Stockholm at 1,4 million people.

There are over 2,000 urban areas in Sweden as defined by Statistics Sweden on 31 December 2023. The official term used by Statistics Sweden is "locality" (Swedish: tätort) instead of "urban area" and they are defined as having a minimum of 200 inhabitants.

As of December 2023, there are 125 localities with at least ten thousand inhabitants:

Urban area (locality)	Population (2023)	Land area (km^{2})
Stockholm	1,652,895	435.08
Gothenburg	674,529	271.55
Malmö	339,316	80.67
Uppsala	174,982	45.79
Upplands Väsby	156,517	47.63
Västerås	131,643	52.34
Örebro	128,658	55.75
Linköping	116,851	39.67
Helsingborg	116,029	41.71
Jönköping	103,032	49.81
Lund	98,308	27.6
Norrköping	98,229	38.51
Umeå	94,243	36.32
Gävle	86,533	54.97
Södertälje	78,337	29.37
Borås	75,565	32.11
Växjö	74,052	38.23
Halmstad	72,979	38.89
Sundsvall	70,918	53.28
Eskilstuna	70,646	29.87
Karlstad	69,615	31.44
Östersund	53,992	39.36
Trollhättan	50,069	27.78
Luleå	49,646	30.0
Northeast Gothenburg	48,217	11.7
Tumba	46,893	22.44
Lidingö	44,642	17.69
Borlänge	44,299	37.22
Kalmar	42,622	20.47
Kristianstad	41,198	22.44
Skövde	40,422	23.94
Falun	39,939	27.43
Nyköping	39,770	19.2
Skellefteå	39,146	26.41
Varberg	38,575	24.92
Åkersberga	37,714	25.17
Karlskrona	36,423	22.03
Uddevalla	35,639	20.34
Vallentuna	33,918	18.17
Landskrona	33,859	15.16
Örnsköldsvik	33,399	41.01
Västerhaninge	31,941	16.49
Motala	31,367	20.56
Trelleborg	31,366	16.95
Ängelholm	31,089	22.66
Märsta	30,576	6.95
Falkenberg	29,671	25.89
Kungälv	28,912	17.79
Lerum	28,789	25.73
Alingsås	27,895	14.41
Karlskoga	27,261	20.43
Enköping	26,353	12.46
Visby	26,305	16.87
Mölnlycke	25,172	15.17
Gustavsberg	25,034	15.13
Sandviken	24,827	17.44
Vänersborg	24,731	12.49
Katrineholm	23,953	12.33
Piteå	23,824	24.36
Norrtälje	23,606	11.34
Lidköping	23,585	13.52
Västervik	21,615	15.1
Ystad	21,259	12.47
Eslöv	20,422	9.86
Värnamo	20,273	12.45
Karlshamn	19,966	16.51
Hässleholm	19,760	14.1
Oskarshamn	18,817	15.55
Nässjö	18,639	12.87
Köping	18,605	10.59
Kristinehamn	18,358	15.56
Härnösand	18,236	12.55
Falköping	17,924	10.46
Kumla	17,889	12.03
Staffanstorp	17,838	9.6
Kiruna	17,284	11.39
Kungsängen	16,899	8.14
Hudiksvall	16,792	14.2
Mariestad	16,750	12.81
Boden	16,644	15.2
Nynäshamn	16,447	7.55
Höganäs	16,274	11.12
Bålsta	16,205	12.38
Ljungby	16,076	13.52
Avesta	16,055	15.34
Ludvika	15,675	11.42
Höllviken	15,669	13.12
Kinna	15,507	19.3
Bunkeflostrand	15,488	5.05
Strängnäs	15,369	8.45
Tranås	14,611	11.25
Skoghall	14,610	12.84
Stenungsund	14,381	13.42
Mjölby	14,282	9.48
Arvika	14,186	12.33
Oxie	14,040	5.76
Höör	14,004	19.39
Bollnäs	13,918	14.83
Vetlanda	13,895	11.57
Sala	13,702	11.72
Lomma	13,699	6.11
Nybro	13,584	11.95
Svedala	13,433	8.46
Finspång	13,186	8.26
Mora	12,830	18.21
Ronneby	12,636	8.33
Onsala	12,486	14.43
Gällivare	12,385	10.53
Ekerö	12,270	6.35
Söderhamn	12,038	9.38
Ulricehamn	11,794	7.85
Fagersta	11,771	8.84
Nödinge-Nol	11,658	8.87
Oxelösund	11,485	12.34
Skara	11,475	8.4
Bjuv	11,209	9.86
Eksjö	11,077	9.67
Älmhult	11,053	10.49
Arboga	10,906	8.08
Åhus	10,877	12.28
Kävlinge	10,453	4.94
Sigtuna	10,407	5.6
Hallstahammar	10,147	6.62
Åstorp	10,063	7.12
Gislaved	10,029	7.07

== See also ==
- Urban areas in the Nordic countries
  - List of urban areas in the Nordic countries
- List of cities in Sweden
- List of metropolitan areas in Sweden
- List of municipalities of Sweden
- Largest urban areas of the European Union
- Geography of Sweden
