= Mäntsälä (village) =

Mäntsälän kirkonkylä
- Municipal center
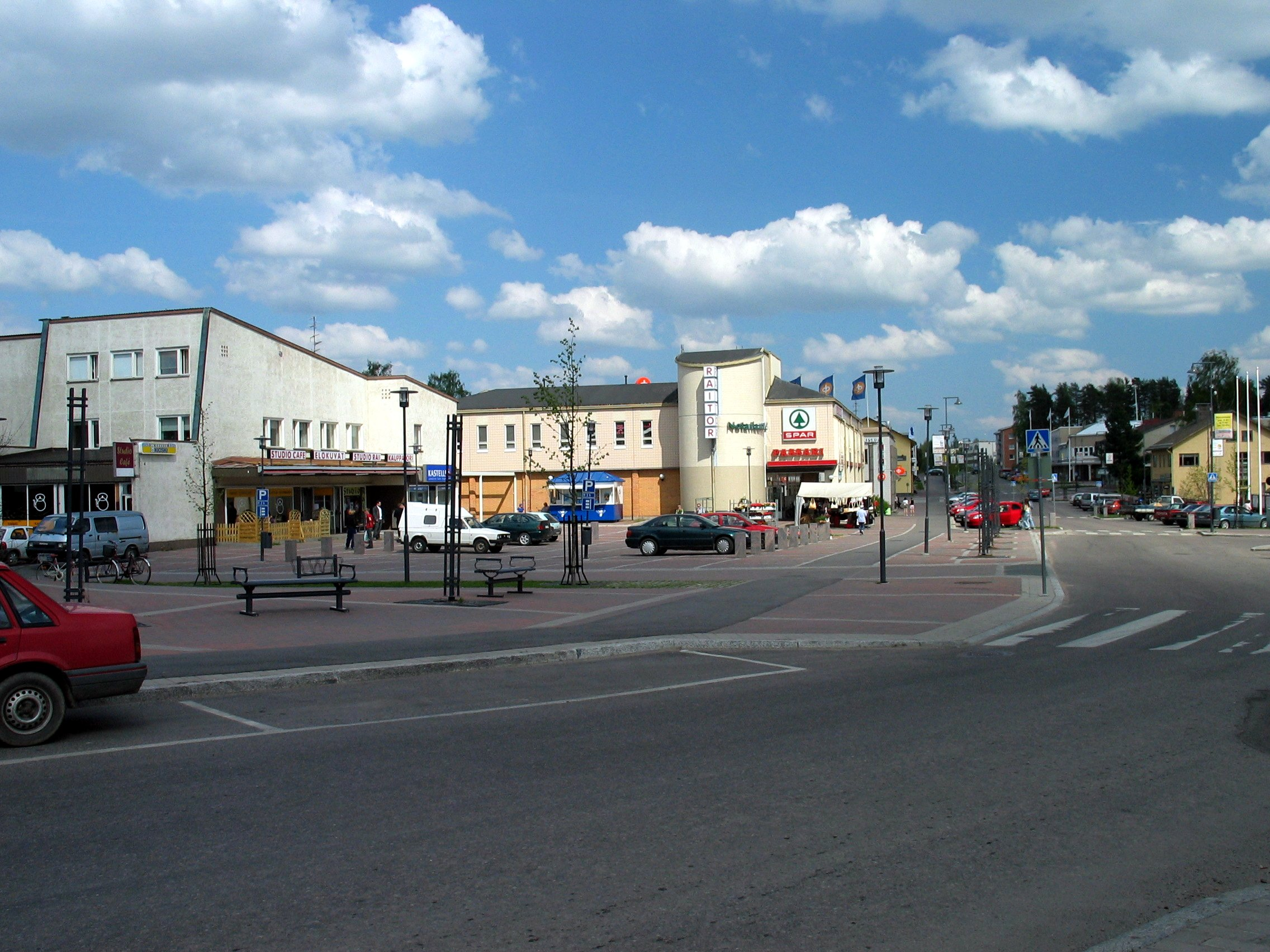
- Market square along the main street of Mäntsälä.

- Location in Finland
- Coordinates: 60°38′00″N 25°18′50″E
- Country: Finland
- Region: Uusimaa
- Municipality: Mäntsälä

Area
  - Total: 17.69 km^{2} (6.83 sq mi)
- Elevation: 73 m (240 ft)

Population (31 December 2019)
  - Total: 11,548
  - Density: 6,528/km^{2} (16,910/sq mi)
- Time zone: UTC+2 (EET)
  - Summer (DST): UTC+3 (EEST)
- Postal code: 04600

Mäntsälän kirkonkylä (lit. 'Mäntsälä church village') is the largest urban area and the municipal center of Mäntsälä in Uusimaa, Finland, with about 11,000 inhabitants. It is located 24 kilometres (15 mi) from Järvenpää, 28 kilometres (17 mi) from Hyvinkää, 38 kilometres (24 mi) from Porvoo and 43 kilometres (27 mi) from Lahti. The Mäntsälänjoki River flows through the area and joins the Mustijoki River further south, which runs all the way to the Gulf of Finland.

== Etymology ==
The village name Mäntsälä appears in early written material in the form Mensela, Menselä, Mensilä (1458), Mensse (1516), Mentzeby (1540). The village name has evolved from the house name, which probably includes the early host's first name Mäntsä (or Mänssä). It has been interpreted as an abbreviation of the given name Clement. According to Viljo Nissilä, a possible starting point may have been the male name Menze (or Mensse), found in the Friesland area.

== Services ==
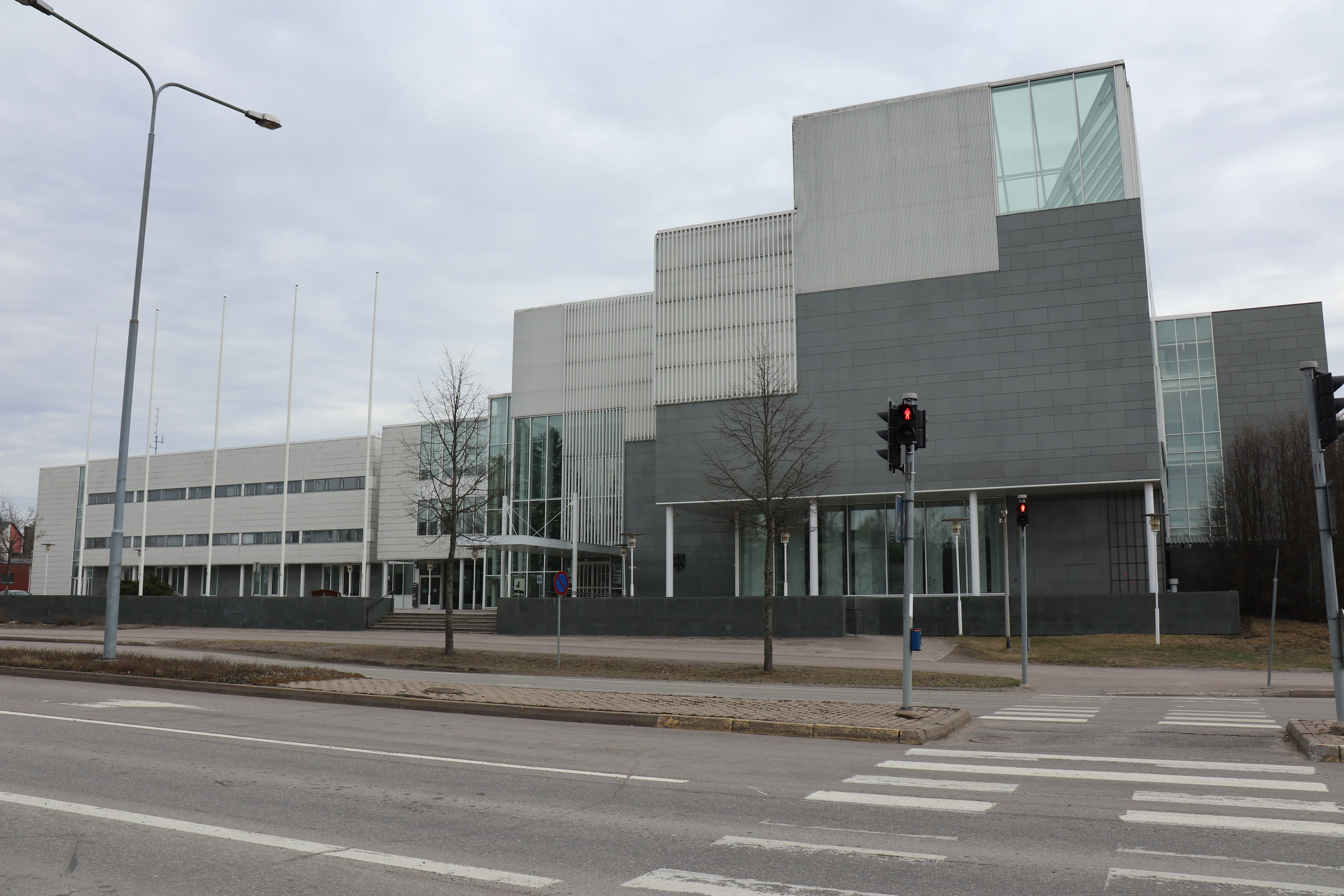
Mäntsälä town hall

The municipal center houses the Mäntsälä town hall, the Mäntsälä Church completed in 1865, the Mäntsälä health center, several educational institutions, the Mäntsälä multipurpose house and the Mäntsälä railway station. Mäntsälä bus station is one of the busiest stations in rural Finland. Many Mäntsälä residents work in other locations, and bus traffic has long played a significant role in Mäntsälä. The current bus station was completed in 1962.

There are three grocery stores in the municipal center: K-Citymarket, S-market and Lidl.

== Transport ==
The municipal center is located in the middle of the municipality at the intersection of major roads, Highways 4 (E75) and Highway 25, and Main Road 55 in the direction of Porvoo. The current Highway 4 runs as a motorway past the church village, but the old road between Helsinki and Lahti, the current regional road 140, runs directly through it and serves as the main street in the urban area. Next to the motorway is the Kerava–Lahti railway line, which was opened in 2006. The Mäntsälä railway station is located near the municipal center.

== See also ==
- Kirveskoski
- Monninkylä
- Numminen, Mäntsälä
- Sälinkää
