= Ilmari Launis =

Finnish architect (1881–1955)

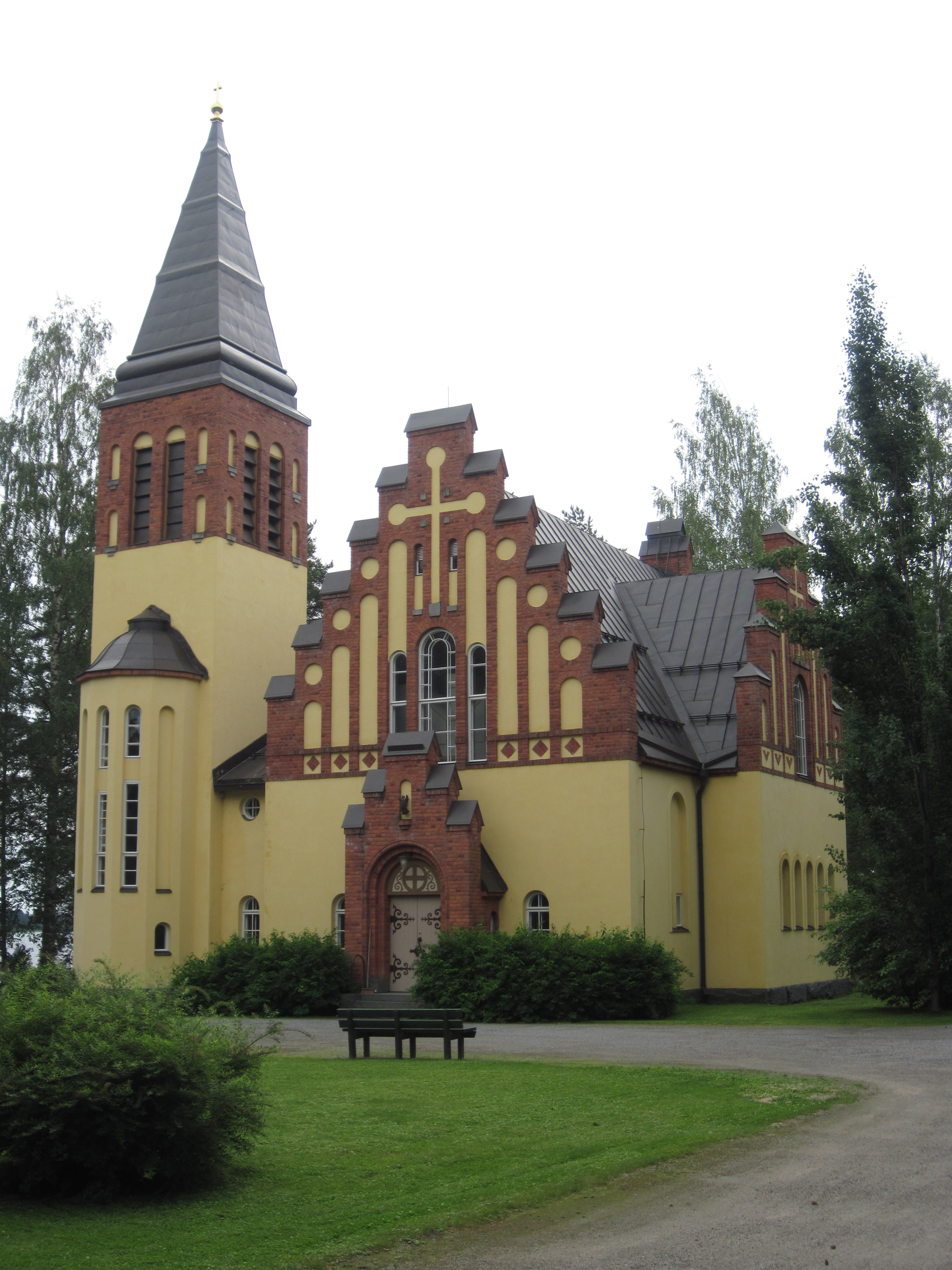
Tervo Church, by Ilmari Launis

Adolf Ilmari Launis (before 1900 Lindberg; 3 December 1881, Hämeenlinna – 10 April 1955, Helsinki) was a Finnish architect.

Ilmari Launis graduated as an architect in 1905 and worked for a government agency overseeing the construction of public buildings between 1905 and 1937. In this capacity he was responsible for the design of several churches, parsonages, parish houses and burial chapels in Finland. Apart from providing the overall design, he on several occasions also painted altarpieces and designed stained glass windows and other details of the churches himself. He also worked for a period as City Architect of Kuopio.

Churches designed by Ilmari Launis include those in Valkjärvi (1919), Vieremä (1919), Kalvola (1919–1921), Pomarkku (1921), Pirkkala Old Church (1921), Konnevesi (1923), Pornainen (1924), Sammaljoki (1924), Tervo (1925), Huhtamo (1928), Vuoksela (1928–1929), Ylämaa (1931), Saari (1933–1934), Lumivaara (1934–1935) and Paltamo (1946).

His brother Armas Launis was also an architect.
