= Mäntsälä Airfield =

Mäntsälä Airfield Mäntsälän lentokenttä
- IATA: none; ICAO: EFMN

Summary
- Airport type: Private
- Location: Mäntsälä, Finland
- Elevation AMSL: 135 ft / 41 m
- Coordinates: 60°34′21″N 025°30′32″E

Map
- Location within Finland

Runways
Direction	Length		Surface
Direction	m	ft	Surface
04/22	400	1,312	Grass
- Source: VFR Finland

Mäntsälä Airfield is an airfield in Mäntsälä, Finland, about 7 nautical miles (13 km; 8 mi) southeast of Mäntsälä town centre.

== See also ==
- List of airports in Finland
