= Numminen, Mäntsälä =

Village in Uusimaa, Finland

Numminen
- Village
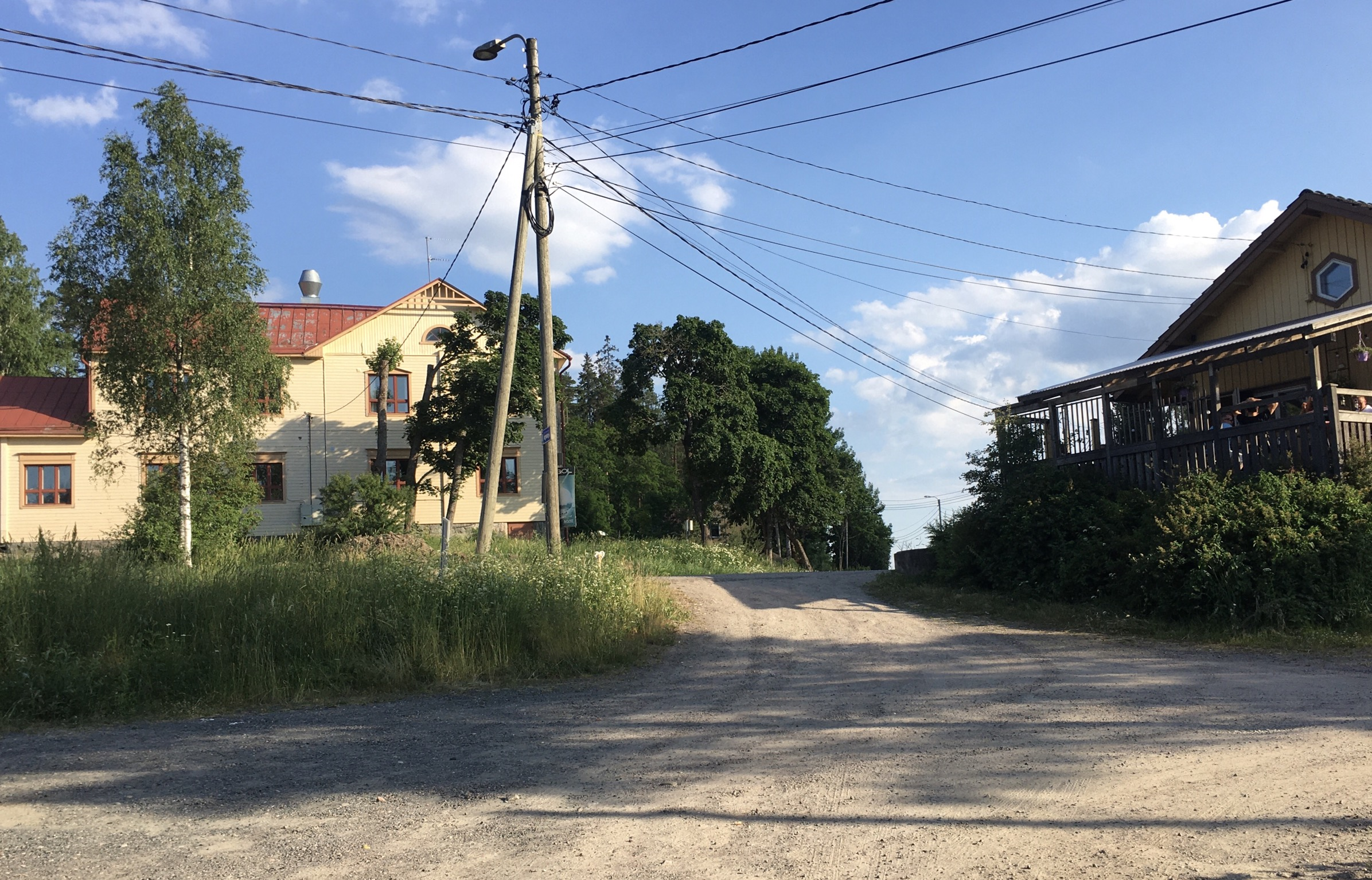
- The village center of Numminen.

- Location in Finland
- Coordinates: 60°33′35″N 25°17′00″E
- Country: Finland
- Region: Uusimaa
- Municipality: Mäntsälä

Area
  - Total: 4.02 km^{2} (1.55 sq mi)

Population (31 December 2020)
  - Total: 329
  - Density: 818/km^{2} (2,120/sq mi)
- Time zone: UTC+2 (EET)
  - Summer (DST): UTC+3 (EEST)
- Postal code: 04660

Numminen is a village in the southern part of the Mäntsälä municipality near the border of Pornainen in Uusimaa, Finland. More than 300 inhabitants live in the village. It is located along the Mustijoki River, about 10 kilometres (6.2 mi) south of the Mäntsälä's municipal centre and about 12 kilometres (7.5 mi) northwest of Kirveskoski, the municipal centre of Pornainen.

There are three historic manors in the village: Nordbo (Ulriksdal), Ylikartano (Andersberg) and Alikartano (Frugård). Numminen has own primary school completed in 2013. The village includes the sports club Nummisten Vilkas and a hunting club.

In 2023 parliamentary elections 32.5% of inhabitants of Numminen voted for the Finns Party.

== Notable people ==
- Outi Pieski (born 1973), Sámi visual artist
- Adolf Erik Nordenskiöld (1832–1901), geologist and explorer

== See also ==
- Mäntsälä (village)
- Kirveskoski
- Järvenpää
