= Sälinkää =

Sälinkää Swedish: Sellinge
- Village
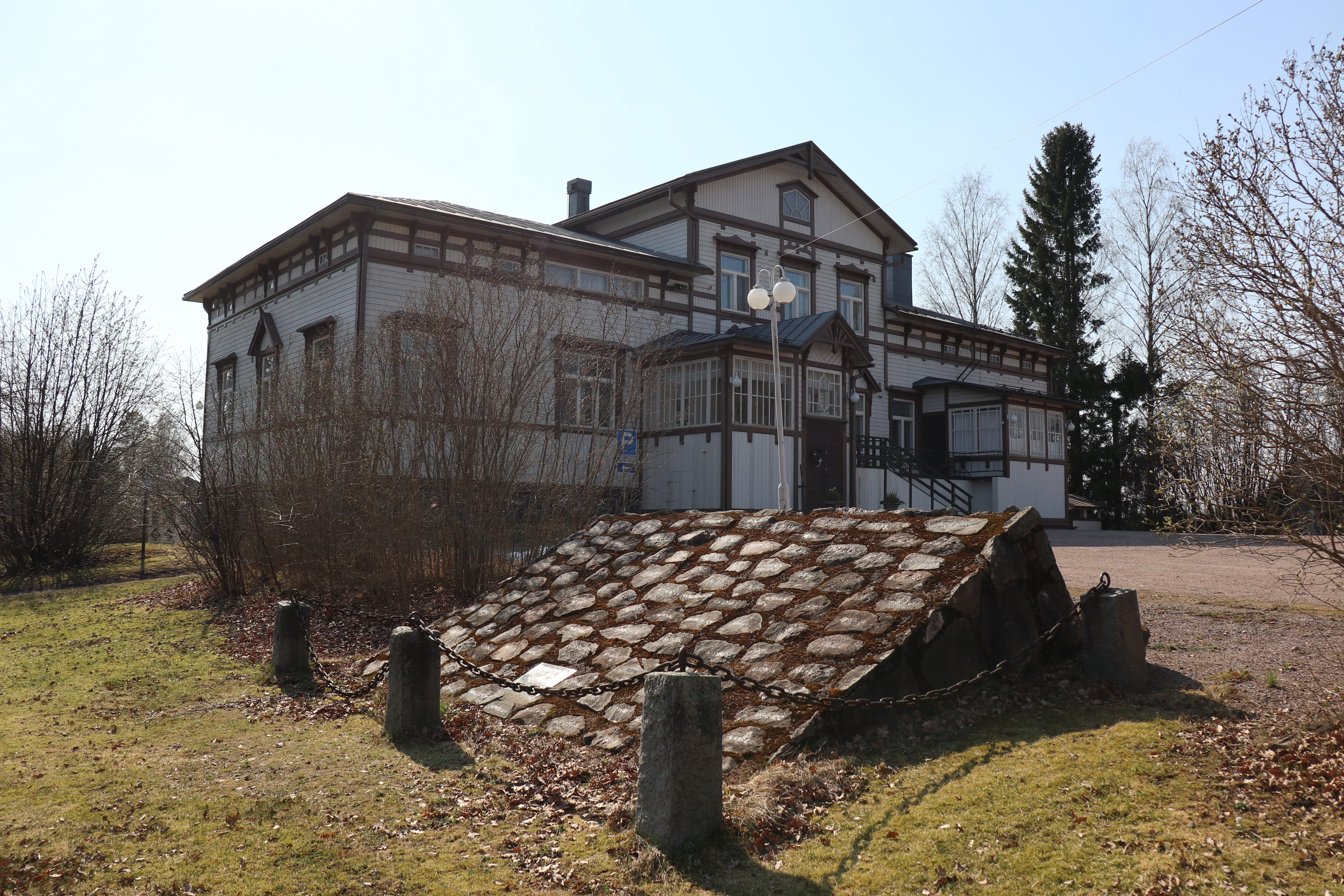
- The Sälinkää Manor

- Location in Finland
- Coordinates: 60°42′42″N 25°13′52″E
- Country: Finland
- Region: Uusimaa
- Municipality: Mäntsälä

Area
  - Total: 1.62 km^{2} (0.63 sq mi)

Population (31 December 2020)
  - Total: 242
  - Density: 1,494/km^{2} (3,870/sq mi)
- Time zone: UTC+2 (EET)
  - Summer (DST): UTC+3 (EEST)
- Postal code: 04740

Sälinkää (Finnish: [ˈsæliŋkæː]; Swedish: Sellinge, Finland Swedish: [ˈselːiŋe]) is a village in the Mäntsälä municipality in Uusimaa, Finland, with over 200 inhabitants. It is located 11 kilometres (6.8 mi) northwest of the Mäntsälä's municipal centre and 17 kilometres (11 mi) southeast of Oitti, the municipal centre of Hausjärvi. The north-south road 1471 from Hausjärvi to Mäntsälä passes through the village. Lake Kilpijärvi is located near Sälinkää.

The Sälinkää village has largely been built in the immediate vicinity of the historic Sälinkää Manor (Sälinkään kartano). Today, the manor operates as a reservation restaurant, where various events are organized. Other village services include two schools, Sälinkää School and Lukko School, one kindergarten, and a volunteer fire department. There was also a general store in the village before, which stopped operating in June 2022.

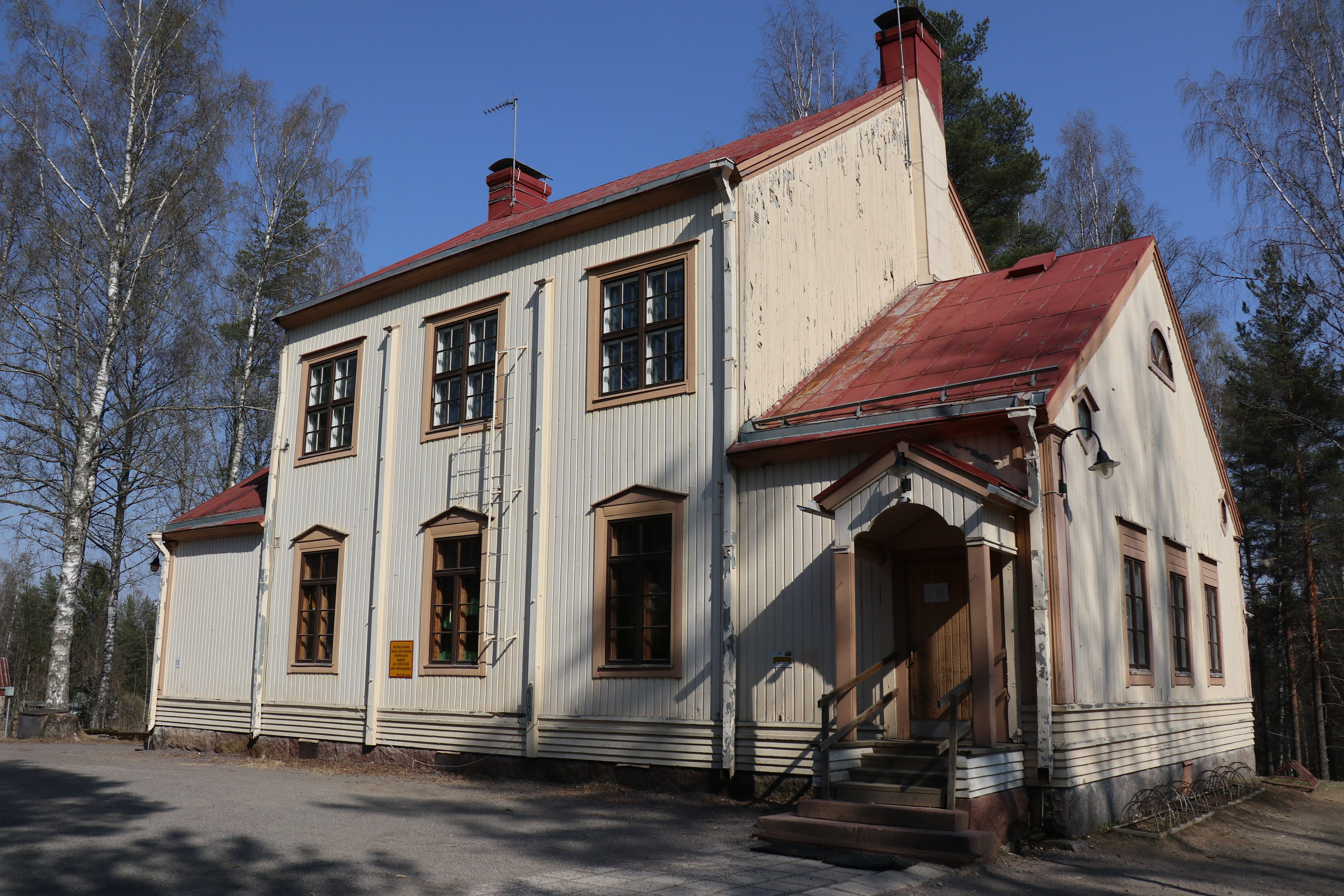
The Lukko School (Lukon koulu)

The provincial government of Uusimaa named Sälinkää the Uusimaa village of the year in 2008.

== See also ==
- Mäntsälä (village)
- Oitti
- Hyvinkää

== Sources ==
=== Further reading ===
- Kirsti Kivinen (2011). Torpista tietokoneille – Sälinkään kyläkirja 2011 (in Finnish). Kirjoittajaryhmä.
