= Seppo Aho =

Finnish modern pentathlete (born 1944)

Personal information
- Nationality: Finnish
- Born: 7 March 1944 (age 82) Pornainen, Finland
- Height: 174 cm (5 ft 9 in)
- Weight: 70 kg (154 lb)

Sport
- Sport: Modern pentathlon

Seppo Aho (born 7 March 1944) is a Finnish modern pentathlete. He competed at the 1968 Summer Olympics. At the 1968 Olympics he finished 18th in the individual event and 5th in the team event.
