= Huhtamo =

Huhtamo is a Finnish-language surname that may refer to:

- Kari Huhtamo (1943–2023), Finnish sculptor
- Markku Huhtamo (born 1946), Finnish actor
