= Tampere urban area =

Urban area in Finland

Tampere urban area (Finnish: Tampereen keskustaajama, Swedish: Tammerfors centraltätort) is the largest urban area (Finnish: taajama) in the Pirkanmaa region, and the second largest urban area in whole Finland after the Helsinki urban area. At the end of 2021 it had a population of 353 696 with a land area of 291,6 km², resulting in a population density of 1 213 inhabitants per km^{2} in the urban area.

== See also ==
- Helsinki urban area
- Tampere metropolitan area
- Tampere sub-region
