= Kari Huhtamo =

Finnish sculptor (1943–2023)

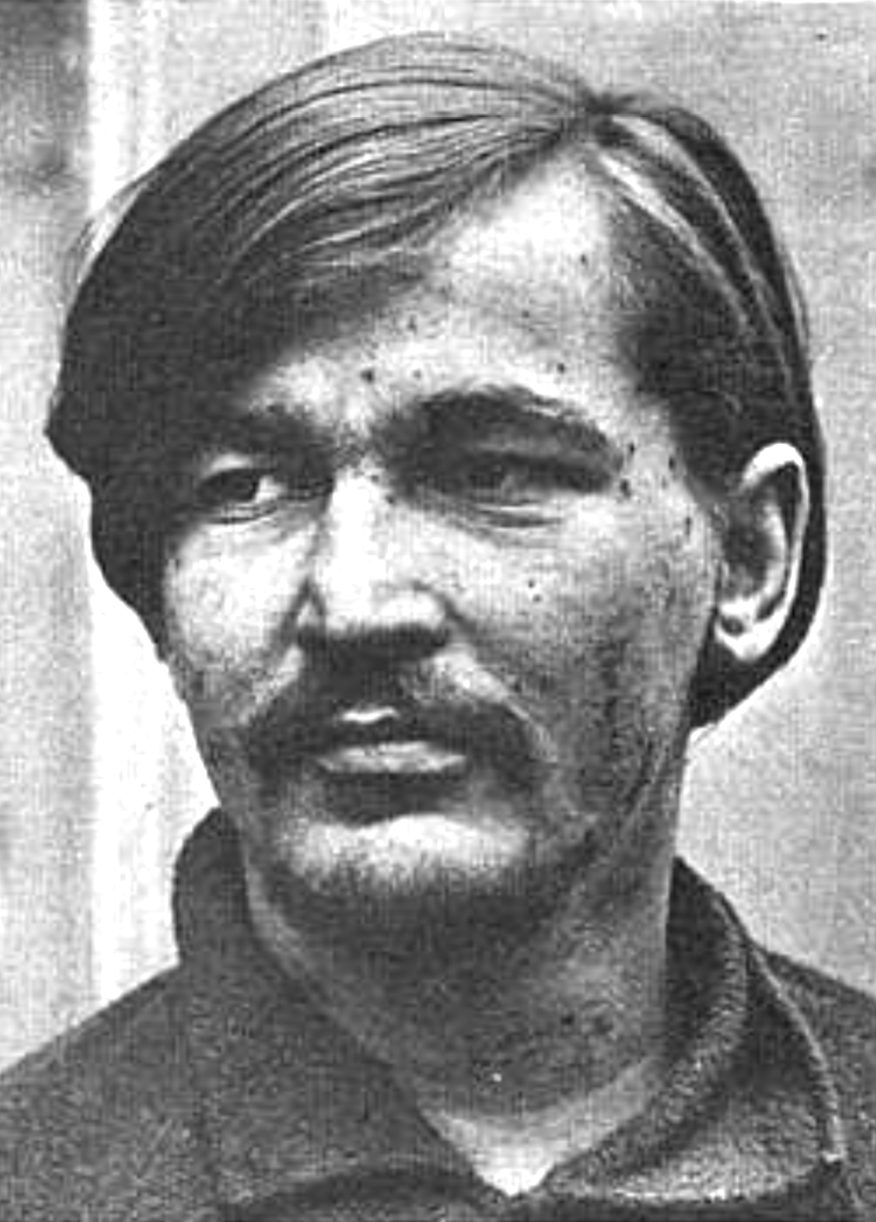
Kari Huhtamo

Kari Huhtamo (11 January 1943 – 1 March 2023) was a Finnish sculptor.

== Background ==
He was born in Rovaniemi, Finland. He studied at the School of Industrial Art and the School of the Finnish Art Academy 1961–1964 and lived and worked in Helsinki since 1961.

Although his main activity was making sculpture, Kari Huhtamo also made lithographs, silk screens and textile works, medals and portraits. In the early years of his career he used wood, light concrete and second-hand materials for his sculptures, and later aluminium, plastic and bronze. From the 1970s onwards his primary material had nevertheless been acid-proof stainless steel.

One of the first public sculptures by Kari Huhtamo is the Monument to the Reconstruction of Lapland in 1945–1955 in Rovaniemi, for which he received a commission in 1969. Since the mid- 1970s he has designed many public sculptures, received numerous commissions and has won prizes and awards in sculpture competitions.

Besides having been exhibited in Finland, his sculpture has been shown in Estonia, South Korea and in the Netherlands. In 2009 he was the first Finnish sculptor to have a one-man exhibition in the Tretyakov Gallery in Moscow, Russia. In 2010 he was the first sculptor to exhibit on the grounds of Kultaranta, the summer residence of the Finnish President in Naantali, Finland.
