= Pornainen =

Municipality in Uusimaa, Finland

Pornainen Borgnäs
- Municipality
- Pornaisten kunta Borgnäs kommun
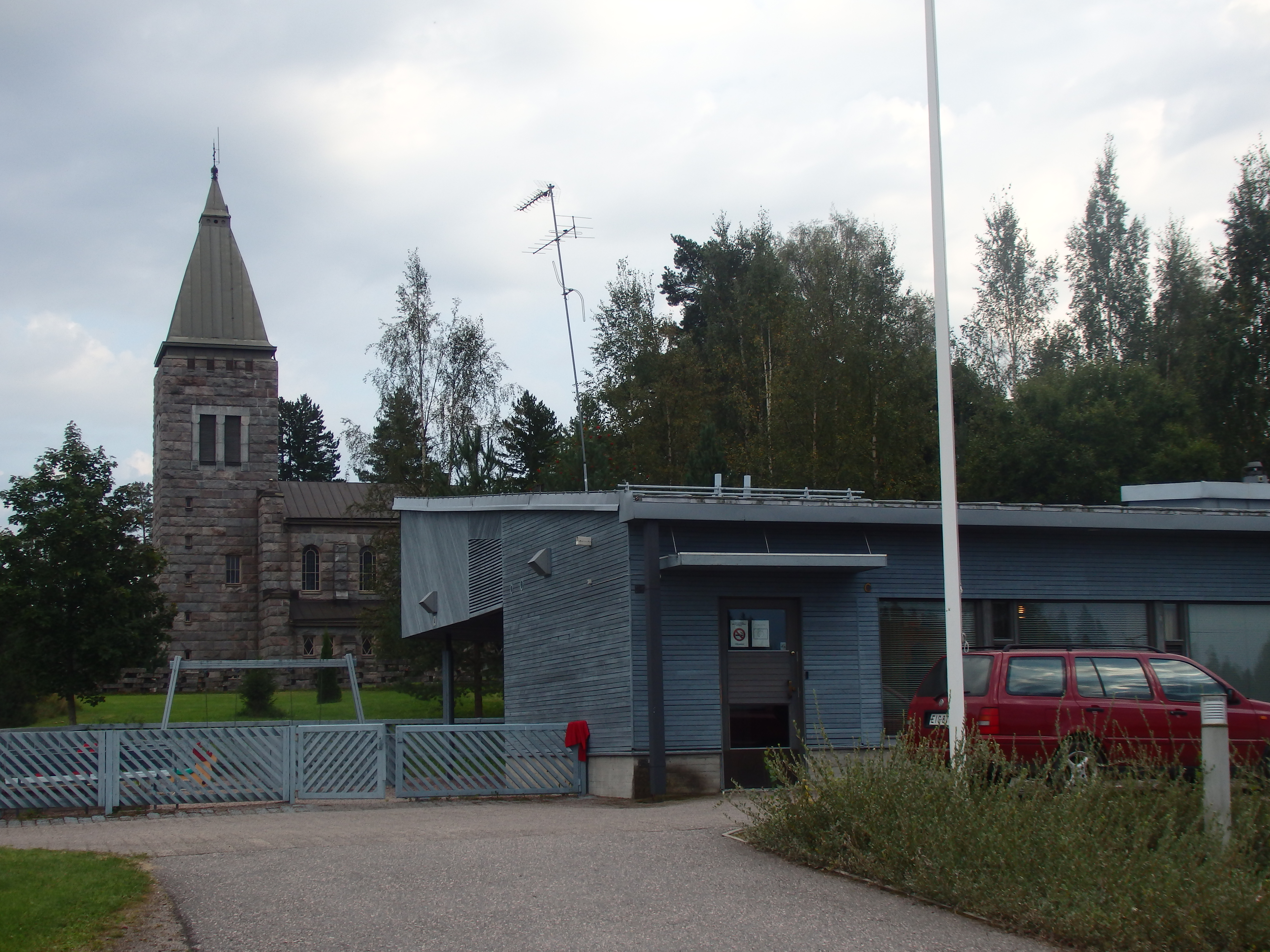
- The Pornainen Church on the background

- Coat of arms

- Location of Pornainen in Finland
- Interactive map of Pornainen
- Coordinates: 60°28.5′N 025°22.5′E
- Country: Finland
- Region: Uusimaa
- Sub-region: Helsinki sub-region
- Metropolitan area: Helsinki metropolitan area
- Charter: 1869
- Seat: Kirveskoski

Government
  - Municipal manager: Hannu Haukkasalo

Area (2018-01-01)
  - Total: 150.09 km^{2} (57.95 sq mi)
  - Land: 146.53 km^{2} (56.58 sq mi)
  - Water: 3.59 km^{2} (1.39 sq mi)
  - Rank: 278th largest in Finland

Population (2025-12-31)
  - Total: 4,919
  - Rank: 166th largest in Finland
  - Density: 33.57/km^{2} (86.9/sq mi)

Population by native language
  - Finnish: 93.7% (official)
  - Swedish: 2.3%
  - Others: 3.9%

Population by age
  - 0 to 14: 19.6%
  - 15 to 64: 63.7%
  - 65 or older: 16.7%
- Time zone: UTC+02:00 (EET)
  - Summer (DST): UTC+03:00 (EEST)
- Climate: Dfb
- Website: pornainen.fi

Pornainen (Finnish: [ˈpornɑi̯nen]; Swedish: Borgnäs) is a small municipality of Finland. It is located in the province of Southern Finland and is part of the Uusimaa region. The neighboring municipalities are Askola in the east, Mäntsälä in the north, Porvoo in the southeast and Sipoo in the southwest. It is located 18 kilometres (11 mi) east of the town of Järvenpää.

The municipality has a population of 4,919 (31 December 2025) and covers an area of 150.09 square kilometres (57.95 sq mi) of which 3.59 km^{2} (1.39 sq mi) is water. The administrative centre of municipality is Kirveskoski (about 2,000 residents), also known as Pornainen's church village, and second largest village is Halkia (about 500 residents). The population density is 33.57 inhabitants per square kilometre (86.9/sq mi).

Movies and scenes for TV productions and short films have been filmed in Pornainen from the 1930s to the present day. In the publications of film industry, Pornainen was once named the most photographed locality in Finland, that is why the municipality has marketed itself under the nickname "Hollywood of Finland". The village of Laukkoski is known as a summer destination for many former celebrities, such as actress Regina Linnanheimo, and writers Mika Waltari and Juhani Aho.

The municipality is unilingually Finnish.

== Politics ==
Results of the 2023 Finnish parliamentary election in Pornainen:

- Finns 32.6%
- Social Democratic Party 19.0%
- National Coalition Party 17.3%
- Centre Party 12.6%
- Movement Now 4.8%
- Green League 3.7%
- Christian Democrats 3.2%
- Left Alliance 2.7%
- Swedish People's Party 1.5%
- Vapauden Liitto 1.0%

In August 2025, along with the South Savonian municipality of Sulkava, Pornainen was one of two municipalities in Finland where the council and municipal government presidencies, including vice-chairs, consist entirely of women.

== Notable people ==
- Wiljo Tuompo (1893–1957)
- Seppo Aho (born 1944)
- Joona Sotala (born 1998)

== Twin town ==
- Taksony, Hungary, since 2003
