= Helsinki urban area =

Metropolitan area in Finland

Coordinates: 60.1708°N 24.9375°E

A map of Helsingin keskustaajama

The Helsinki urban area (Finnish: Helsingin keskustaajama, Swedish: Helsingfors centraltätort) is the largest urban area (Finnish: taajama) in Finland. It is located in the Uusimaa region in Finland and has about 1.36 million inhabitants as of 2023, making it the second largest urban area in the Nordic countries.

The urban area includes, among other areas, the city of Helsinki as well as the cities of Espoo, Kauniainen and Vantaa, and it is also connected to the towns of Kerava and Järvenpää, which form their own urban areas.

== See also ==
- Tampere urban area
- List of urban areas in the Nordic countries
