= Urban areas in the Nordic countries =

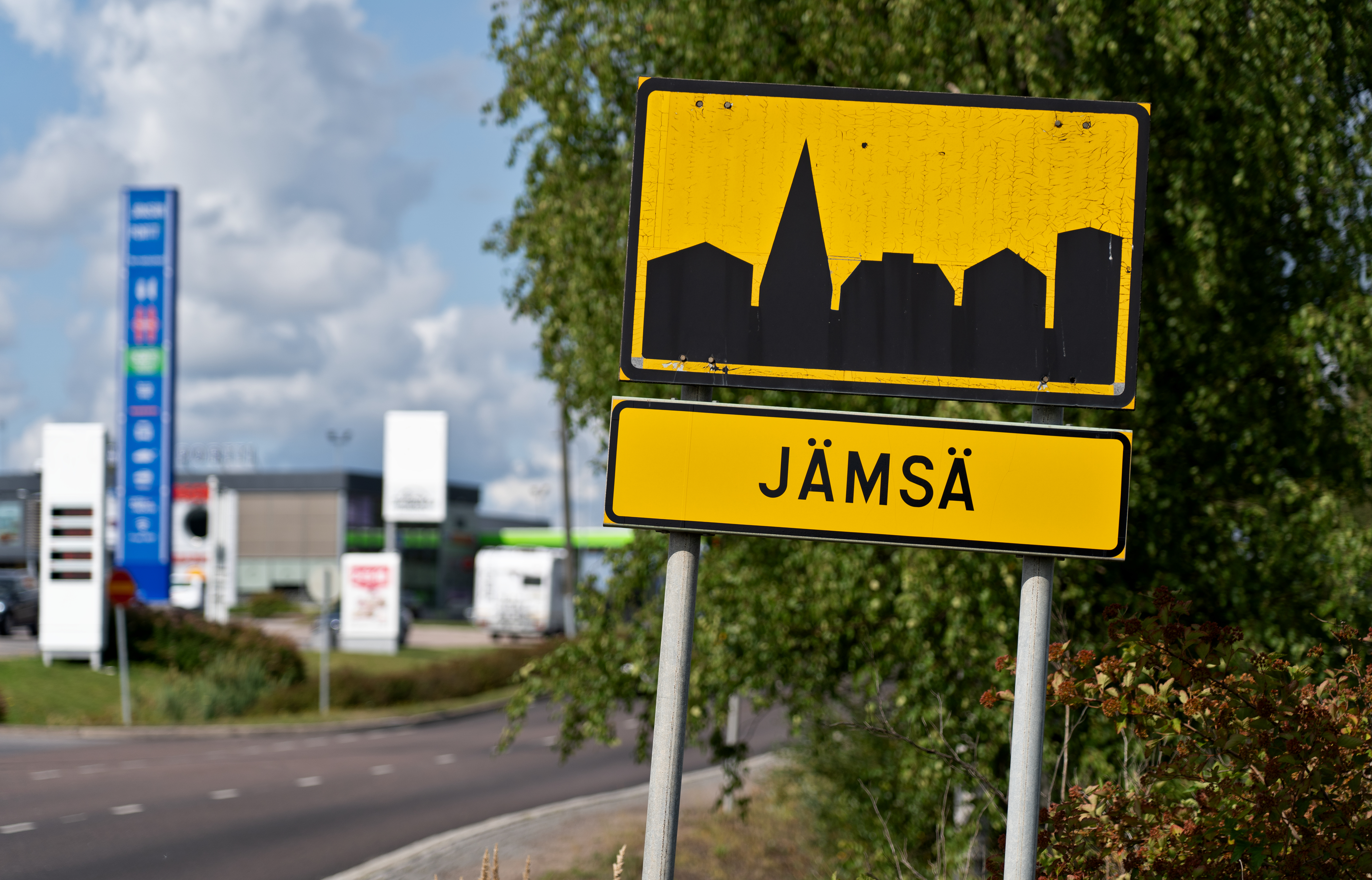
In some Nordic countries, the start of an urban area is indicated by specific signs. The picture of an urban area sign in Jämsä, Finland.

An urban area in the Nordic countries, with the exception of Iceland, is defined as a distinct statistical concept used to differentiate population clusters independent of municipal borders. The population is measured on a national level, independently by each country's statistical bureau. Statistics Sweden uses the term tätort (urban settlement), Statistics Finland also uses tätort in Swedish and taajama in Finnish, Statistics Denmark uses byområde (city), while Statistics Norway uses tettsted (urban settlement).

A uniform statistical definition between the Nordic countries was agreed upon in 1960, which defines an urban area as a continuous built-up area whose population is at least 200 inhabitants and where the maximum distance between residences is 200 metres; discounting roads, parking spaces, parks, sports grounds and cemeteries – without regard to the ward, municipal or county boundaries. Despite the uniform definition, the various statistical bureaus have different approaches in conducting these measurements, resulting in slight variations between the different countries. (Note: For example, Statistics Finland utilizes a grid system of 62,500 square metres (15.4 acres) for analyzing population, resulting in slight measurement differences between it and the other Nordic statistical bureaus.)

Despite belonging to the Nordic countries, Iceland does not follow the same definition of "urban area" for statistical purposes. The Nordic definition is unique to the four other countries, and should not be confused with the international concepts of metropolitan area or urban areas in general.

== Urban areas in Sweden ==
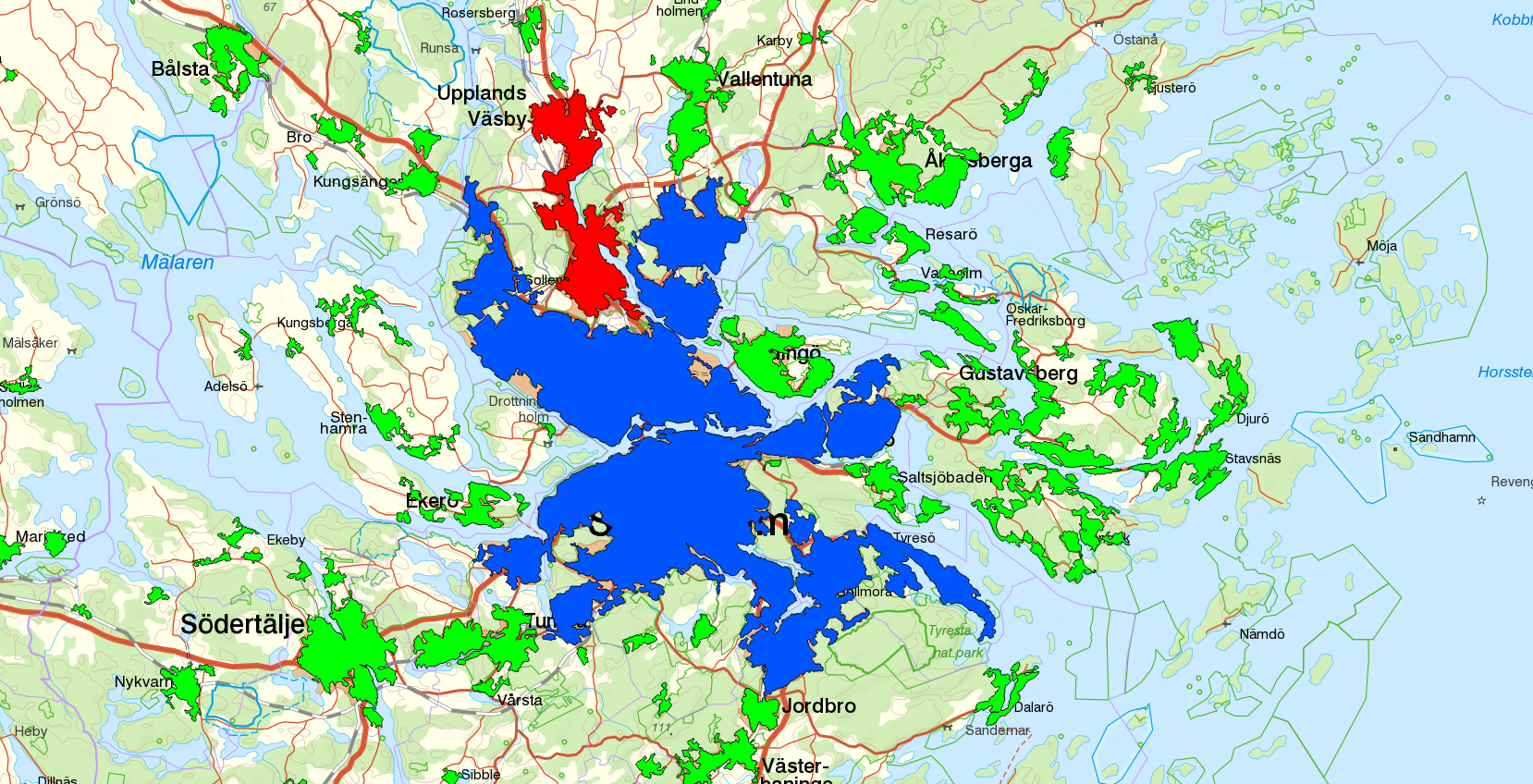
The largest urban area in the Nordic countries surrounds Stockholm. The Stockholm urban area Sollentuna and Upplands Väsby Other smaller urban areas

In Sweden, urban areas are measured by the national statistical institution Statistics Sweden. They utilize the native language term tätort in Swedish and "locality" in English. There are a total 1,979 localities in Sweden, with the largest being the Stockholm urban area at approximately 1,580,000 inhabitants in 2017. Roughly 87% of the Swedish population lives within localities.

Statistics Sweden also utilizes småort "smaller locality" to refer to a rural locality with 50–199 inhabitants in a contiguous built-up area with no more than 150 meters between houses. The concept is rarely used outside the field of statistics, where it is used for settlements just below the limit defined for tätort.

== Urban areas in Finland ==
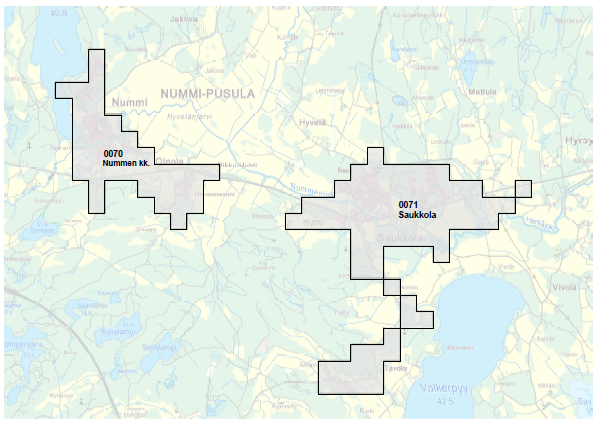
An example of Finnish urban area borders, defined along a 250 m (820 ft) by 250 m (820 ft) grid

In Finland, urban areas are measured by the national statistical institution Statistics Finland. They utilize the native language terms tätort in Swedish and taajama in Finnish. The largest urban area in Finland is the Helsingin keskustaajama ("Helsinki central urban area") with approximately 1,270,000 inhabitants in 2017. It extends across Helsinki as well as 10 other municipalities in the Greater Helsinki area. The second largest is the Tampereen keskustaajama with approximately 330,000 inhabitants in 2017.

Statistics Finland measures urban areas along a 250 m (820 ft) by 250 m (820 ft) grid, resulting in minor inaccuracies and differences in definition between it and the other Nordic countries. The rough presence of urban areas is used to regulate traffic, with a default of 50 kilometres per hour (31 mph) speed limit inside a taajama and 80 kilometres per hour (50 mph) outside. Most major roads leading in or out of an urban area are marked with a road sign.

== Urban areas in Norway ==
Despite adhering to the same definition of an urban area as the rest of the Nordics, Norway utilizes an automated demarcation system, in use since 1999. The demarcation system has been updated on a few occasions, most recently in 2013. In 2013, there were a total of 963 differentiated urban areas in the country. The largest of these is the urban area surrounding Oslo, with a population of approximately 1 million.

== See also ==
- List of urban areas in the Nordic countries
