= Mäntsälä =

Municipality in Uusimaa, Finland

- Municipality
- Mäntsälän kunta Mäntsälä kommun
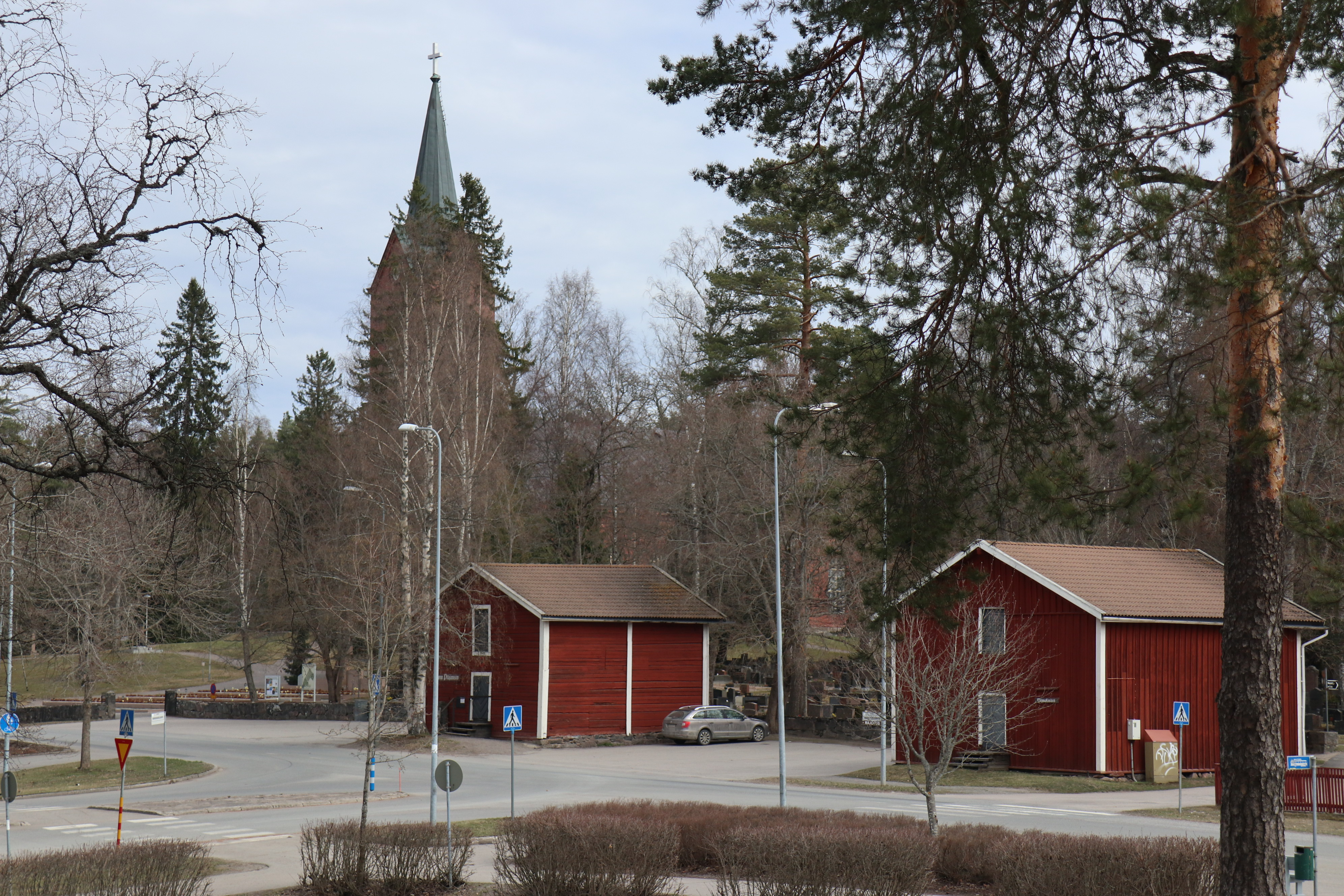
- The church hill of Mäntsälä (Mäntsälän kirkonmäki). The church tower in the background.

- Coat of arms

- Location of Mäntsälä in Finland
- Interactive map of Mäntsälä
- Country: Finland
- Region: Uusimaa
- Sub-region: Helsinki sub-region
- Metropolitan area: Helsinki metropolitan area
- Charter: 1585
- Seat: Mäntsälä (Kirkonkylä)
- Villages: Numminen, Sääksjärvi Sälinkää

Government
  - Municipal manager: Esko Kairesalo

Area (2018-01-01)
  - Total: 596.11 km^{2} (230.16 sq mi)
  - Land: 580.85 km^{2} (224.27 sq mi)
  - Water: 15.26 km^{2} (5.89 sq mi)
  - Rank: 145th largest in Finland

Population (2025-12-31)
  - Total: 20,861
  - Rank: 49th largest in Finland
  - Density: 35.91/km^{2} (93.0/sq mi)

Population by native language
  - Finnish: 93.2% (official)
  - Swedish: 0.7%
  - Others: 6.1%

Population by age
  - 0 to 14: 19.4%
  - 15 to 64: 61%
  - 65 or older: 19.6%
- Time zone: UTC+02:00 (EET)
  - Summer (DST): UTC+03:00 (EEST)
- Climate: Dfb
- Website: www.mantsala.fi

Mäntsälä (Finnish pronunciation: [ˈmæntsælæ]) is a municipality in the province of Southern Finland, and is part of the Uusimaa region. It has a population of 20,861 (31 December 2025) and covers an area of 596.11 square kilometres (230.16 sq mi) of which 15.26 km^{2} (5.89 sq mi) is water. The population density is 35.91 inhabitants per square kilometre (93.0/sq mi). The municipality is unilingually Finnish. Mäntsälä is one of three municipalities in the Uusimaa region that do not have a Swedish name; the others are Nurmijärvi and Askola.

Mäntsälä lies about 60 kilometres (40 mi) north of Helsinki, the capital of Finland. During the last few years, the population of Mäntsälä has been one of the most rapidly increasing in Finland. A new railway, the Kerava–Lahti railway line, was built between Kerava and Lahti with passenger traffic starting on 4 September 2006 from Mäntsälä railway station. Helsinki is about 40 minutes away, and Lahti even closer. Highway 4 (E75) connecting both cities passes through Mäntsälä.

The coat of arms of Mäntsälä has its theme in the region's traditional livelihoods; the head of the moose refers to the hunting lands of the region, and the clovers symbolizes local agriculture. The coat of arms was designed by Olof Eriksson and approved by the Mäntsälä Municipal Council on 16 December 1950. The coat of arms was officially approved by the Ministry of the Interior on 20 February 1951.

== History ==
Mäntsälä is considered to have been founded in 1585, when the community's first church was built. The current church was completed in 1866 after delay. The Crimean War affected also Mäntsälä: funds for building the church were spent on war efforts. All of the churches were located on Kirkonmäki ("Church Hill") at about the same spot.

The first common school was founded in 1870 by way of a testament of clergyman Abraham Ehnroos. To his credit is the founding of a public library already in 1840. An intermediate school was not founded until 1945 with a high school following in 1954, previously facilities in Porvoo, Järvenpää and Helsinki were used.

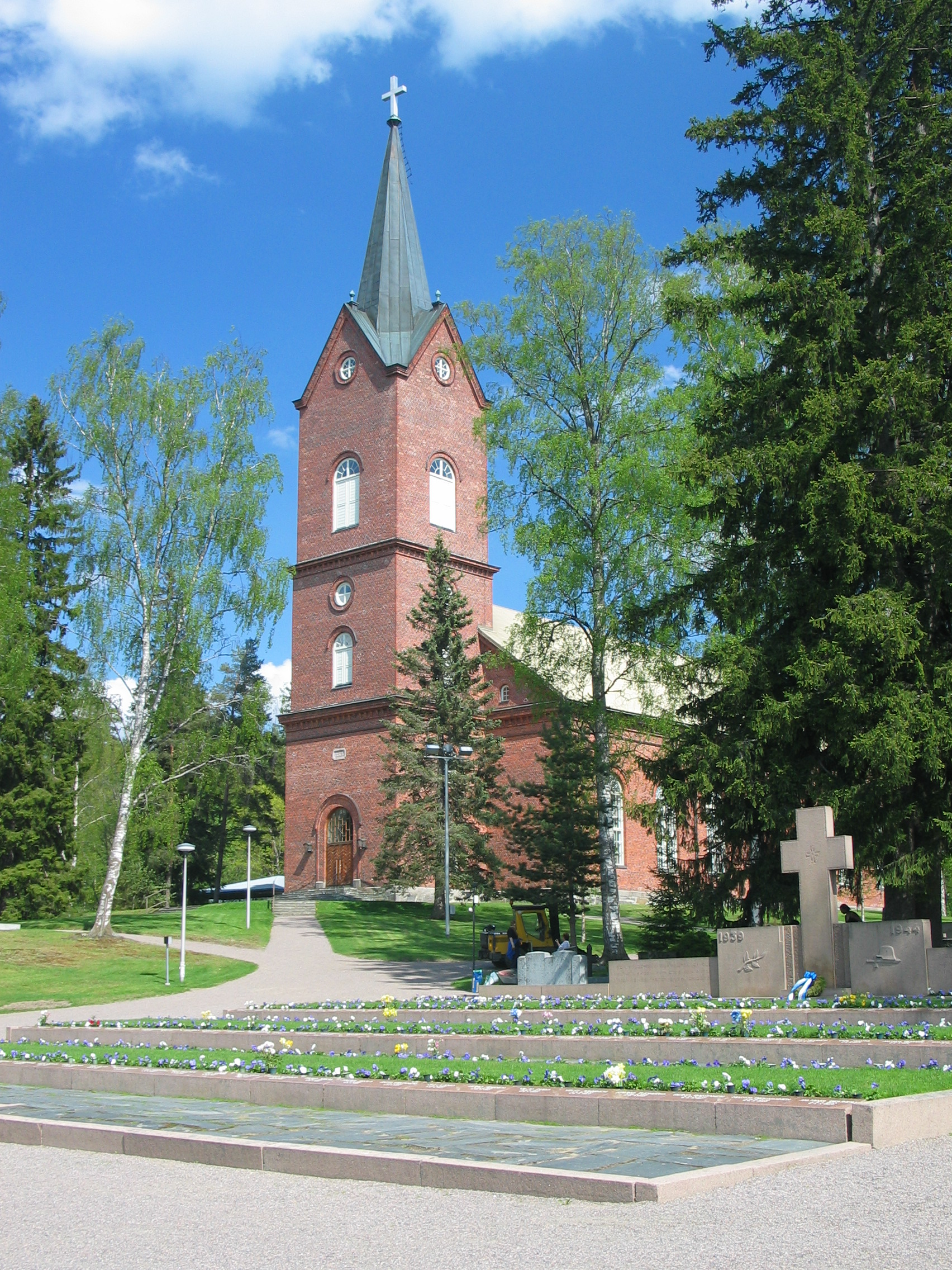
The church of Mäntsälä was completed in 1866.

In 1854 the first town hall was built on Kirkonmäki. Today a museum is operating in the building, having also served as a morgue, school kitchen and lesson space, and a dormitory. It is deteriorating severely and the museum is only opened upon request.

The second town hall was built in 1935, also on Kirkonmäki. It served until the completion of the present town hall in 1992. Now it houses an open college.

There is a total of 15 manors in Mäntsälä, 4 of which are open to the public, the rest being private residences. Russian czar Alexander I visited as guest of Ulla Möllersvärd in 1809 in the Mäntsälä manor lying in the town center. The manors emerged in the 17th century as noblemen feoffs. Traditionally the land belonged to the manors. There were many crofts in Mäntsälä and new legislation in 1918 enabled the crofters to claim the land for themselves. In the 1920s the manors were still a sizable land owner in the parish.

Mäntsälä is especially known for the Mäntsälä rebellion. About 400 civil guards went shooting to a Social Democratic party rally at Ohkola community hall, interrupting it. In the course of a few days leaders of Lapua Movement and armed civil guards from all over the country arrived to Mäntsälä. The government ordered them arrested, and after a speech by president Svinhufvud on 2 March the situation gradually settled down. The movement disbanded early in spring.

World War II brought about 2000 refugees evacuated from Karelia to Mäntsälä. They came mainly from Kirvu and Koivisto. Land was cut from the manors again for the arrivals, reducing manor estate considerably. In 1985 a museum about the Kirvu parish was opened next to the church in the city center.

In 1992 an apartment trade fair was held in Mäntsälä. The area is being expanded and since 2006, a train depot lies next to it.

A discount chain Tokmanni's head office, logistics center and warehouse, founded in 1989, are in Mäntsälä. Also, Yandex built one of its data centers in Mäntsälä in 2015, with a second data center expected to be built in 2020 by Lehto.

== Demographics ==
The population of Mäntsälä has stayed quite level for decades, but the building of a motorway up to Järvenpää in the 1970s and the extension to Lahti in 1999 have brought new residents from the metropolitan area. By the middle of the 2000s the new railroad to Lahti has been central in municipality population growth. Many people moved to Mäntsälä because of the railroad, that offered quick commuting to Helsinki.

- 1749: 1,492 (unconfirmed)
- 1898: 7,972 (unconfirmed)
- 1920: 7,666
- 1930: 7,844
- 1940: 7,739
- 1950: 11,072
- 1960: 10,932
- 1970: 10,166
- 1980: 11,267
- 1990: 14,793
- 2000: 16,628
- 2005: 18,226
- 2007: 18,980
- 2010: 19 975
- 2012: 20 478

=== Urban areas ===
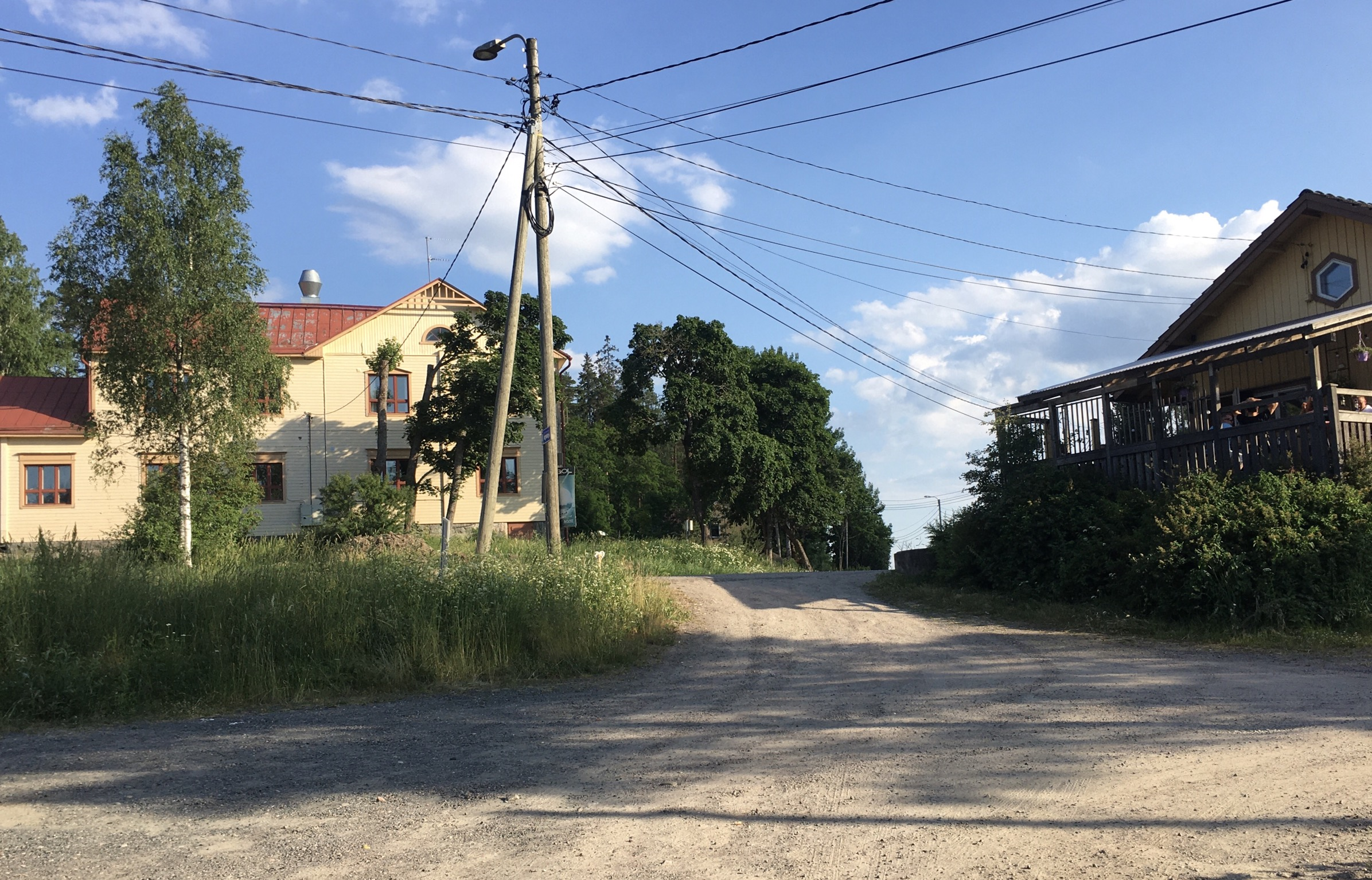
The village centre of Numminen

Table of the all statistical urban areas of the municipality. The administrative centre is in bold.

| # | Urban area | Population (31 December 2020) |
|---|---|---|
| 1 | **Mäntsälä** (Kirkonkylä) | 11,621 |
| 2 | Helsinki urban area* | 2,708 |
| 3 | Numminen | 329 |
| 4 | Sääksjärvi | 275 |
| 5 | Sälinkää | 242 |

The Helsinki urban area, marked with an asterisk (*), belongs to this municipality only partially, as it extends not only to Mäntsälä but also to the area of several neighboring municipalities of Helsinki.

== Politics ==
Results of the 2019 Finnish parliamentary election in Mäntsälä:

- Finns Party 23.4%
- Social Democratic Party 21.1%
- National Coalition Party 16.2%
- Centre Party 14.7%
- Green League 7.8%
- Movement Now 4.6%
- Left Alliance 3.9%
- Christian Democrats 2.9%
- Blue Reform 1.9%
- Other parties 3.4%

== Notable people ==
Adolf Erik Nordenskiöld is considered to be originally from Mäntsälä, having spent his early youth on the family estate in the Numminen village, although he was born in Helsinki and lived also in Sweden. Nordenskiöld was a nineteenth-century geologist and Arctic explorer.

Others include member of Lordi-band Jussi Sydänmaa alias "Amen", and former defence minister Elisabeth Rehn in her youth. Former prime minister Antti Rinne also lives in Mäntsälä.

== See also ==
- Mäntsälä rebellion
- Mäntsälä Airfield
