= Tišina =

Tišina may refer to:

- Tišina, Slovenia, a town near Murska Sobota
- Tišina, Zenica, a village in Bosnia and Herzegovina
- Tišina, Šamac, a village in Bosnia and Herzegovina
- Tišina Kaptolska, a village near Martinska Ves, Croatia
- Tišina Erdedska, a village near Martinska Ves, Croatia
