= Fredericktown Ferry =

Coordinates: 40.0032°N 79.9954°W

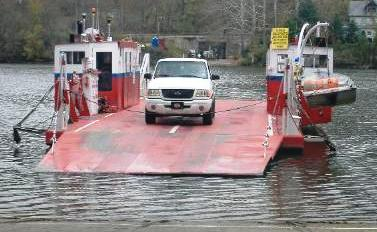

The Fredericktown Ferry (nicknamed Fred) was a cable-driven ferry that operated on the Monongahela River in southwestern Pennsylvania about 30 miles south of Pittsburgh from 1948 until May 2013. The ferry consisted of a 60-foot steel boat that could hold up to 6 vehicles at a time. It connected the village of Fredericktown in Washington County with the village of La Belle in Fayette County which are separated by the 400 feet (120 m) width of the river. The nearest bridge crossing is about 4 miles (6.4 km) north via the PA Turnpike 43. In 2013, the ferry cost $2 per motor vehicle and $0.50 per pedestrian and was subsidized by Washington and Fayette Counties.

The ferry service was discontinued due to low ridership and mounting financial deficits in 2013.

== See also ==
- List of crossings of the Monongahela River
