= Friesenheimer Insel – Sandhofen Ferry =

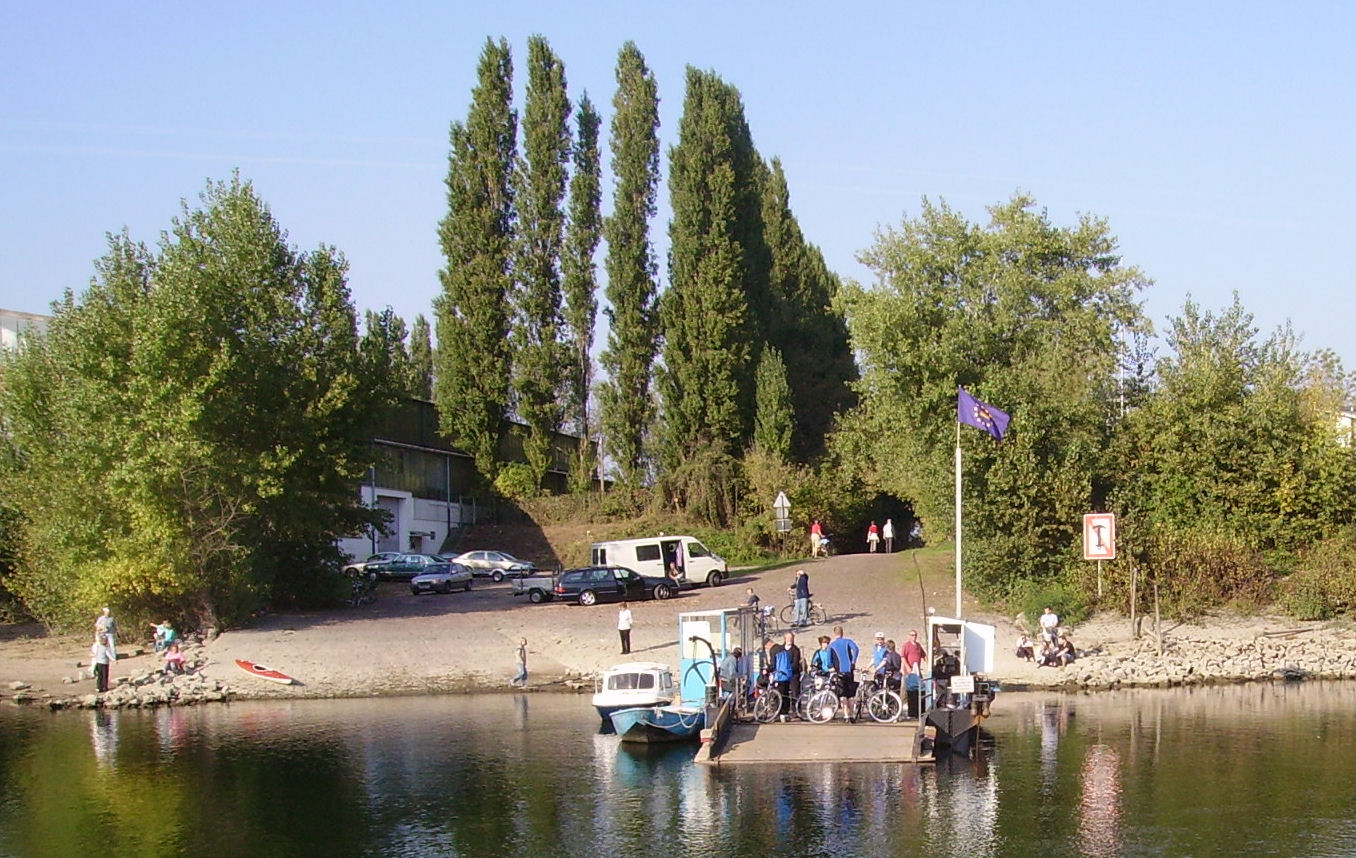
Ferry at shore of the Friesenheimer island

The Friesenheimer Insel - Sandofen ferry is Germany's oldest working chain ferry. It connects Sandhofen with the Friesenheimer Island on a daily basis between 15 March and 31 October.

The ferry was built in 1897 in Neckarsulm. It currently uses a cable powered by a 1975 diesel engine. The maximum capacity is 145 persons or 10 tons.
