= Pikkarala Ferry =

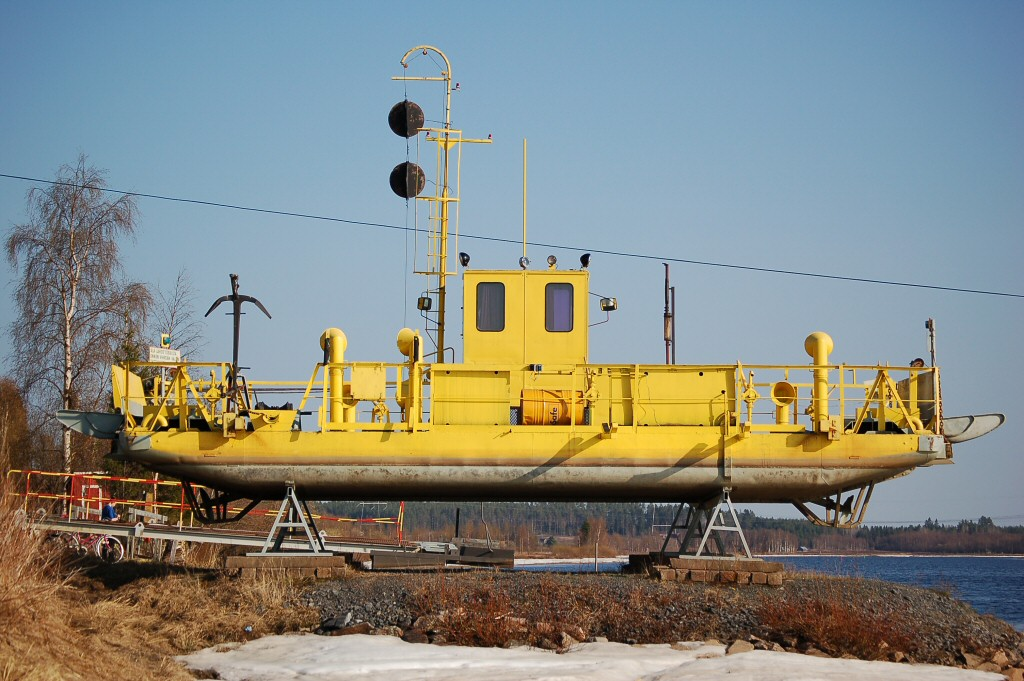
Pikkarala ferry wintering on the shore of Oulujoki.

Pikkarala Ferry (Pikkaralan lossi in Finnish) is a single-operator cable-guided ferry operating across Oulujoki river between Pikkarala and Lapinkangas. The ferry route is a part of Pikkarala private road. The ferry operates between 08:00–17:00 from Monday to Friday and 08:00–15:00 on Saturdays when traffic so requires. Typically the operating season starts at about mid-May and lasts until about mid-October.

Due to the retirement of the ferry operator and the change in the user group, the ferry does not operate during the 2022 season.

The ferry is operated under the funding from the City of Oulu and the State of Finland. Approximately one-fifth of the funding comes from the city, the rest comes from the state. The annual costs are approximately 25.000 euros, and the transport employs one person for a bit over half a year.

The ferry service began in 1930s when a man-powered ferry was taken in service, and there has been a ferry at the very same location every year since. The man-powered ferry was replaced with a ferry equipped a boat engine. The current ferry was taken in service in 1992. Originally the current ferry served as a "Sanki Ferry" only a few miles downstream, but it was discontinued when the Sanki Bridge was built.
