= Oijen Ferry =

Coordinates: 51.830414°N 5.497048°E

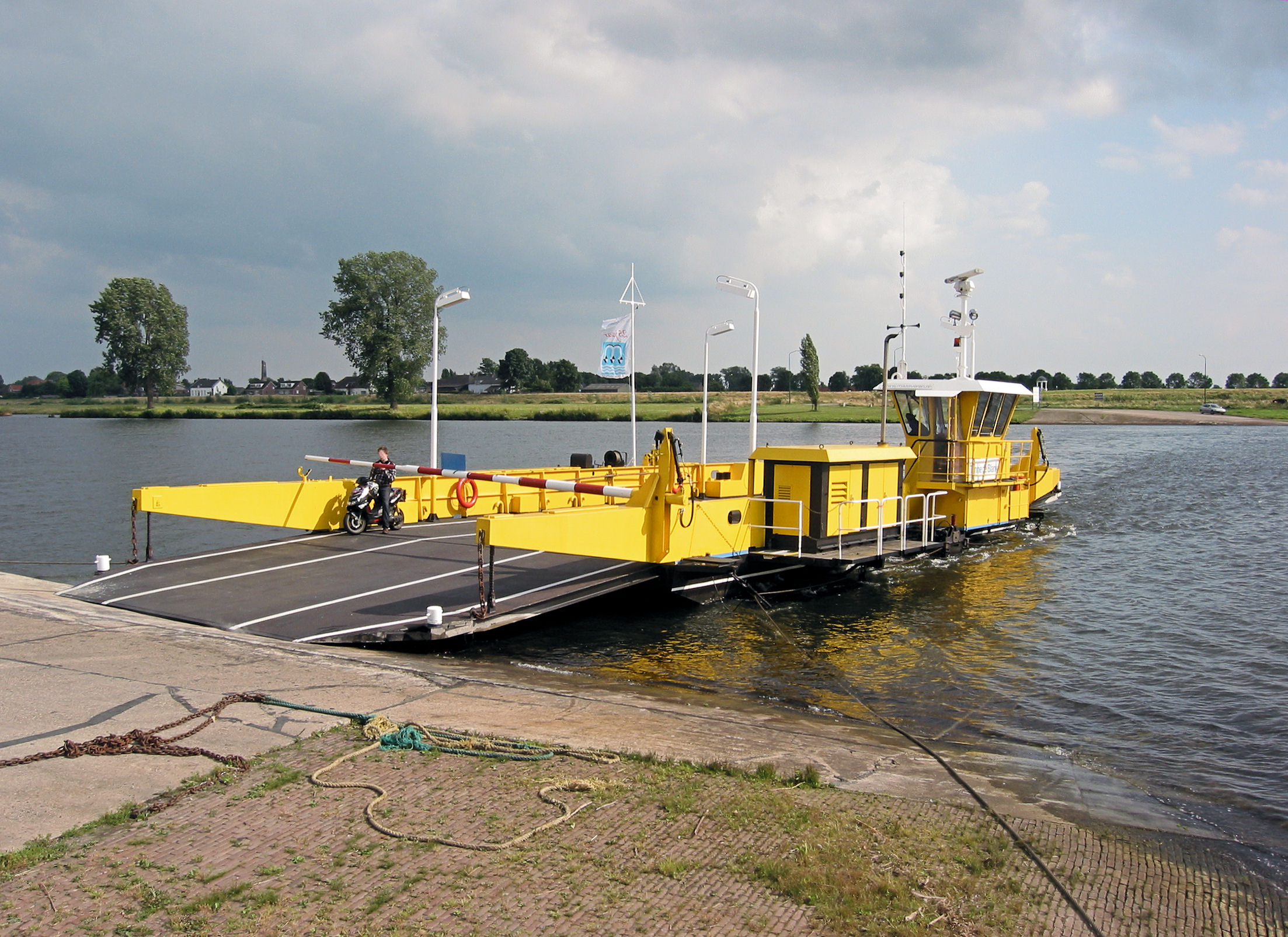
The Oijen Ferry.

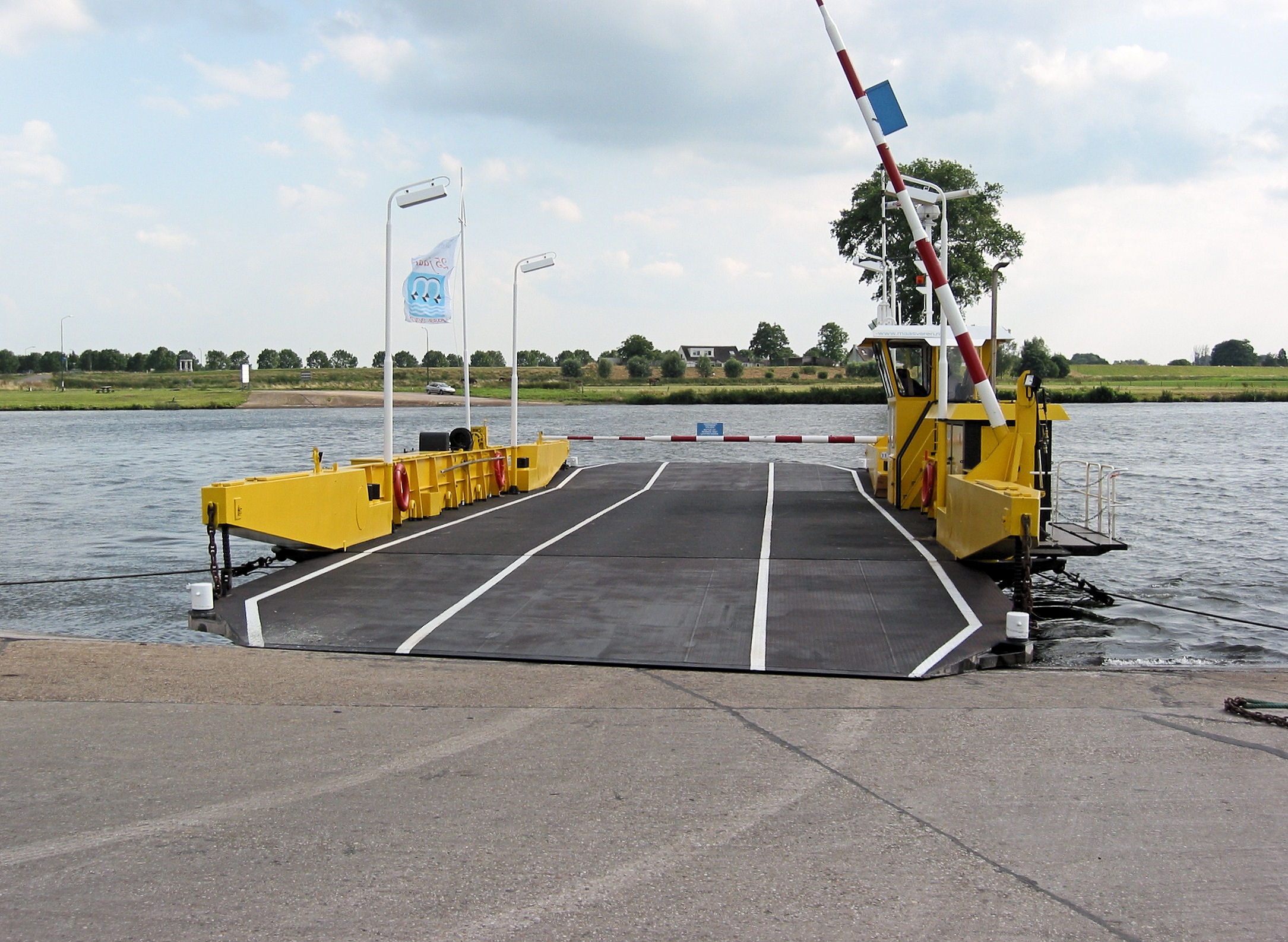
The ferry boat.

The Oijen Ferry is a cable ferry across the river Meuse in the Netherlands. The ferry crosses from the village of Oijen in North Brabant, to a point near Alphen in Gelderland. The crossing is located some 24 kilometres (15 mi) north-east of 's-Hertogenbosch.
