= Tišina, Zenica =

Tišina
- Village
- Location within Bosnia and Herzegovina
- Coordinates: 44.165155°N 17.9763178°E
- Country: Bosnia and Herzegovina
- Entity: Federation of Bosnia and Herzegovina
- Canton: Zenica-Doboj
- Municipality: Zenica

Area
  - Total: 1.42 sq mi (3.68 km^{2})

Population (2013)
  - Total: 675
  - Density: 475/sq mi (183/km^{2})
- Time zone: UTC+1 (CET)
  - Summer (DST): UTC+2 (CEST)

Tišina is a village in the City of Zenica, Bosnia and Herzegovina.

== Demographics ==
According to the 2013 census, its population was 675.

Ethnicity in 2013
Ethnicity	Number	Percentage
Bosniaks	659	97.6%
Serbs	8	1.2%
Croats	1	0.1%
other/undeclared	7	1.0%
Total	675	100%
