= Tišina Kaptolska =

- Village
- Interactive map of Tišina Kaptolska
- Coordinates: 45.5268°N 16.3757°E
- Country: Croatia

Area
  - Total: 2.2 sq mi (5.7 km^{2})

Population (2021)
  - Total: 219
  - Density: 100/sq mi (38/km^{2})
- Time zone: UTC+1 (CET)
  - Summer (DST): UTC+2 (CEST)

Tišina Kaptolska is a village in Croatia, situated at an altitude of 96m, 15 kilometres (9 mi) from to Sisak.

== Population ==
Village of Tišina Kaptolska: Population trends 1857–2021
v

population	158	133	124	174	211	247	247	262	273	276	323	334	267	308	289	259	219
	1857	1869	1880	1890	1900	1910	1921	1931	1948	1953	1961	1971	1981	1991	2001	2011	2021

Sources: Croatian Bureau of Statistics publications
