= Swedish colonisation of Finland =

Period in Finnish history

The Swedish colonisation of Finland took place during the Northern Crusades from the 12th century until the 1350s. Sweden's colonisation efforts focused on the Finnish archipelago and some of its coastal regions and brought speakers of the Swedish language to Finland. The settlers were from central Sweden. It has been estimated that there were thousands of settlers.

Sebastian Münster took notice of the Swedish-speaking population in Finland in his 1544 book Cosmographia. Other than this, the Swedish speakers of Finland attracted less interest among the writings of academics. Mikael Wexonius who served as a professor at the Royal Academy of Åbo in the 17th century took notice of the Swedish-speaking population of the coastal areas of Ostrobothnia and Nyland in his study of the Swedish realm. Wexonius considered these people as descendants of Swedes, but he did not mention the Swedish-speaking population in Åboland. The question of the origin of the Swedish-speaking population in Finland started attracting academic interest in the 18th century and it became an important question in the 19th century when it was important to the concept of national self-understanding.

== History ==
The reason behind the colonisation was the pursuit of the Roman Catholic Church to spread its faith to pagan lands around the Baltic Sea. The settlers were Christians and they arrived to lands that were still in major parts under Finnish paganism. Besides the Catholic Church, the colonisation was supported by the still primal Swedish Kingdom who granted four years of tax exemption to any Christian Swede who settled the areas of Southwest Finland, Uusimaa, Åland, Tavastia or Satakunta.

The colonisation was also affected by the favorable climate phase in Europe. The warm climate phase of 980–1250 had led to population growth, which led to the need for emigration. At the same time Swedes also emigrated to northern Sweden and western Estonia (see Estonian Swedes). In the 14th century Swedes also colonised Medelpad and Ångermanland.

Besides the violence of the crusades, the colonisation led to several conflicts between the settlers and Finns. The settlers needed support from Sweden in many areas against the Finns. The native inhabitants in many coastal areas also lost their fishing and farming rights, which led to conflicts. In 1348, Hemming of Turku, Bishop of Turku and the head of the Turku Castle, gave a letter of protection to the settlers in the area of the Gulf of Bothnia. As a result of the colonisation, some of the pagan inhabitants who refused to receive the new Catholic religion from Tavastia and Satakunta started to move to the northern parts of Finland.

== Swedish colonisation of Finland ==
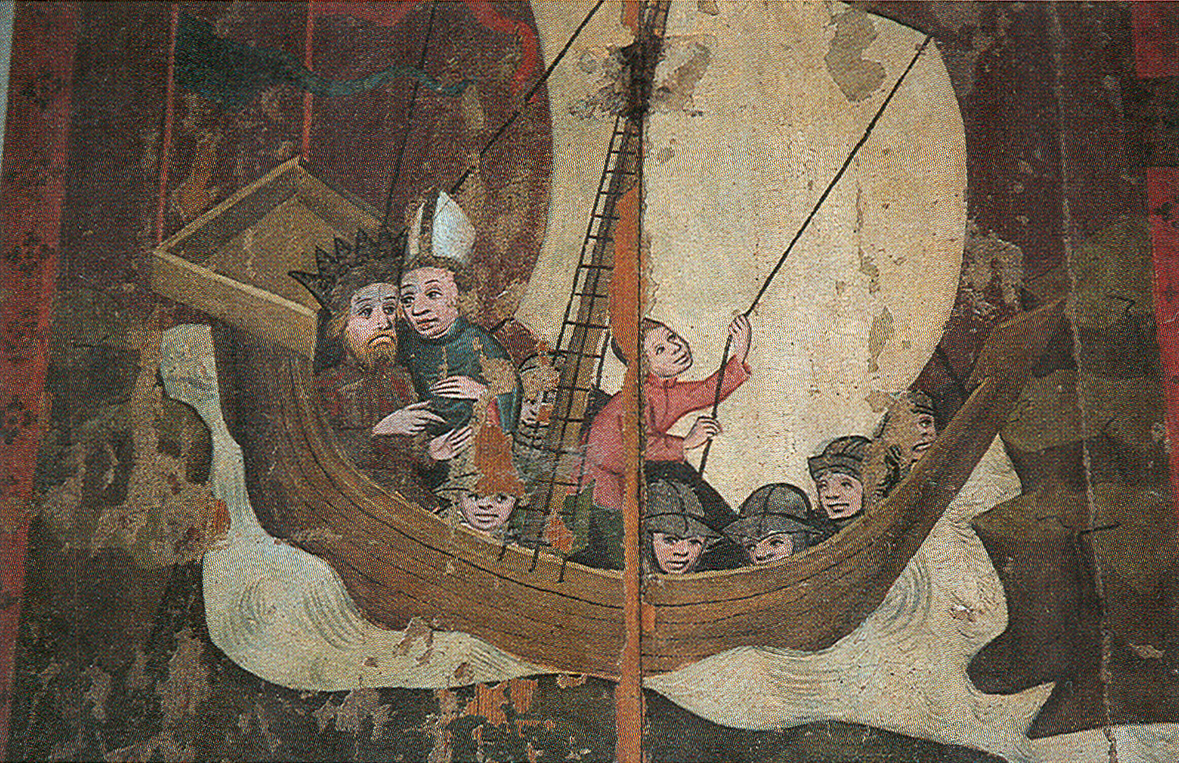
A Medieval painting from Uppland, showing king Saint Erik and bishop Henry from Uppsala on their way to Finland during the First Swedish Crusade.

=== Settlement of Åland ===
In the first phase, Swedish colonisation reached Åland at the time of the First Swedish Crusade in the 1150s. Swedish place names seem to have been born in one single wave during the settlement of the archipelago. There are still some preserved Finnish place names in Åland. Presumably the outer islands of Åland were colonised later than the large main islands. Place names with the bolstad suffix have led to theories that the colonists were from Uppland and they met deserted ruins of houses in the area. Old cemeteries disappeared from Åland around the year 1000, giving rise to theories that the islands were deserted. According to this interpretation, the area changed into a wilderness hunting area for people from southern Finland with sporadic events of trade.

=== Settlement of Finland Proper and Satakunta ===
In the second phase, Swedish colonisation reached the islands of Finland Proper and the coastal areas of Satakunta. On the islands of Finland Proper, colonisation reached the towns of Iniö, Houtskari, Nauvo, Korppoo, Parainen, Hiittinen, Kemiö, Dragsfjärd and Västanfjärd and also to the area of Särkisalo. All Swedish place names in Finland Proper date to Medieval Finland.

The colonists first settled onto the arable lands of Parainen and Kemiö, and late to the eastern islands of Åland and the western islands of Finland Proper and finally to the kongsgårds in continental Finland, presumably of military security reasons. Kemiö was already populated when the Swedish colonists came to the area and it is possible that this led to a conflict with the original Finnish population. Judging by the partial continuity among the place names there had been Finnish-speaking population also in other areas colonised by the Swedish.

=== Colonisation of Nyland ===
The coat-of-arms of Nyland designed by Johannes Bureus in 1599. It depicts the Swedish colonisation of Nyland which Bureus wanted to honour. The coat-of-arms of Helsinki is also based on this original design by Bureus.

In the third phase, the colonists gradually moved along the coast eastwards to Nyland, moving first to western Nyland. Gunvor Kerkkonen has claimed that the Danish itinerary described the situation of Swedish colonisation in the 13th century. According to this, place names started appearing in Finnish slightly to the east of Hanko. Thus Swedish colonisation had not reached Nyland when the itinerary was written.

Colonisation of Nyland is possibly connected to the so-called Second Swedish Crusade against the Tavastians from 1249 to 1250. As a consequence, Swedish colonists who had previously moved to Finland Proper also moved to the Karjaa islands judging by the place names. On the coast of Nyland, Swedish colonists encountered Tavastians and Proper Finns living in the area. The largest groups of colonists settled into the towns of Pohja and Inkoo as well as the eastern parts of Helsinge and Pernaja, from where they continued to the southern parts of Karjalohja and Lohja as well as Tuusula, Askola and Myrskylä.

In honour of the Swedish colonisation of Nyland, Johannes Bureus designed the coats-of-arms of Nyland and Helsinki in 1599, depicting a ship travelling on the waves of the seas, representing the arrival of Swedish colonists to Nyland.

==== Settlement of western Nyland ====
In western Nyland, the colonists first arrived at Tenhola and Karjaa and settled among the old Finnish population. The birth of Karjaa has been estimated to have been in 1326, that of Kirkkonummi in 1330, Inkoo in 1337 and Lohja in 1382. The Karjaa area seems to have been fully colonised by the Swedish around the year 1400. In the 14th century, colonisation also reached Raseborg where the construction of the castle possibly attracted Swedish population.

==== Settlement of eastern Nyland ====
Eastern Nyland was populated in one organised settlement of Porvoo. It was led from above and the colonists were transported to Finland aboard sturdy ships from all areas of Svealand. The colonists were rewarded with grain, cattle and four years of exemption of tax. They served as workforce in construction of the kongsgårds and had a duty to upkeep the military. The arable lands of the coast of eastern Nyland and the river valleys were quickly populated, from where population later spread in many directions. The oldest Swedish population in eastern Nyland mentioned in historical sources is from Stensböle in Porvoo in 1327.

=== Swedish population east of Kymijoki ===
An important phase in Swedish colonisation concerns the Third Swedish Crusade against the Karelians in 1293. The river Kymijoki appears to have served as the border of Tavastian and Karelian population and Swedish colonisation crossed it somewhere around the late 13th or early 14th century. Very little information of this last phase of Swedish colonisation remains. Its traces disappeared already in the 16th century except for some place names. Many place names translated to Finnish on the coast are known in the areas of Vehkalahti and Virolahti. The colonisation has been seen as having been organised and supported by the Swedish upper class. The further away colonisation spread from central Sweden, the harder it was for peasants to move to the areas on their own.

=== Ostrobothnia ===
The Swedish place names in Ostrobothnia are Christian and date back to Medieval times. It has been suggested that Swedish colonisation to Ostrobothnia started in the late 13th and early 14th centuries along with the colonisation in eastern Nyland and Kymenlaakso. Colonists in Ostrobothnia were supported from Sweden and fishing bays and harbours in inland Finland inhabited by Finns were given to their use.

The Swedish historian Johannes Messenius lived in Vaasa in 1616 in order to find out how Swedish colonists had arrived in the area. He studied old documents and met with the local Swedish-speaking population. Based on his research, he saw that Birger Jarl had stepped ashore in Ostrobothnia on his way to Tavastia, conquering local resistance and having Swedish colonists settle in the area. Based on this research, Messenius concluded: "Where the local population was driven away from, Swedish colonists were allowed to settle among Finnish peasants. As inhabitants of every second village, that's why there are still Swedes living there. Their churches were built in Mustasaari and Pietarsaari and the ancient idols were no longer worshipped there. There are markets being held on the church grounds, often every year."

== Conflicts with Finns ==
Sources about the Crusades to Finland as well as Swedish traditional stories depict battles and other conflicts between the Swedes and the Finns. Ostrobothnian stories tell how military reinforcements from Sweden were required to help the colonists. Also Mikael Agricola wrote in the 16th century how paganist Finns harassed Swedish colonists, so they had to ask for help from their relatives in Sweden, which they also received. One story tells that the people that arrived from Sweden were mostly criminals and other troublemakers, arriving to Finland in order to battle the native Finns. In 1303 colonists arriving in the Kristiinankaupunki area were given permission to settle in the "Tavastian area" because of the Second Swedish Crusade. The mayor of Helsinki Anders Larsson Ehredt wrote to Per Brahe the Younger in 1639 that the name of Helsinki should not be changed when the city was moved because the name was "a memory of the victorious weapons of our forefathers". The original Finnish population of Kemiönsaari disappeard from the area when the Swedish colonists arrived, which can be seen as one of the conflicts between the groups.

Conflicts between Finns and the Swedish colonists also rose regarding the rights to the areas. Several letters about these conflicts are known. For example on 1 June 1303 the Swedish colonists in Satakunta had gone into conflict with the native Finns when their lands had been on the old slash-and-burn lands of the Finns. In 1347 an order was given to transfer the fishing rights in Helsinki from the Finns to the coastal Swedes. A protection letter from the bishop Hemming of Turku and the Turku castle commander is known from 1348, concerning protecting the Swedish colonists on the coast of the Gulf of Bothnia against the Finns.

Because of Christian colonisation from Sweden, population from Tavastia and Satakunta travelled to the north, because they refused to accept the new religion brought to their old homelands.

== See also ==
- Finland under Swedish rule
- First Swedish Crusade
- Second Swedish Crusade
- Third Swedish Crusade
