= Archipelago Sea =

Part of the Baltic Sea

Coordinates: 60.3°N 21°E

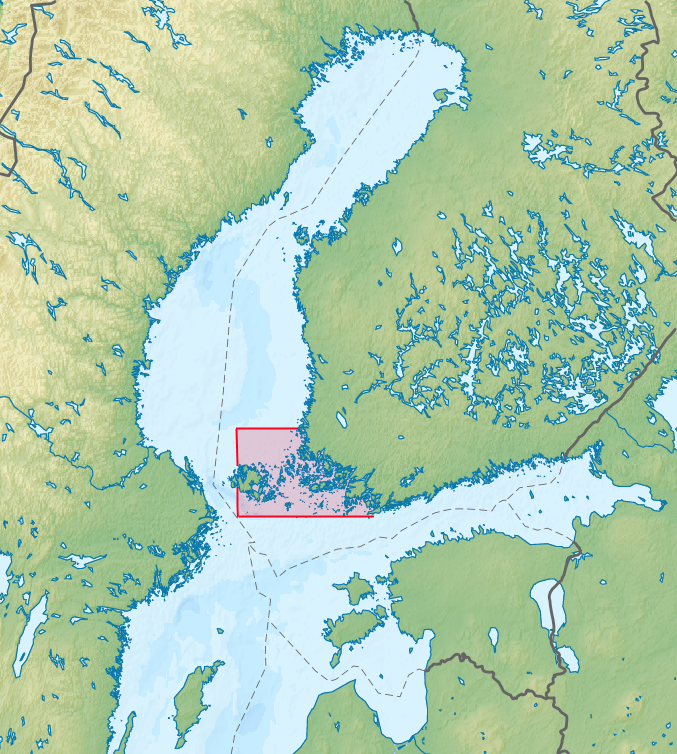
The Baltic Sea with the Archipelago Sea marked in red. Most of the islands are not visible at this resolution. 8,300 square kilometres

The Archipelago Sea (Swedish: Skärgårdshavet, Finnish: Saaristomeri) is a part of the Baltic Sea between the Gulf of Bothnia, the Gulf of Finland and the Sea of Åland, within Finnish territorial waters. By some definitions it contains the largest archipelago in the world by the number of islands, estimated at around 50,000, although many of the islands are very small and tightly clustered.

The larger islands are inhabited and connected by ferries and bridges. Åland, including the largest islands of the region, forms an autonomous region within Finland. The rest of the islands are part of the region of Southwest Finland. The Archipelago Sea is a significant tourist destination.

The Guardian's journalist Tristan Parker wrote an article praising the Turku Archipelago on July 29, 2021, mentioning that "nowhere has the gentle magic of the smaller islands – or their wildlife."

== Geography and geology ==
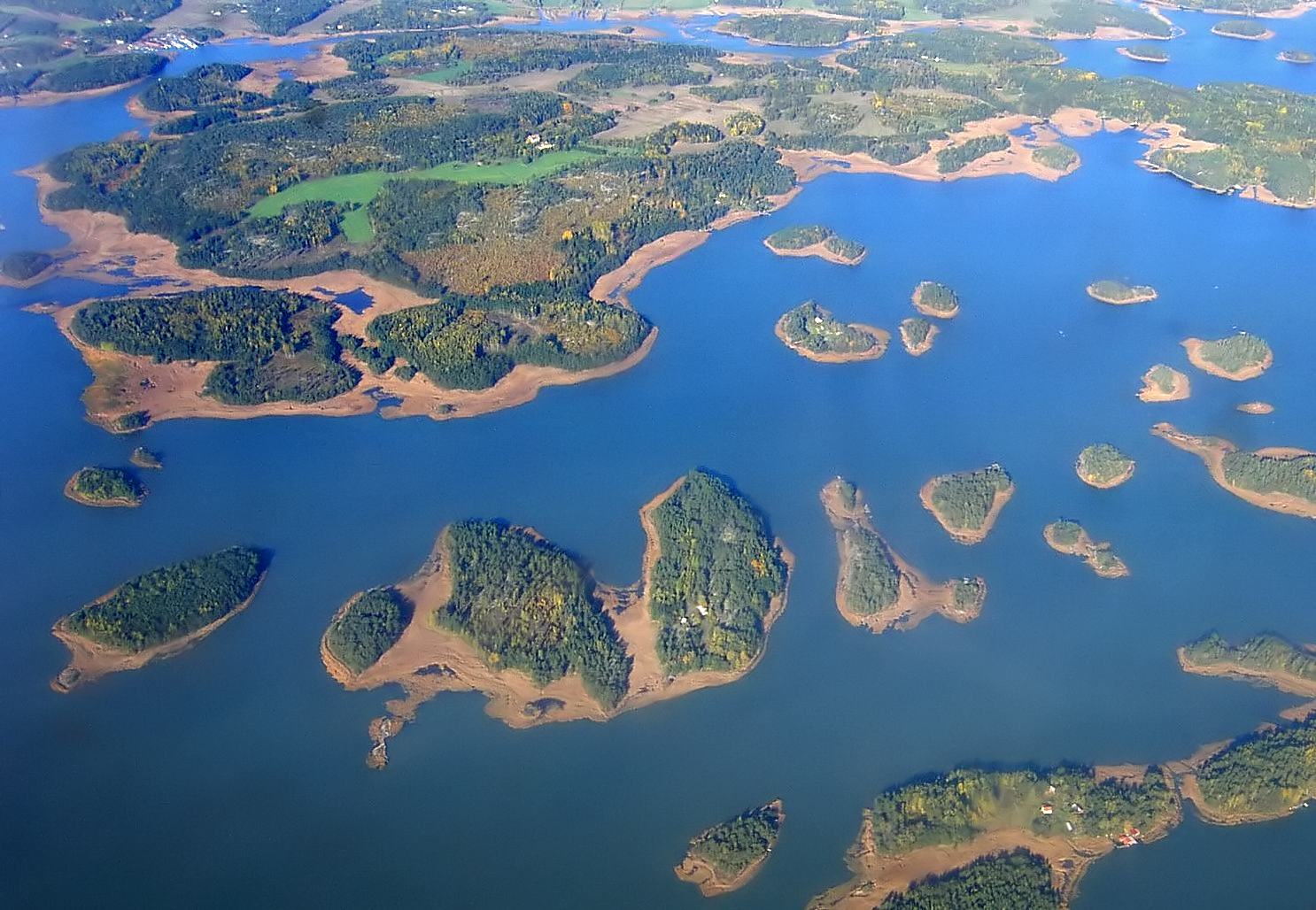
The inner archipelago is wooded. Picture taken in autumn, when reeds surrounding the islands have turned brown.

The Archipelago Sea covers a roughly triangular area with the cities of Mariehamn, Uusikaupunki, and Hanko at the corners. The archipelago can be divided into inner and outer archipelagos, with the outer archipelago consisting mainly of smaller, uninhabited islands. The total surface area is 8,300 square kilometres (3,205 square miles), of which 2,000 square kilometres (772 square miles) is land.

The archipelago has a very large number of islands. The exact number depends on the definition of the term "island", as the size of the patches of dry land in the area varies from small rocks peeking out of the water to large islands with several villages or even small towns. The number of the larger islands of over 1 square kilometre (0.4 sq mi) within the Archipelago Sea (in provinces of Åland Isles and Southwest Finland) is 257, whilst the number of smaller isles of over 0.5 hectares (1.2 acres) is about 17,700. If the number of smallest uninhabitable rocks and skerries is accounted, 50,000 is probably a good estimate. In comparison, the number of islands in the Canadian Arctic Archipelago is 36,563. Indonesia has 17,508 islands, according to the Indonesian Naval Hydro-Oceanographic Office. The Philippines has 7,641 islands.

The islands began emerging from the sea shortly after the last ice age. Due to the post-glacial rebound the process is still going on, with new skerries and islands being slowly created and old ones enlarged or merged. The current rate of rebound is between 4 and 10 millimetres (¼" to ½") a year. Because the islands are made of mainly granite and gneiss, two very hard types of rock, erosion is significantly slower than rebound. However, due to its southern location, the effect of postglacial rebound is smaller than – for example – in Kvarken (Finnish: Merenkurkku) further north.

The sea area is shallow, with a mean depth of 23 metres (75 ft). Most of the channels are not navigable for large ships.

There are three crater-like formations in the archipelago. One of them, Lumparn in Åland, is a genuine impact crater. The two other formations are intrusions. The more prominent of these is the Åva Intrusion in the municipality of Brändö, which is visible in satellite photos and high-resolution maps. The other similar formation is in Fjälskär, between the main islands of Houtskär and Iniö.

== Administration ==
The islands are divided between the region of Southwest Finland and the autonomous region of Åland. The border between the regions runs roughly along the Skiftet (Kihti in Finnish), a relatively open sea area. Together with the islands near the coast of Sweden the area forms a Euroregion. The main ports in the area are Turku on the continent, and Mariehamn on Åland.

=== Åland ===
The Åland region is autonomous and demilitarized. It has its own regional parliament and has Swedish as its sole official language. The regional parliament has power over wide-ranging matters, including health services, education, environment, and postal services. Monetary and foreign policy are handled by the Parliament of Finland. The president of Finland has, in theory, right to veto the laws passed by the Åland regional parliament.

=== Defence ===
The eastern part of the archipelago is defended by the Archipelago Sea Naval Command, which has its main base in Turku. The defence is based largely on naval mines and coastal artillery. Both are effective in the archipelago, where the dense clusters of islands severely limit the manoeuvrability of invading vessels. The autonomous region of Åland is demilitarised. The Finnish Defence Forces are not allowed to enter the territory of Åland in peacetime (in times of war the FDF has the duty of defending Åland due to international treaties starting from the Åland crisis which resulted in Finland securing possession of the islands while becoming obliged to protect the islands' neutrality), and its residents are exempt from military service, although they can volunteer to serve in the army.

=== Municipalities ===
The archipelago is divided into 30 municipalities, grouped in the autonomous region of Åland and in the historical provinces of Varsinais-Suomi and Uusimaa. The municipalities in Åland tend to be quite small, with the municipality of Sottunga having only approximately 100 residents.

Island municipalities in Varsinais-Suomi:

- Kimitoön (Dragsfjärd, Hitis, Kimito, Västanfjärd)
- Kustavi
- Pargas (Houtskär, Iniö, Korpo, Nagu)

Coastal municipalities in Varsinais-Suomi which also include some islands:

- Kaarina (Kuusisto)
- Masku
- Naantali (Merimasku, Rymättylä, Velkua)
- Pyhäranta
- Salo (Angelniemi, Särkisalo)
- Sauvo (Karuna)
- Taivassalo
- Turku (Kakskerta, Ruissalo, Hirvensalo, Satava)
- Uusikaupunki (Lokalahti, Pyhämaa)

Island municipalities in Åland:

- Brändö
- Eckerö
- Finström
- Föglö
- Geta
- Hammarland
- Jomala
- Kumlinge
- Kökar
- Lemland
- Lumparland
- Mariehamn
- Saltvik
- Sottunga
- Sund
- Vårdö

Coastal municipalities in Uusimaa which also include some islands:

- Hanko
- Raseborg (Bromarv)

The archipelago continues further to the east in Uusimaa, but Hanko is traditionally seen as a dividing point between the Archipelago Sea and the Gulf of Finland.

== Demographics ==
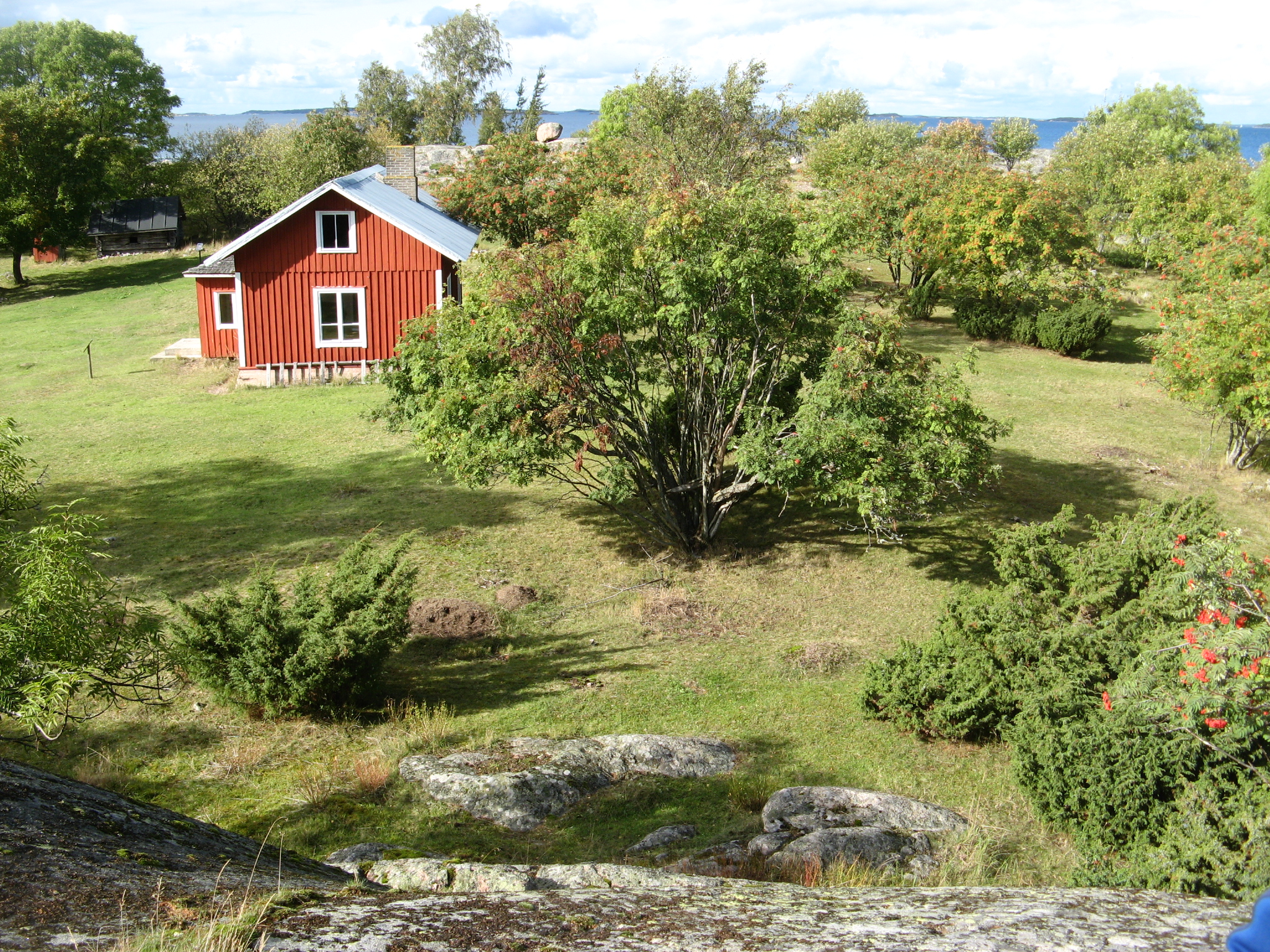
The minor inhabited island groups could sustain only one or a few families and only with fish as the main source of income. Kråkskär was inhabited until 1956.

The number of permanent residents on the islands is roughly 60,000, with 27,000 of them living in Åland. Also outside Åland most of the area has been more or less monolingually Swedish-speaking, now officially bilingual with a Swedish-speaking majority. The northern part of the area is monolingually Finnish-speaking.

Throughout its history the population of the Archipelago Sea has varied significantly. The population increased until the first half of the 16th century. After that the population went into decline as the carrying capacity of the environment was reached and wars and pestilence took their toll on the people. In the 19th century the population increased sharply as new, more efficient fishing methods were introduced. In the 20th century the population went into decline again, especially on smaller islands, due to rapid urbanization. Many smaller islands became completely uninhabited. During the recent decades increasing number of summer residences in the archipelago have revitalized some areas.

Many Finns have summer residences on the islands in the area, known for its natural beauty. Due to this the population of many islands can double or more during the summer. Although having a summer cottage in the archipelago is more common among the Swedish-speaking, the Swedish-speaking are a small minority on the mainland, and so most summer residents are Finnish-speaking, in contrast to the permanent residents. Kultaranta, the official summer residence of the president of Finland is on the island of Luonnonmaa in Naantali.

An anomalous feature in the demographics in the archipelago is the number of twins. The tendency for non-identical twin births is partly hereditary, and the necessary genes are prevalent in the archipelago. In the 18th and 19th centuries the proportion of twin births was greater than anywhere in Europe, and enormously higher than in continental Finland. The reason for this was fishing. Fish is an excellent source of protein and unsaturated fat. It was also available even when crops failed. Hence having twins maximizes lifetime reproductive success.

== Economy and communications ==
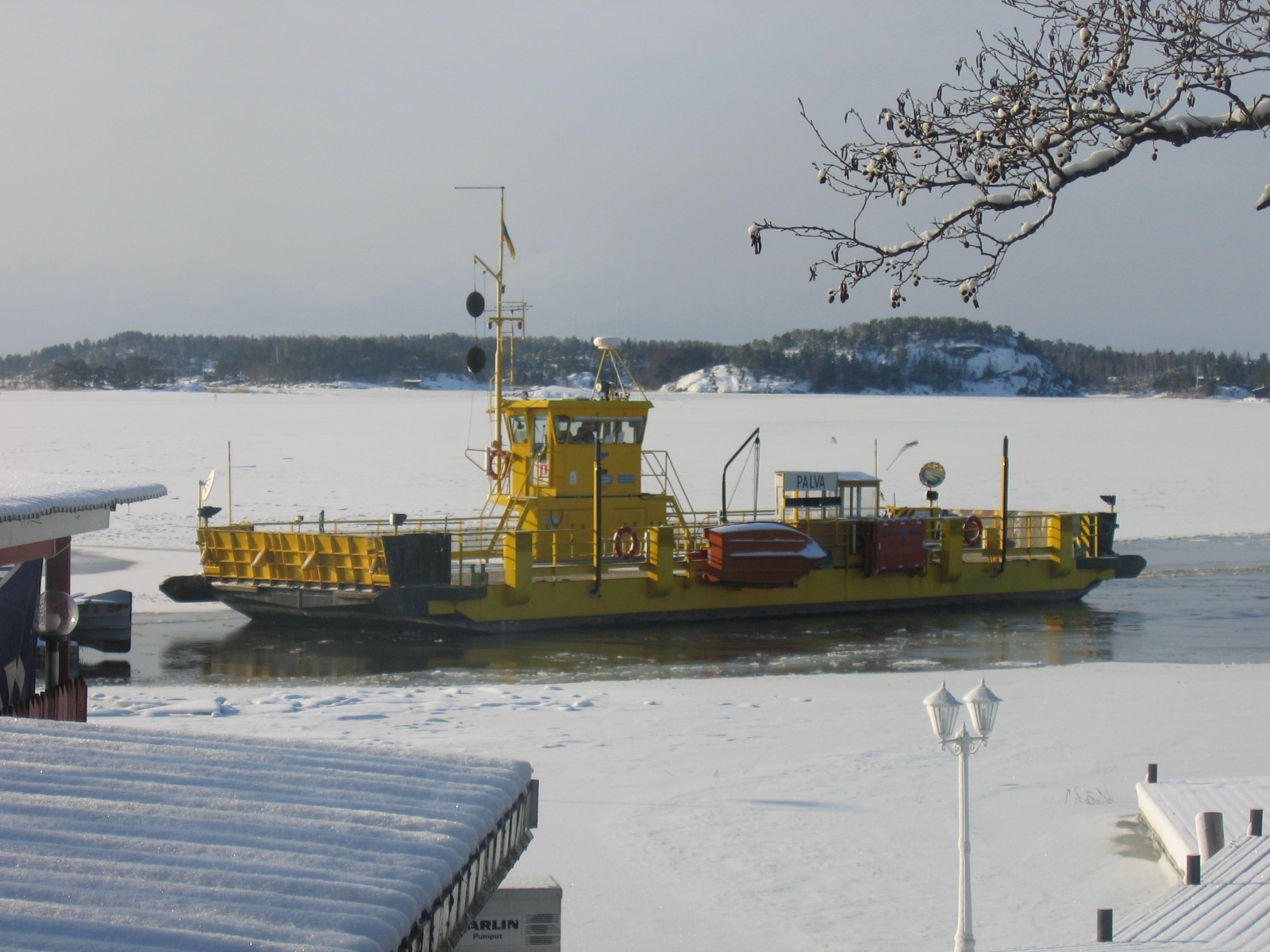
A cable ferry in winter

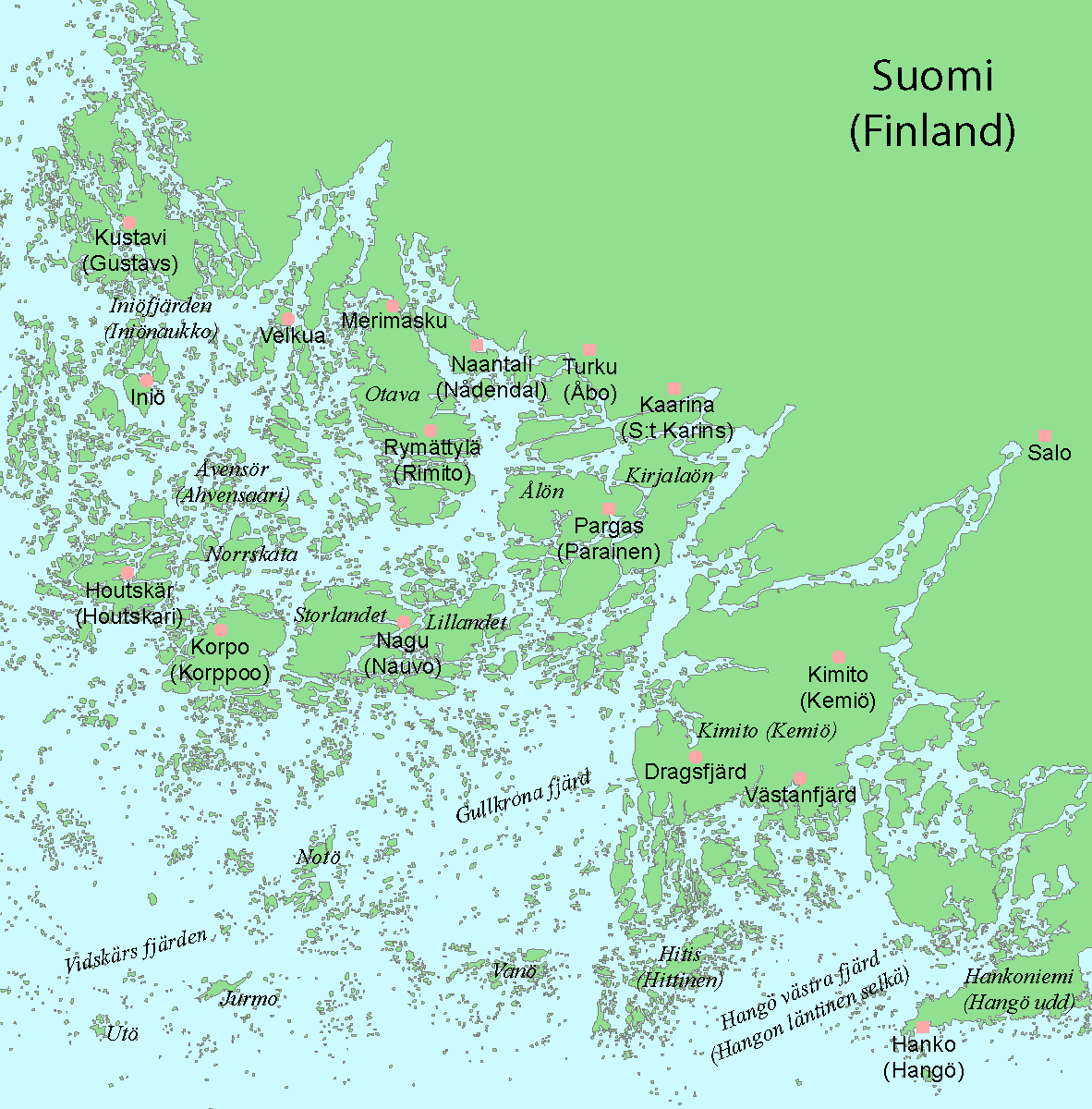
Map of the Archipelago Sea east of Åland

The islands generally enjoy a high standard of living comparable to that of continental Finland. Fishing and fish processing are major industries. The archipelago is well known for its Baltic herring and rainbow trout products. Agriculture is limited by the small size and rocky nature of the islands. However, the climate is more favourable than in continental Finland and some islands, particularly Rymättylä, are famous in the nearby continental areas for producing the first new potatoes of the summer. The significance of tourism to the economy of the islands is constantly increasing.

The islands are linked by bridges and ferries, and in case of Åland, a small airport. The ferries are divided into two categories: "road ferries" (landsvägsfärja or simply färja in Swedish, lautta or lossi in Finnish) are free of charge and operate mostly on short routes between adjacent (large) islands. They are raft-like in construction and usually operated by the road administration. The small ones are cable ferries (kabelfärja in Swedish, lossi in Finnish), bigger ones do not use cables (and are called lautta in Finnish). The other ferries (förbindelsefartyg in Swedish, yhteysalus in Finnish) are more ship-like in construction, are operated by the maritime administration and may charge a small fee. They operate on longer routes covering several smaller or more distant islands. There are also large commercially operated cruiseferries connecting the Finnish cities of Turku and Helsinki to Åland and Sweden.

During cold winters official ice roads are established between some islands. It is also common to drive on ice to islands lacking official ice roads. This greatly eases transportation, as it makes it possible to simply drive a car (or even a heavy van if ice is very thick, usually every few years) from the continent to the islands. On the other hand, during spring and autumn there is a period of thaw (menföre in Swedish, kelirikko in Finnish) when the ice is too weak even for walking, but too thick for boating. This can leave some islands lacking a pier for large ships isolated for days or weeks. Access is only by hydrocopter, hovercraft or helicopter.

Many important shipping lanes cross the Archipelago Sea. Navigation is made hazardous by the labyrinthine archipelago, varying depth and numerous skerries. For this reason the islands are dotted with lighthouses of varying sizes and navigational marks. Maritime pilot services are maintained by the state.

=== Archipelago Ring Road ===
The most inhabited islands in the eastern archipelago in Southwest Finland are connected by the Archipelago Ring Road. There are approximately 160 to 190 kilometres (99–118 miles) of public roads and 30 to 50 kilometres (19–31 miles) of waterways along the Ring Road. The city of Turku is usually considered the starting point of the road. The route goes through following municipalities, villages, islands and island groups:

1. Turku
2. Raisio
3. Naantali
4. Merimasku
5. Askainen
6. Mietoinen
7. Taivassalo
8. Kustavi
9. Iniö
10. Houtskär
11. Korpo
12. Nagu
13. Pargas
14. Kaarina
15. Turku

There is also a shorter version of the route, the so-called "Small Ring Road", which utilizes a ferry connection between Rymättylä (part of Naantali) and Nagu, skipping numbers 4–11 in the list above. The length of the "Small Ring Road" is approximately 125 km (78 mi).

The ring road is usually traveled by car or by bicycle. Most of the ferries along the road are free, but ferries between Houtskär and Iniö charge a small fee. It is possible to cover the Ring Road in one day by car, but usually travellers spend at least one night along the way. Approximately 20 000 tourist travel the Ring Road every year. The main tourist season is from June to August. The principal tourist attraction is scenery and nature along the way, but significant sights also include the Louhisaari manor and several medieval churches.

== Culture ==
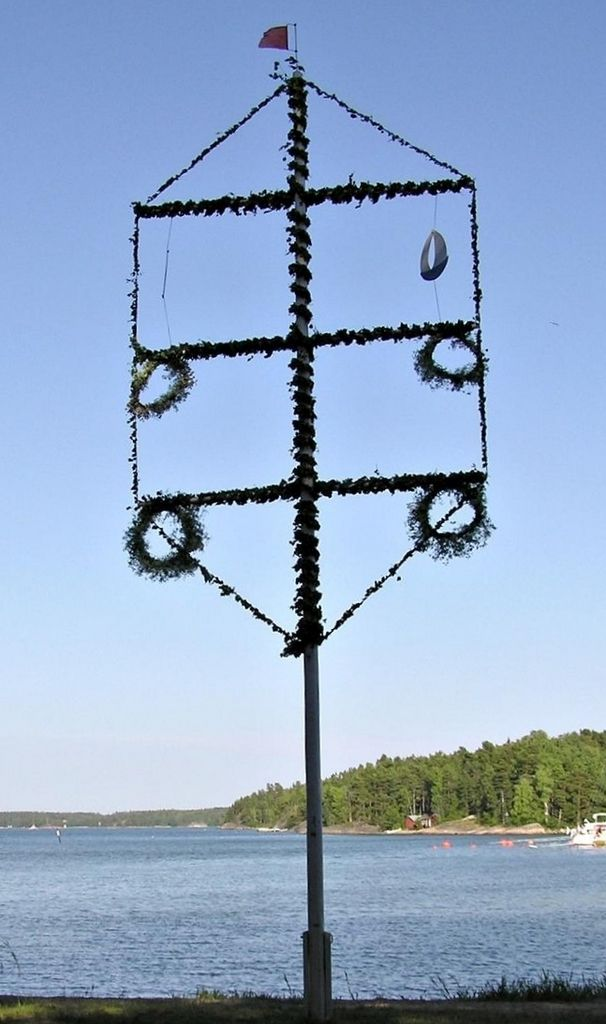
A maypole in Nagu

The culture of the archipelago resembles that of the Swedish-speaking coastal areas of Finland. Many features of typically Finnish culture, such as the popularity of sauna, have become ingrained in the culture of the islands. There are, however, several subtle differences. Maypoles are an essential part of the Midsummer festival in the archipelago but not in continental Finland. On the other hand, the continental Finnish Midsummer tradition of lighting bonfires has been introduced to the archipelago relatively recently.

Based on the languages spoken the archipelago can be divided into three parts. The Åland archipelago in the west is almost completely Swedish-speaking, the Åboland archipelago in the south is mostly Swedish-speaking, and the northern archipelago is Finnish-speaking.

Because Christianity spread to the islands before the mainland, the churches on the major islands tend to be relatively old; dating from the 13th, 14th, and 15th centuries, with the oldest ones in Åland. More than 80% of Finns are members of the Evangelical Lutheran Church of Finland, and this proportion is even higher in the archipelago, as the area doesn't have an orthodox or catholic parish.

The culinary culture of the archipelago resembles continental Finnish cuisine. Naturally, there is a greater emphasis on fish, particularly baltic herring, salmon and rainbow trout. The island are also famous for traditional dark bread distinguished by the use of buttermilk, syrup, and malt among the ingredients. The main dish of the Christmas dinner is usually a northern pike, in contrast to the ham which is eaten in mainland Finland. Every Christmas the fishermen of Korpo deliver a pike for the president's table.

== Nature and conservation ==
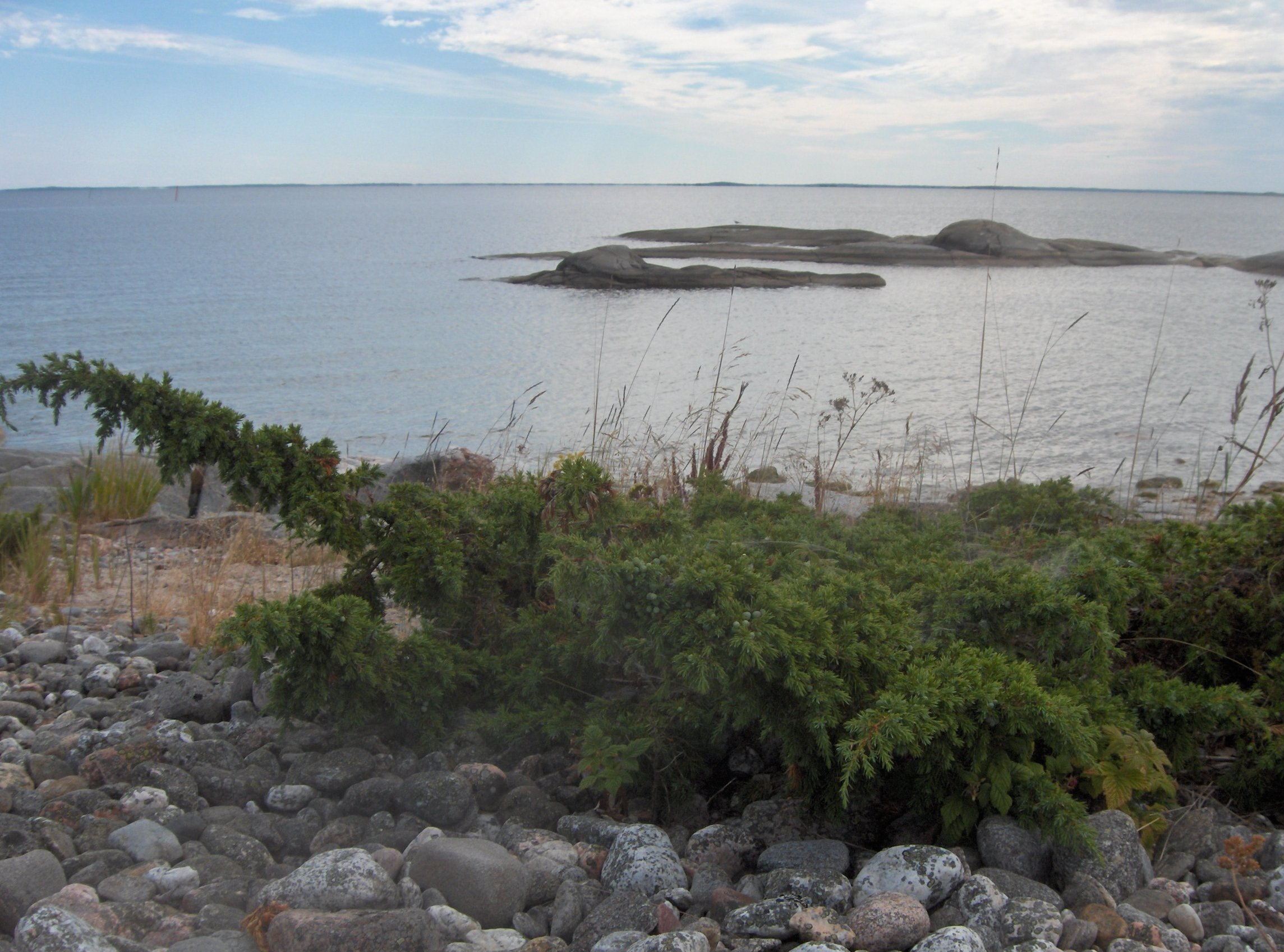
A juniper (Juniperus communis) growing in the archipelago. Due to harsh conditions it is only about 15 cm (6 in) in height.

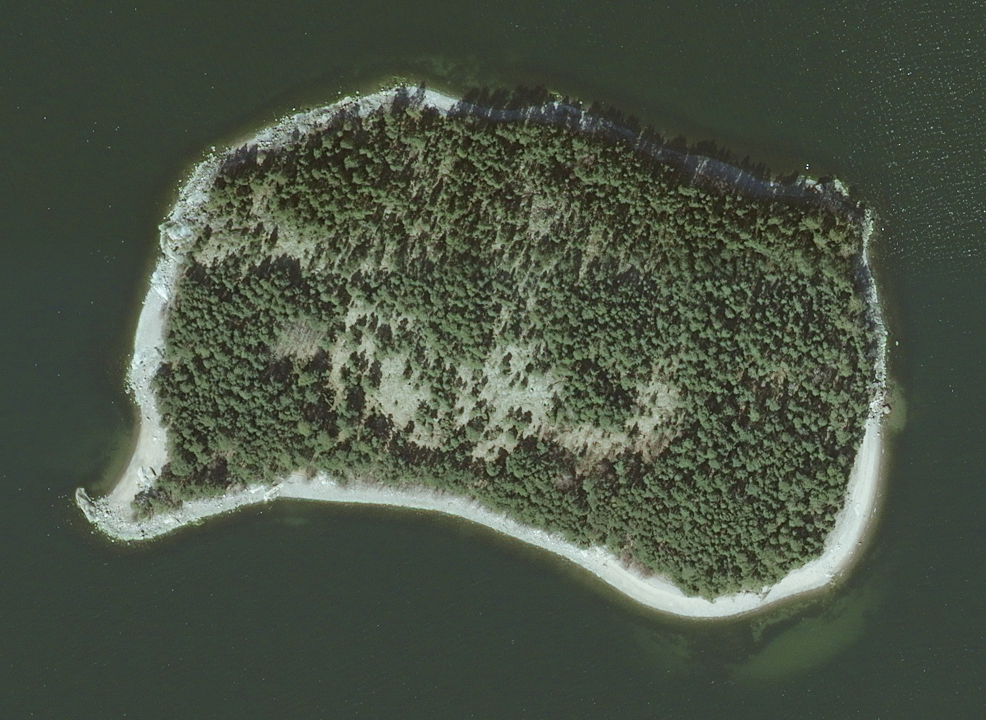
An aerial photography of the Omenainen island of Nagu

The islands provide a unique and diverse environment for wildlife. The bigger islands resemble the coastal regions of continental Finland whereas skerries have a radically different environment. Smaller islands are devoid of trees, but still harbour a rich plantlife. The environment is sunny, has a relatively long growing season and is fertilised by guano. On the other hand, nearly constant wind and thin or non-existent soil limit plant growth. The very low salinity of the Baltic Sea makes splashes of seawater more benign for plant life. While most of the islands are rocky, some are actually extensions of the Salpausselkä ridge system, and thus composed of terminal moraine. Such islands include Örö and Jurmo. The flora and fauna in these islands is more diverse than in their rocky neighbours.

The conditions can vary radically even within one small island, due to the features of the rock on which the islands are based. There may be small patches of fresh-water bogs, ponds of fresh water, ponds of brackish water, bushes, meadows, barren rocks, wind-beaten shores and sheltered coves on an island only a few tens of meters in diameter. Many plants have altered phenotypes due to the environment. For example, junipers on small islands grow only to a height less than 0.5 metres (1.6 feet), but can cover several square meters.

In contrast to the terrestrial and coastal ecosystems of the islands, the sea itself has a relatively low biodiversity. The reason for this is the brackish nature of the water. The salinity is only 0.6% in the Archipelago. The salinity has also varied greatly during the past, making it difficult for species to adapt. However, the great number of individuals indicates a favourable environment. Typical fish species are the Baltic herring, pike, white-fish, perch and flounder.

The area is home to many species which are not found elsewhere in Finland. Harbour porpoise is one example of such species. It is the only cetacean which is regularly sighted in the northern part of the Baltic Sea. The current population in the entire Baltic is estimated at 600 individuals, down from estimated 10 to 20 thousand a century ago. Another example is white-tailed eagle, which has a significant breeding population in the Archipelago Sea. Rare or endangered bird and mammal species found in the archipelago also include Caspian tern, greater scaup, grey seal and ringed seal.

The islands are a haven for seabirds. Species include mute swan, black guillemot, great crested grebe and numerous species of gulls. Recently great cormorants have spread to the archipelago and their numbers are increasing. This not necessarily viewed as a good thing by nature lovers, since great cormorants live in dense colonies which will eventually poison surrounding plant life by their excrement.

The greatest threat to the environment is eutrophication caused mainly by agriculture and fish farms. This is a particular threat to the Baltic Sea, since it is very shallow and thus has much less potential to dilute effluent from human activities. Eutrophication has been partly brought under control in Finland, but the effects are masked by the general decline in the condition of the Baltic Sea.

Many areas of the archipelago are protected from human activity by their sheer inaccessibility. The southern part of the Archipelago Sea belong to the cooperation area of the Archipelago National Park and there are many small nature conservation areas, where landing is prohibited in spring and summer.

== History ==
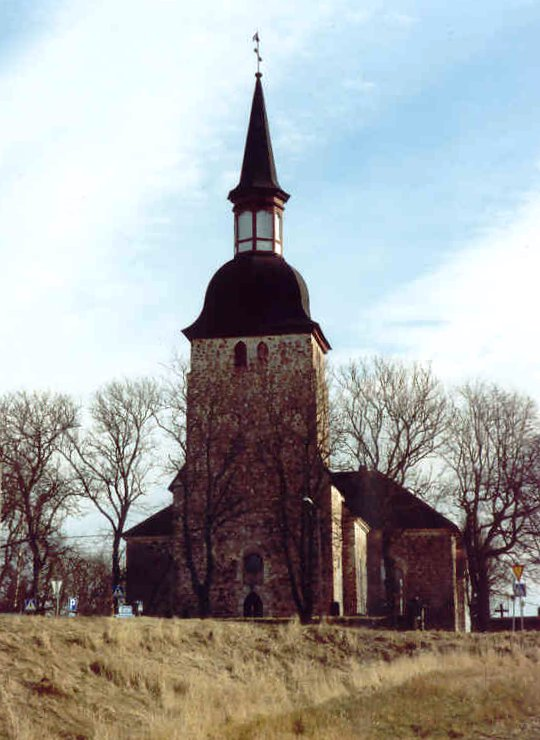
The church of Jomala dates from the 13th century, and is the oldest parish church in Finland.

=== Prehistory ===
The islands began rising from the water 10,000 years ago. At that stage the Danish Straits were closed and the current Baltic Sea was the fresh-water Lake Ancylus. The water around the islands turned from fresh to brackish around 7600 years ago as the saline water from the North Sea penetrated further to the Baltic from the recently opened straits. The oldest archaeological finds in Dragsfjärd date back to ca. 4000 BC and represent the Pit-Comb Ware culture. During that period the outer archipelago was formed by the highest points of the main islands of Houtskär, Korpo and Nagu. Due to post-glacial rebound the entire archipelago has risen approximately 25 metres (82 feet) since, enlarging existing islands and creating many more.

=== Swedish rule ===
During the 12th and 13th centuries Sweden established its control of the Archipelago Sea. At the same time Christianity started to spread to Finland, starting from the archipelago and the adjacent coastal area. The islands occupy a strategic position, guarding the approaches to Stockholm, Turku and the entire Gulf of Bothnia. Therefore, they were fortified by the Swedish Empire during the Middle Ages. A royal postal route used to go via the northern islands in the 16th and 17th century.

According to legend, the notorious pirates known as the Victual Brothers, who terrorized the Baltic Sea region in the Middle Ages, would have lit stray fires in the Archipelago Sea, which would have lured other ships to shore, looted the booty and possibly killed the ship's crew. This is apparently just a later story tradition. According to the same tradition, the pirates were also joined by young adventurous men from coastal villages who did not see a future for themselves in their home region.

In 1808 the War of Finland broke out between Sweden and Russia. In April Russian troops occupied the archipelago, including Åland. Soon after the local residents, enraged by the confiscation of ships, rebelled. Aided by troops from Sweden the archipelago was cleared of Russian troops in May. The Swedish troops then used the islands as a staging area for the recapture of continental Finland. The archipelago remained in Swedish control until the end of the war, but in the subsequent Treaty of Fredrikshamn in 1809 Sweden was forced to cede the area along with the rest of Finland. The Archipelago Sea became part of the autonomous Grand Duchy of Finland under the Russian Empire.

=== Grand Duchy of Finland ===
During the Crimean War an Anglo-French force attacked and destroyed the Bomarsund castle. In the Åland convention of 1856 the Åland side of the archipelago was demilitarised. The Russians moved troops back into the area in 1916, and for the next 5 years there was either Russian or Finnish military presence in Åland.

=== Independent Finland ===
Finland gained its independence from Russia in 1917. Shortly after, the Swedish speaking inhabitants of Åland, in the western part of the Archipelago, appealed to Sweden to annex the islands. The request received mixed support in Sweden, but led to the Åland crisis. The League of Nations was called in to resolve the situation, and in 1921 the League granted the sovereignty of the entire archipelago to Finland, despite the objections of the majority of Ålanders. However, Åland was given a wide autonomy, and its demilitarised status was reaffirmed.

In 1939 the Soviet Union attacked Finland in the Winter War. At the end of the war in 1940 Finland was forced to rent Hanko at the eastern extreme of the Archipelago Sea to Soviet Union as a military base. In 1941 the Continuation War broke out. Finland sent troops to Åland to guard against a possible Soviet invasion, which didn't materialize. The Finnish army also laid siege on Hanko, which was evacuated by the Soviet Union later that year. Finnish troops remained in Åland until the end of the war in 1944.

In 1995 Finland became a member of the European Union. The referendum on the membership was held separately in Åland, leading to the possibility of different outcomes. A rejection of the EU membership by the Ålanders would have created a situation similar to that of Greenland, which is an autonomous region of Denmark but is not part of the EU. However, the membership was accepted in both referendums.

== Image gallery ==
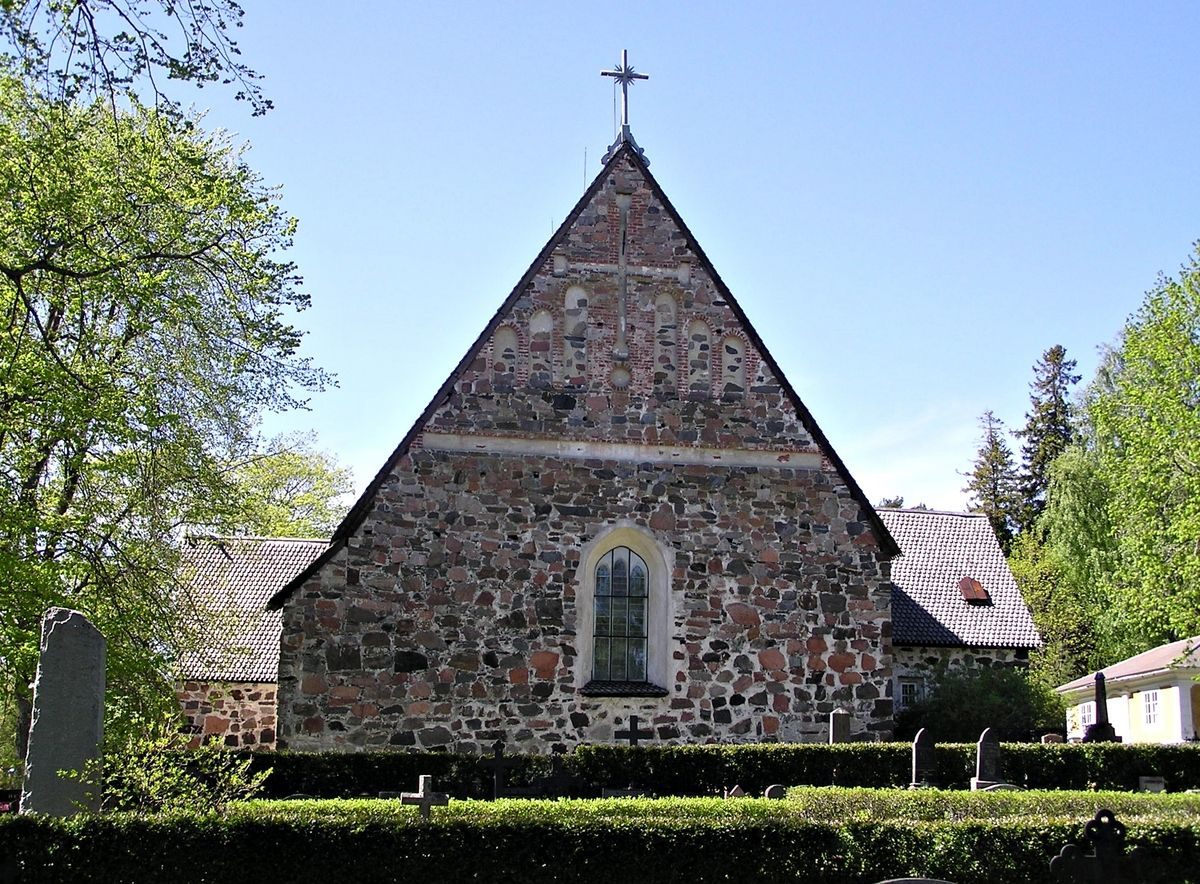
Nagu church dating from the 15th century

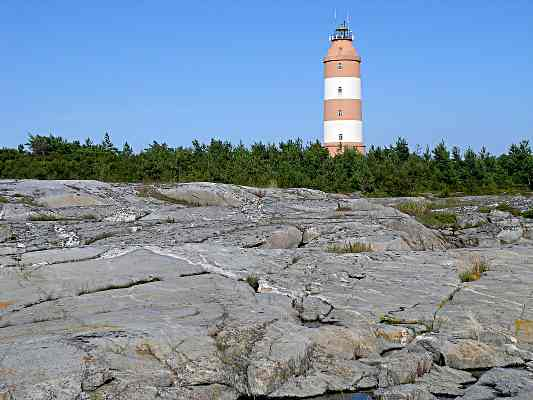
The Isokari lighthouse in Kustavi

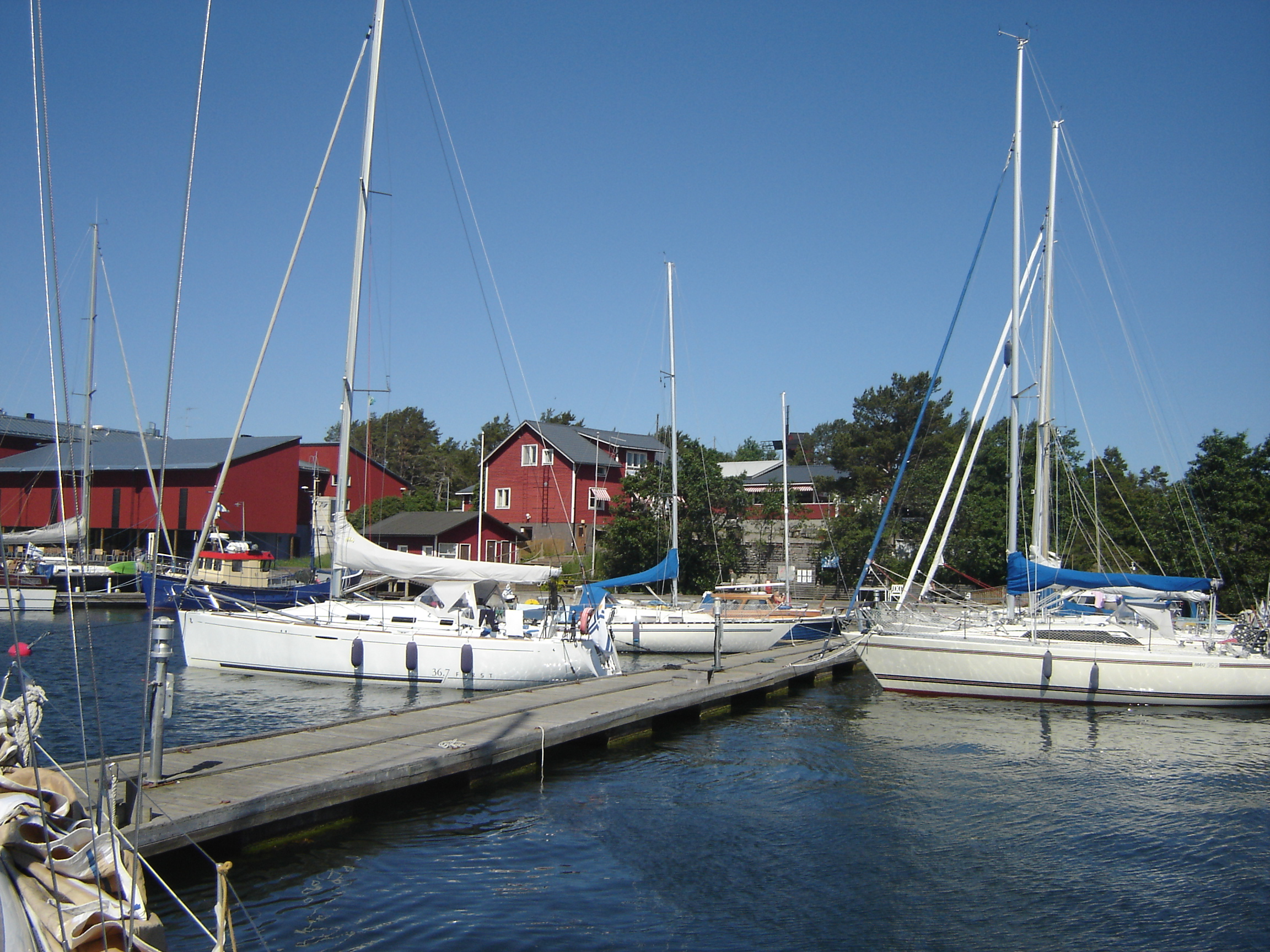
Marina in Korpo

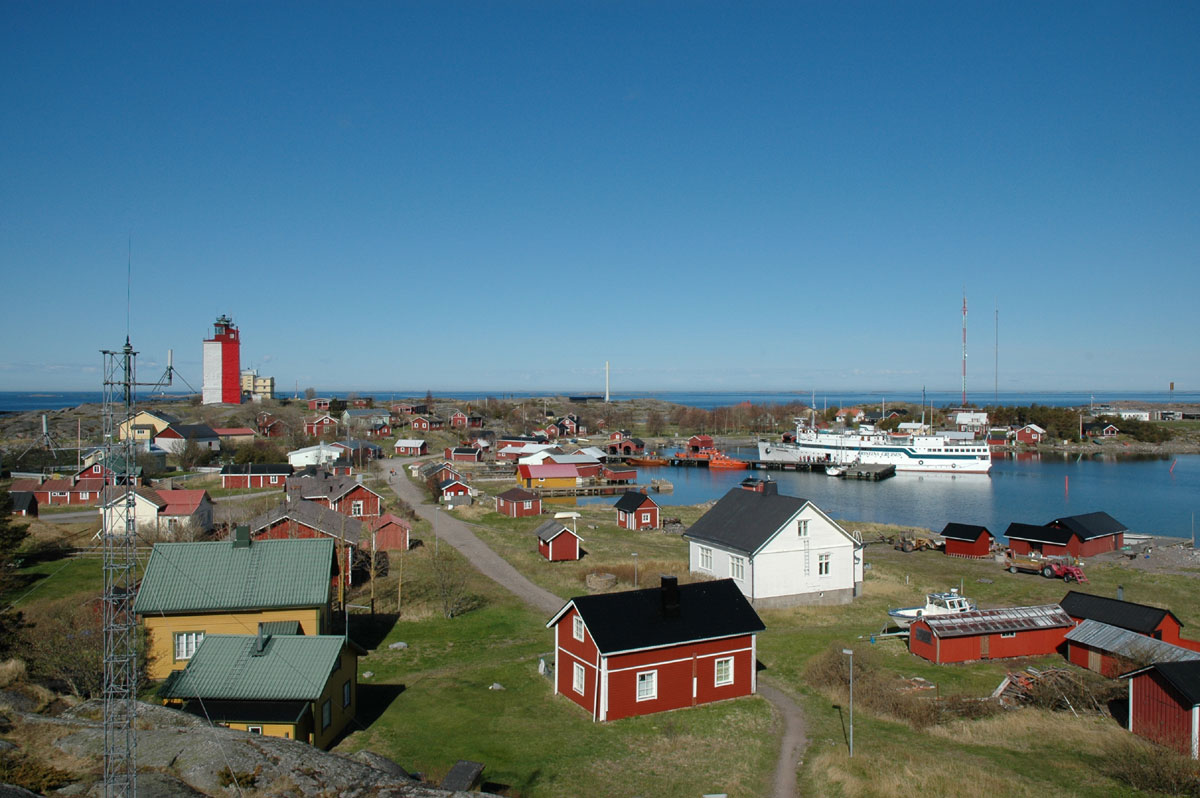
The Utö Island of the Pargas municipality

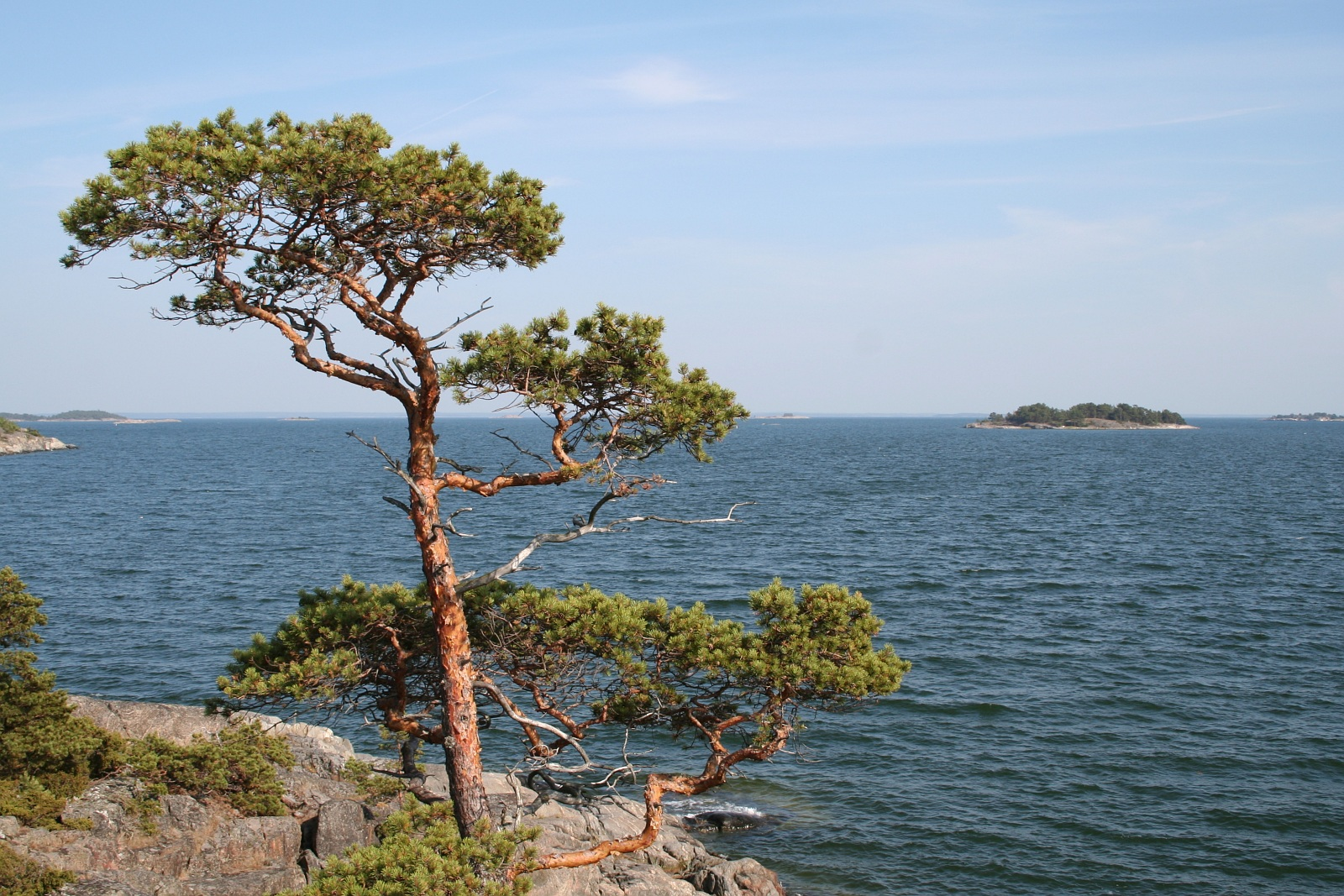
Rocky islets of the outer archipelago in Gullkrona

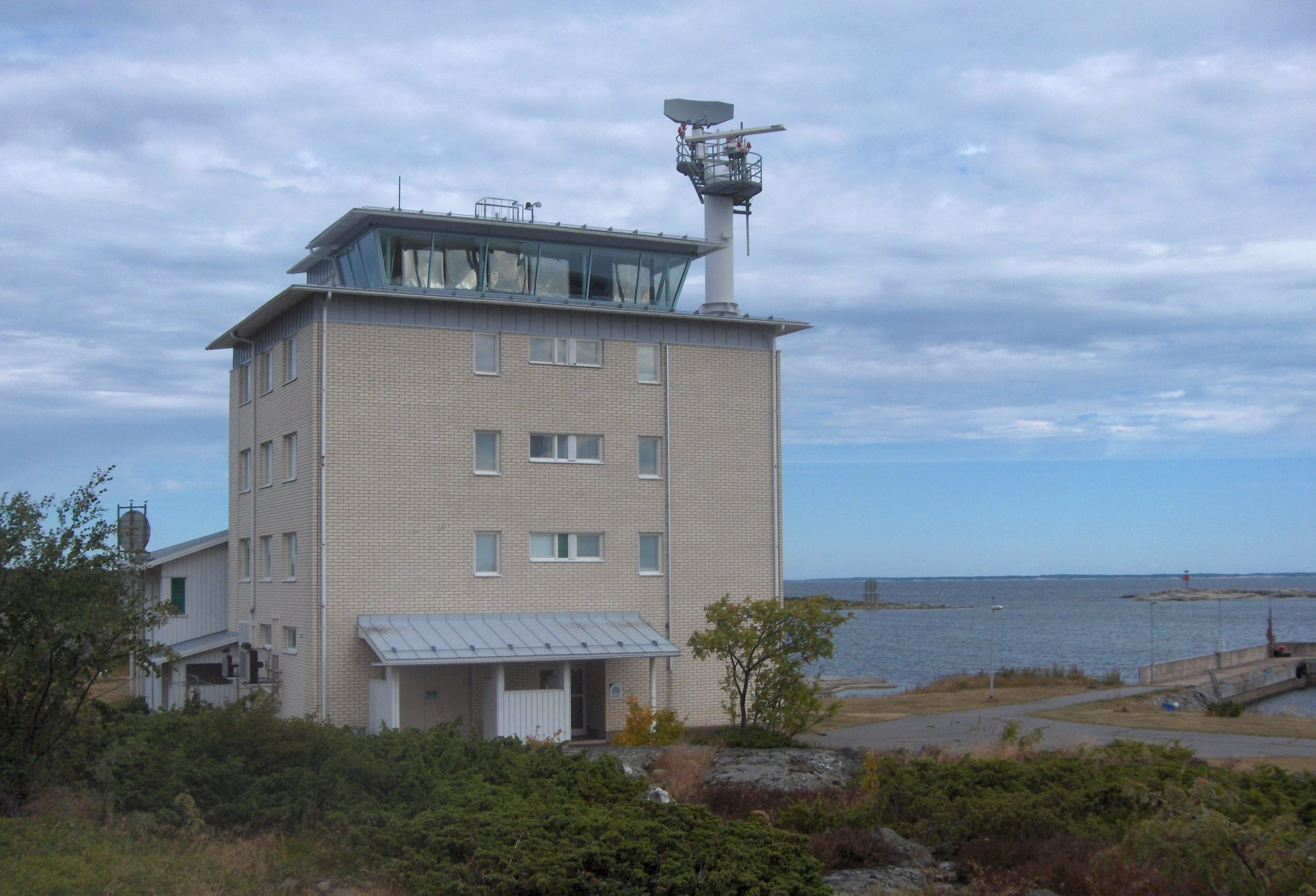
Isokari maritime pilot station, responsible for guiding ships to the harbour of Uusikaupunki.

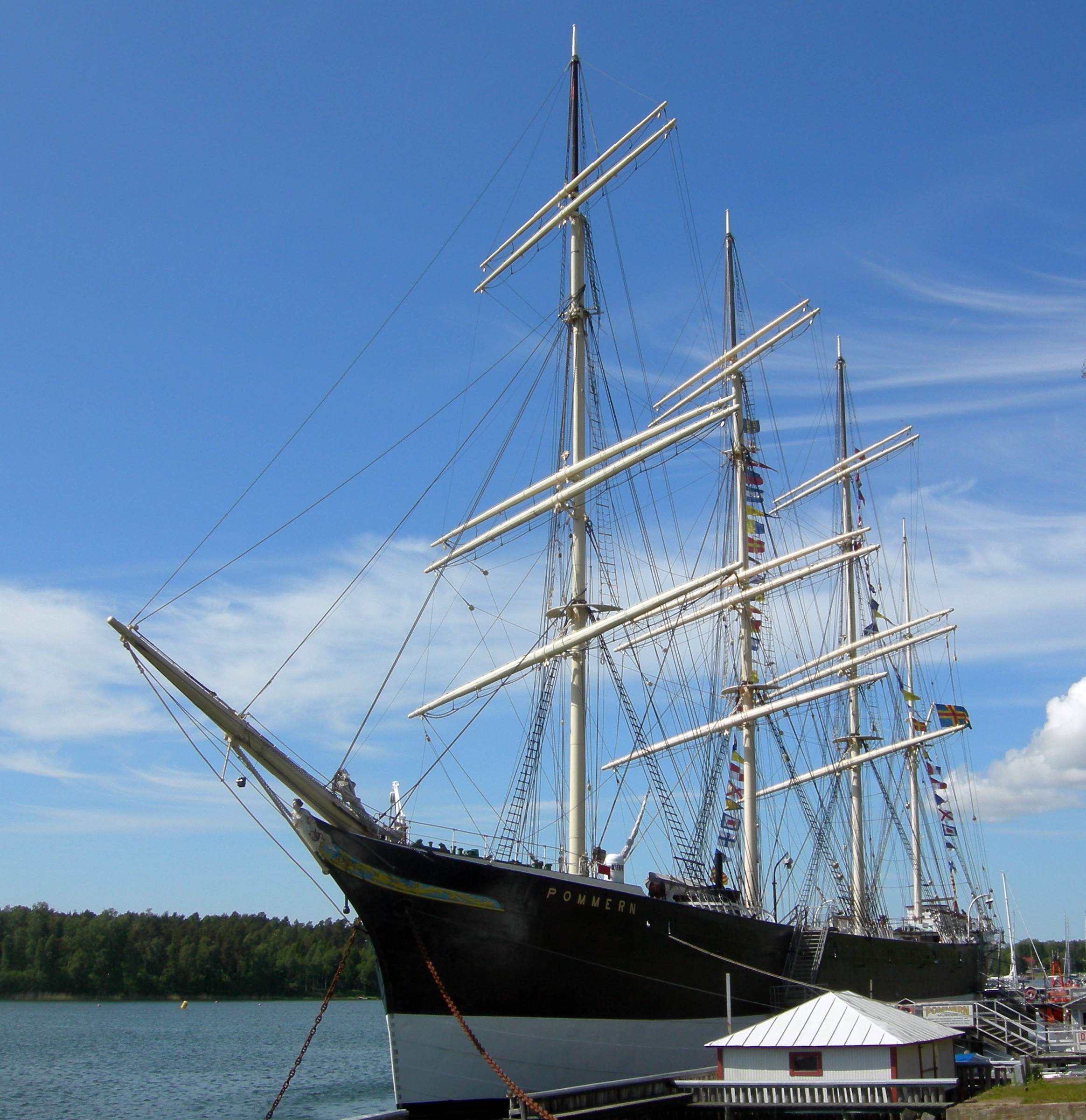
Museum ship Pommern in Mariehamn

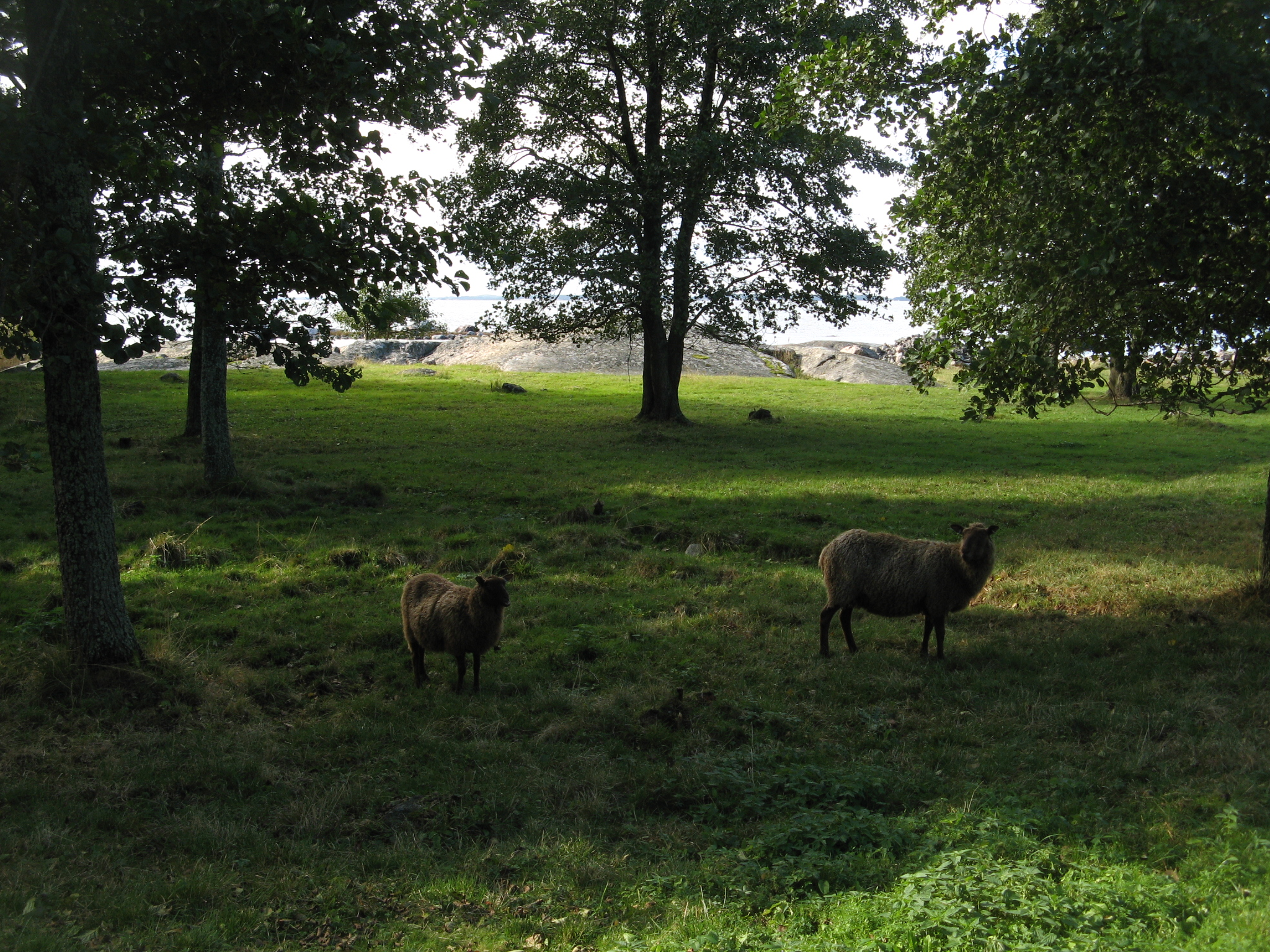
Sheep and cattle are keeping the landscape open in the national park

== See also ==
- Geography of Finland
- Islands of Turku
