= Säckilot =

Finnish island

Coordinates: 60.279491°N 21.765115°E

Säckilot (Finnish: Säkkiluoto) is an island located in Southwest Finland, Finland. The island contains nine piers and a helipad. The island is part of an archipelago administered from Pargas.

== History ==
The island is reportedly owned by a 54-year-old Russian businessman from St. Petersburg named Pavel Melnikov. On September 22, 2018, more than 400 Finnish police and military officials raided the island. There is speculation that Melnikov secretly works for the Russian military owing to the "helipads, multiple docks, barrack-like structures and location near Finnish military facilities".
