= Pargas (former municipality) =

Pargas Pargas – Parainen
- Former town
- Pargas stad Paraisten kaupunki
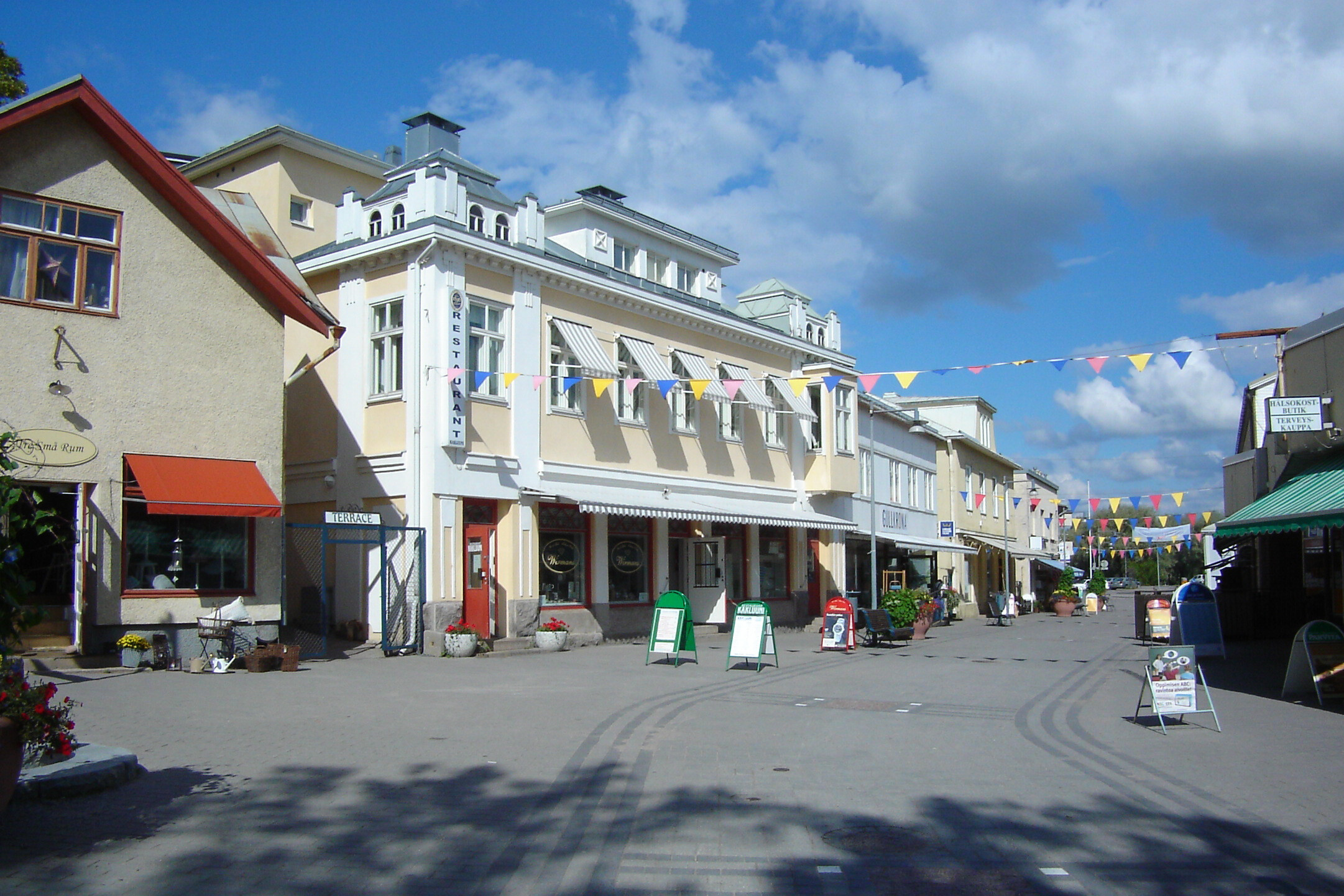

- Coat of arms

- Location of Pargas in Finland
- Coordinates: 60°18′N 022°18′E
- Country: Finland
- Region: Southwest Finland
- Sub-region: Åboland
- Charter: 1948
- Town privileges: 1977
- Consolidated: 2009

Government
  - City manager: Folke Öhman

Area
  - Total: 476.73 km^{2} (184.07 sq mi)
  - Land: 273.18 km^{2} (105.48 sq mi)
  - Water: 203.55 km^{2} (78.59 sq mi)

Population (2008-12-31)
  - Total: 12,266
  - Density: 44.901/km^{2} (116.29/sq mi)

Population by native language
  - Finnish: 45% (official)
  - Swedish: 54% (official)
- Time zone: UTC+2 (EET)
  - Summer (DST): UTC+3 (EEST)

Pargas (Finland Swedish: [ˈpɑrːɡɑs]; Finnish: Parainen, pronounced [ˈpɑrɑi̯nen]) is a former town and municipality in south-western Finland. On 1 January 2009, it was consolidated with Houtskär, Iniö, Korpo and Nagu to form the new municipality of Väståboland (since renamed to Pargas).

It is known as the "capital" of the archipelago of Turku and had been called a town since 1977. It is located in the province of Western Finland and is part of the Southwest Finland region. The town had a population of 12,266 (as of 31 December 2008) and covered a land area of 273.18 square kilometres (105.48 sq mi). The population density was 44.9 inhabitants per square kilometre (116/sq mi).

The municipality was bilingual, with the majority (54%) being Swedish and the minority (45%) Finnish speakers.

The city has many little suburbs around it, including Kirjala and Lielax.

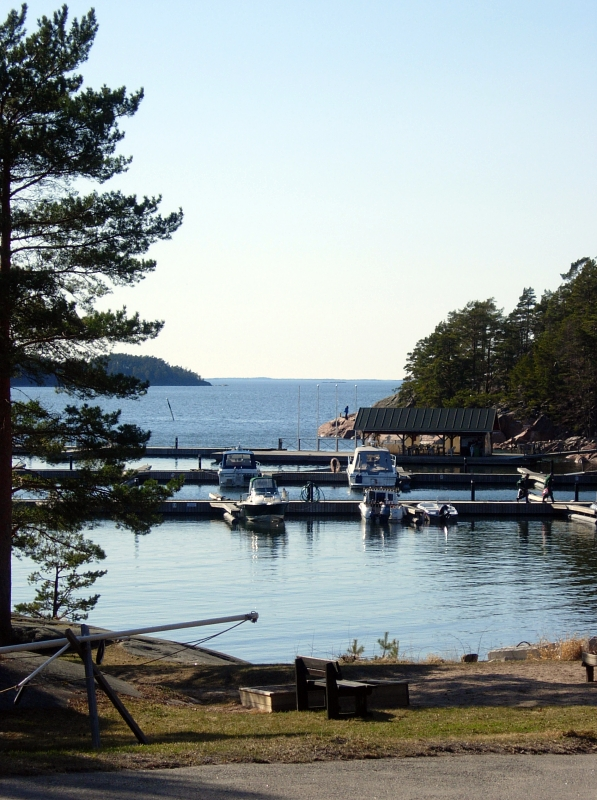
View from Airisto harbour, Stormälö

== International relations ==
=== Twin towns — Sister cities ===
The sister cities of Pargas are

- Haninge, Sweden
- Ulstein, Norway
- Chudovo, Russia
- Kärdla, Estonia
