= Pargas =

Town and municipality of Finland

Pargas Pargas – Parainen
- Town
- Pargas stad Paraisten kaupunki
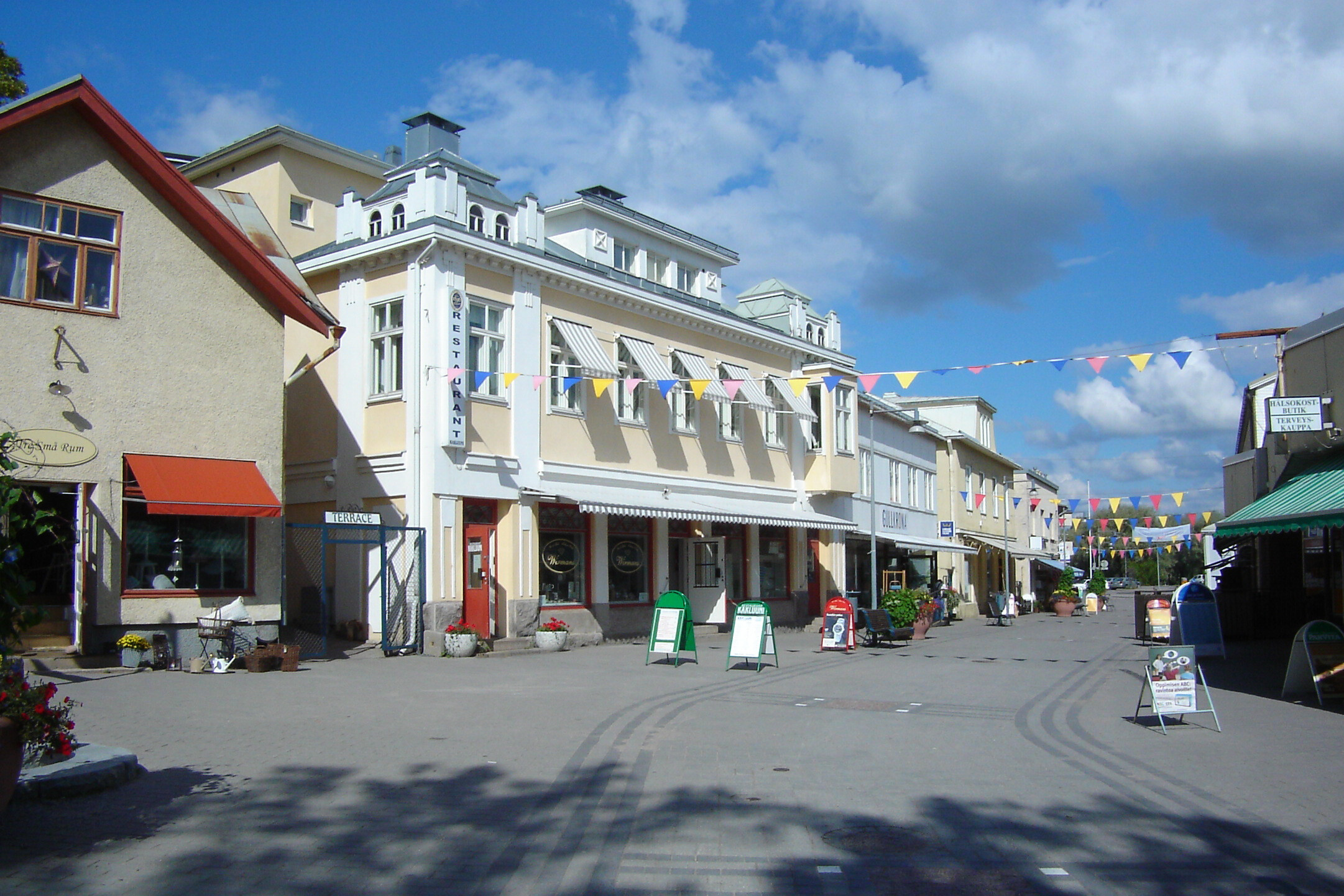
- The city centre of Pargas

- Coat of arms

- Location of Pargas in Finland
- Interactive map of Pargas
- Coordinates: 60°18′N 022°18′E
- Country: Finland
- Region: Southwest Finland
- Sub-region: Åboland
- Charter: 2009
- Seat: Pargas

Government
  - Town manager: Tom Simola

Area (2018-01-01)
  - Total: 5,548.17 km^{2} (2,142.16 sq mi)
  - Land: 883.98 km^{2} (341.31 sq mi)
  - Water: 4,666.46 km^{2} (1,801.73 sq mi)
  - Rank: 88th largest in Finland

Population (2025-12-31)
  - Total: 14,712
  - Rank: 76th largest in Finland
  - Density: 16.64/km^{2} (43.1/sq mi)

Population by native language
  - Swedish: 53.5% (official)
  - Finnish: 41.8% (official)
  - Others: 4.7%

Population by age
  - 0 to 14: 15.1%
  - 15 to 64: 56.7%
  - 65 or older: 28.1%
- Time zone: UTC+02:00 (EET)
  - Summer (DST): UTC+03:00 (EEST)
- Website: www.pargas.fi/en/

Pargas (Finnish: Parainen) is a town and municipality of Finland, in the Archipelago Sea, the biggest archipelago in the world by the number of islands, 50,000. The big limestone mine in Pargas is the base of the main industry and except for the central parts, the municipality is still mostly rural.

Pargas is located in Åboland in the province of Western Finland and is part of the Southwest Finland region. It was created as Väståboland on 1 January 2009 in Southwest Finland, when the municipalities of Pargas, Nagu, Korpo, Houtskär and Iniö were merged into a single municipality.

The municipality has a population of 14,712 (31 December 2025) and covers an area of 5,548.17 square kilometres (2,142.16 sq mi) of which 4,666.46 km^{2} (1,801.73 sq mi) is water. The population density is 16.64 inhabitants per square kilometre (43.1/sq mi).

Pargas is a bilingual municipality with Finnish and Swedish as its official languages. The population consists of 42% Finnish speakers, 53% Swedish speakers, and 5% speakers of other languages.

== Names ==
The town has a few nicknames, first one being 'Korvarnas land', 'Makkaroitten maa'. The word(s) korv, makkara means sausage. It traces back to at least the 1600's with earliest mention being by Peder Månsson/Petrus Magni Gyllenius, who says the name comes from the local peasants understanding of the local waterways they traversed, in his diary.

While another nickname for the town is 'Magerstaden', an swedish language name. Compound of mager+staden.

A third name, for the Pargas Malm is 'Malmen' or 'Malmi', from malm.

== Economy ==
Pargas has a large limestone industry, with the industry and Nordkalk as an important local employer, agriculture employs many in the rural regions of the municipality. Furthermore, the shipping industry is a relevant industry in the region. The municipality is suffering from high debt.

== History ==
Archaeological excavations revealed that the vikings used to travel to the archipelago in the 9th century.

Klaus Fleming was born at his family's holdings in Qvidjan, around 1535. He would become one of Swedens then strongest military strongmen and participate in the Cudgel War.

Karin Thomasdotter (1610–1697), who served as vogt in Pargas for over forty years, was one of the longest serving vogts, and also one of only two females to have the position in contemporary Finland.

In 1808 Battle of Rimito Kramp were fought just north of Pargas.

Partek Oyj Abp were founded in Pargas to build up the limestone industry, founded in 1898 with the company being sold to Kone in 2001.

Nagu were a site of battle in 1918 during the Finnish Civil War.

=== Population history ===
Population in Pargas from 1749 to 1845 ("Women, Men, Children, & Nobles") as gathered by Sven Gabriel Elmgren.

- 1749: 2872 persons
- 1760: 3069
- 1772: 3236
- 1780: 3129
- 1790: 3211
- 1800: 3589
- 1810: 3529
- 1820: 3420
- 1830: 3797
- 1840: 4263
- 1845: 4340

=== Recent history ===
On 1 January 2009, Pargas, Nagu, Korpo, Houtskär and Iniö merged to form the new municipality of Väståboland (Finnish: Länsi-Turunmaa).

==== Name dispute ====

Shortly after the merge, people started debating if the Väståboland name was the right name for the merged municipality; those arguing against the Väståboland name proposed Pargas as a 'new' name. The former municipalities could not agree on a new name, and Pargas insisted on a change, so the state had to step in and decided that the name would be Väståboland. The debates became heated and a referendum was arranged to decide what name the municipality should have in May 2011. The result of the referendum showed that 57.7% of the voters supported Pargas and 40.1% of voters supported Väståboland. Though the overall majority supported changing the name, there was an overwhelming support for the name Väståboland in 4 out of 5 of the former municipalities. In Iniö, only 1 voter out of 173 total voted for Pargas, in all four, 62 out of 2,060, while in Pargas proper, 74.5% voted for Pargas.

The municipality council (Swedish: "Fullmäktige") decided on 14 June 2011 in favour of the majority population and decided to rename the municipality Pargas on 1 January 2012. The Council considered taking this issue up again for debate and vote. The council made a re-vote on 6 September 2011 with 25 votes for Pargas, 17 for Väståboland and 1 blank vote.

==== Merge with Kimitoön ====
The possibility of merging with Kimitoön to form a single municipality that would include the entire Åboland archipelago has been discussed since 2007, with interest being reignited by the healthcare reforms during the Sipilä Cabinet.

== Geography ==
Taipalus and Koukkuri form enclaves in each other's territories with Pargas and Naantali. There were plans to exchange these islands between the cities in 2010, removing the enclaves.

== Museums ==
- Pargas hembygdsmuseum - Created to preserve the local cultural history of Pargas.
- Pargas industrimuseum - Founded in 1982 to preserve the history of the limestone industry, with evidence of limestone industry since around 1300.
- Skyttala museum, Pargas - an local museum in Skyttala, was created by Valter Johansson and donated to the city of Pargas, it has buildings from 1700-1800's.
- Sjöfartshuset i Nagu - Created in 2010, showcases the sea-faring tradition and history in Pargas since 1800's.
- Korpo hembygdsmuseum
- Korpo Skärimuseum
- Stenhuset - Utö hembygdsmuseum
- Houtskärs Skärgårdsmuseum

== Climate ==
Pargas has a humid continental climate (Köppen climate classification Dfb) closely bordering on an oceanic climate (Cfb).

Climate data for Pargas (1991–2020 normals, extremes 1959–present)
Month	Jan	Feb	Mar	Apr	May	Jun	Jul	Aug	Sep	Oct	Nov	Dec	Year
Record high °C (°F)	7.7 (45.9)	6.7 (44.1)	11.6 (52.9)	15.9 (60.6)	21.5 (70.7)	25.9 (78.6)	29.2 (84.6)	27.1 (80.8)	22.3 (72.1)	17.0 (62.6)	12.8 (55.0)	9.2 (48.6)	29.2 (84.6)
Mean daily maximum °C (°F)	1.4 (34.5)	0.2 (32.4)	1.8 (35.2)	5.6 (42.1)	10.7 (51.3)	15.6 (60.1)	19.8 (67.6)	19.6 (67.3)	15.3 (59.5)	9.9 (49.8)	5.9 (42.6)	3.5 (38.3)	9.1 (48.4)
Daily mean °C (°F)	−0.2 (31.6)	−1.4 (29.5)	0.1 (32.2)	3.5 (38.3)	8.3 (46.9)	13.4 (56.1)	17.6 (63.7)	17.7 (63.9)	13.6 (56.5)	8.5 (47.3)	4.6 (40.3)	2.0 (35.6)	7.3 (45.2)
Mean daily minimum °C (°F)	−1.8 (28.8)	−3.0 (26.6)	−1.6 (29.1)	1.4 (34.5)	5.8 (42.4)	11.1 (52.0)	15.4 (59.7)	15.7 (60.3)	11.9 (53.4)	7.0 (44.6)	3.2 (37.8)	0.5 (32.9)	5.5 (41.8)
Record low °C (°F)	−27.6 (−17.7)	−28.0 (−18.4)	−21.2 (−6.2)	−11.4 (11.5)	−1.2 (29.8)	0.8 (33.4)	7.0 (44.6)	7.4 (45.3)	0.6 (33.1)	−4.5 (23.9)	−9.9 (14.2)	−22.4 (−8.3)	−28.0 (−18.4)
Average precipitation mm (inches)	44 (1.7)	34 (1.3)	32 (1.3)	24 (0.9)	28 (1.1)	42 (1.7)	47 (1.9)	57 (2.2)	57 (2.2)	66 (2.6)	62 (2.4)	57 (2.2)	551 (21.7)
Source: Extreme Weather Watch

Climate data for Parainen Fagerholm (1991-2020 normals, records 1993-present)
Month	Jan	Feb	Mar	Apr	May	Jun	Jul	Aug	Sep	Oct	Nov	Dec	Year
Record high °C (°F)	8.5 (47.3)	8.9 (48.0)	11.6 (52.9)	20.1 (68.2)	25.8 (78.4)	28.2 (82.8)	31.7 (89.1)	30.5 (86.9)	24.6 (76.3)	17.0 (62.6)	14.1 (57.4)	9.7 (49.5)	31.7 (89.1)
Mean daily maximum °C (°F)	0.5 (32.9)	−0.7 (30.7)	1.8 (35.2)	6.7 (44.1)	12.3 (54.1)	17.0 (62.6)	20.5 (68.9)	19.8 (67.6)	15.3 (59.5)	9.7 (49.5)	5.5 (41.9)	2.7 (36.9)	9.3 (48.7)
Daily mean °C (°F)	−1.3 (29.7)	−2.6 (27.3)	−0.6 (30.9)	3.5 (38.3)	9.1 (48.4)	14.0 (57.2)	17.8 (64.0)	17.4 (63.3)	13.2 (55.8)	8.0 (46.4)	4.0 (39.2)	1.2 (34.2)	7.0 (44.6)
Mean daily minimum °C (°F)	−3.6 (25.5)	−5.2 (22.6)	−3.5 (25.7)	0.8 (33.4)	5.8 (42.4)	11.1 (52.0)	15.2 (59.4)	15.1 (59.2)	11.3 (52.3)	6.5 (43.7)	2.4 (36.3)	−0.7 (30.7)	4.6 (40.3)
Record low °C (°F)	−26.8 (−16.2)	−25.7 (−14.3)	−20.8 (−5.4)	−11.3 (11.7)	−1.2 (29.8)	4.2 (39.6)	9.6 (49.3)	8.2 (46.8)	3.5 (38.3)	−4.0 (24.8)	−12.0 (10.4)	−20.3 (−4.5)	−26.8 (−16.2)
Average precipitation mm (inches)	56 (2.2)	39 (1.5)	36 (1.4)	30 (1.2)	29 (1.1)	46 (1.8)	52 (2.0)	62 (2.4)	59 (2.3)	72 (2.8)	70 (2.8)	67 (2.6)	617 (24.3)
Average precipitation days (≥ 0.1 mm)	17	13	12	11	9	10	10	13	13	16	18	19	161
Source 1: https://www.ilmatieteenlaitos.fi/ilmastollinen-vertailukausi
Source 2: https://kilotavu.com/asema-taulukko.php?asema=100924

== International relations ==
=== Twin towns — Sister cities ===
Pargas is twinned with:

- Haninge Municipality, Sweden

== See also ==
- Utö Island
