= Angelniemi =

- Former Municipality
- Angelniemen kunta Angelniemi kommun
- Coat of arms

- Location of Angelniemi in Finland (1960).
- Interactive map of Angelniemi
- Location within Southwest Finland Location within Finland Location within Europe
- Country: Finland
- Region: Southwest Finland
- Sub-region: Salo
- Established: 1916
- Merged: 1967
- Seat: Kokkila

Area
  - Urban: 63.7 km^{2} (24.6 sq mi)

Population
  - Density: 0/km^{2} (0/sq mi)
  - Urban density: 16.5/km^{2} (43/sq mi)
  - Metro: 1,051
- statistics from 1961
- Time zone: UTC+02:00 (EET)
  - Summer (DST): UTC+03:00 (EEST)
- Climate: Dfb

Angelniemi (Finnish pronunciation: [ˈɑŋːelˌnie̯mi]) is a former municipality of Finland. It became part of Halikko in 1967. It was located on partly on the continent by the Halikonlahti Bay and partly on Kimito Island and is still nowadays the only part of the island where Finnish is the primary language. Today the population of the area is 398, but it rises during the summer because of the summer cottages.

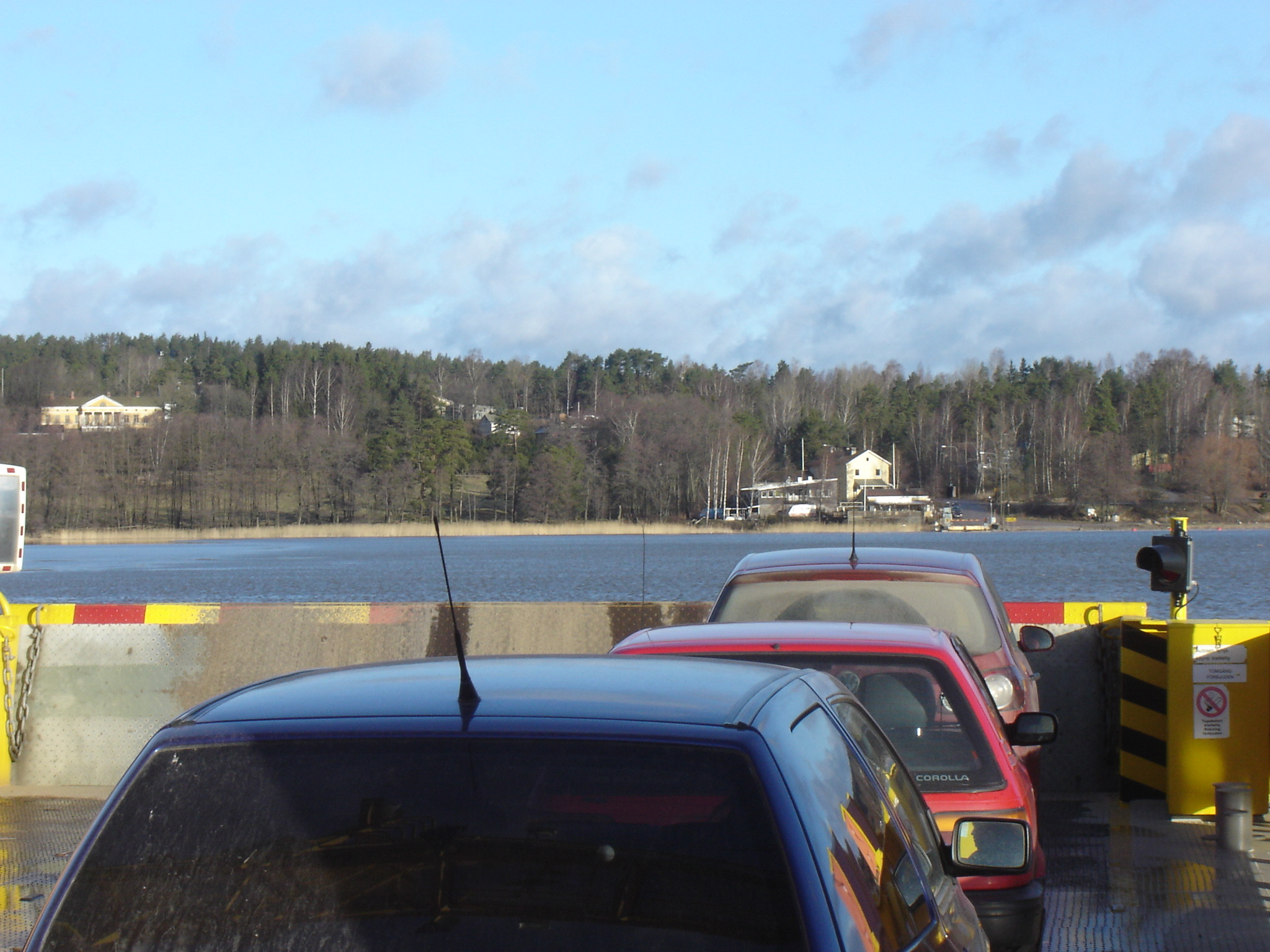
The center of Angelniemi from the cable ferry

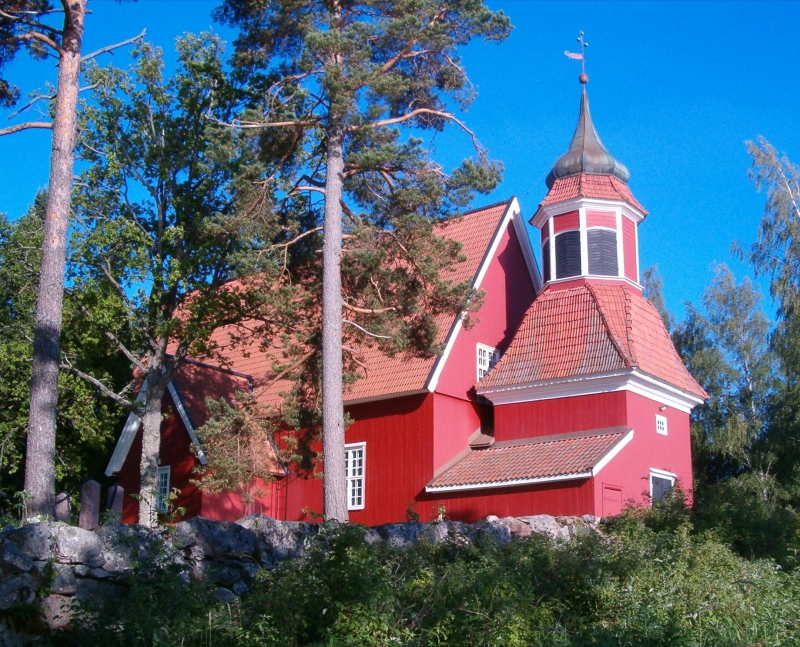
Angelniemi Church

The center of the municipality was Kokkila, which lies on the continent. There is a cable ferry which connects Kokkila to the Kimito Island. Other isles of Angelniemi are Angelansaari, Kokkilansaari, Pikkusaari and Karhusaari.

Angelniemi congregation was established 1657 as a chapel of Halikko. Angelniemi became independent 1916 and it reached its high in 1957 at 1,217 people. In 1967 Angelniemi was merged back to Halikko.

== Villages ==
Ahtmaa, Angela, Asila, Esselpää, Isokylä, Kanamäki, Karviainen, Kokkila, Myllyperä, Paatelmaa, Peksala, Päärnäspää, Pöylä, Sapalahti, Tammenpää, Toppjoki, Torkkila, Tuiskula, Valttila

== History ==
Angelniemi was originally a farm named Angela within the village of Päärnäspää. The name Angela is derived from the dialectal word angelma meaning "Filipendula sp." (standard Finnish angervo). A village by that name has existed at least since 1540, when it was mentioned as Anghela and a part of the Halikko parish.

Angelniemi became a chapel community in 1659 and was called Korpi. The name Angelniemi for the parish appears in 1692, but it was also called Päärnäspää since the church was located in the village of Päärnäspää. The name Angelniemi became the dominant name because its first chaplain, Petrus Gregorii, started using Angelnius as his surname. The names Korpi and Päärnäspää were still occasionally used for the parish until the late 18th century. The names Korvinen, Andelma and Angela were also occasionally used for the parish.

The Angelniemi church was built in 1772-1774 by Matti Åkerblom. Today, the church and the peninsula it is on are classified as a built-up cultural environment of national significance. Angelniemi became a separate municipality and parish in 1916.

Angelniemi became a part of Halikko again in 1967. Halikko was consolidated with Salo in 2009.

== See also ==
- List of former municipalities of Finland
- Angelniemen Ankkuri
- Teijo, Salo
