= Åboland =

Åboland Turunmaa
- Sub-region
- Flag

- Coordinates: 60°7′7.00″N 22°1′12.72″E
- Country: Finland
- Region: Southwest Finland

Population
  - Total: 21,052
- Time zone: UTC+2 (EET)
  - Summer (DST): UTC+3 (EEST)

Åboland (Finnish: Turunmaa) is a sub-region in the archipelago of the Southwest Finland region in south-western Finland.

Åboland and Turunmaa are also informal names of the region, but in this context Särkisalo (Swedish: Finby) is normally included and in the Finnish name Turunmaa also the northern Finnish-speaking part of the archipelago. Whether e.g. Kaarina should be included is unclear. Historically also the inland was included.

The sub-region consists of the majority Finland-Swedish former municipalities of Dragsfjärd, Houtskär, Iniö, Kimito, Korpo, Nagu, Pargas, and Västanfjärd, all of which are located in the archipelago around the city of Turku (Swedish: Åbo), in the Archipelago Sea. The sub-region has a population of 22,774 (2004), of which 63.6% are Swedish-speakers. It is one of the major concentrations of Swedish-speakers in the country, together with coastal Ostrobothnia, southern Uusimaa, and Åland.

The only city in the sub-region was Pargas, which accounts for more than a half of its population. There are over 20,000 islands in the area, mostly sparsely inhabited, and many people from around Turku and Helsinki have summer residences there. Politically the sub-region, like other areas in Finland with a Swedish-speaking majority, is largely ruled by the Swedish People's Party (SFP) which received 57 per cent of the vote in the last municipal elections in 2004.

The archipelago municipalities were merged to form the two new municipalities Väståboland and Kimitoön on January 1, 2009.

The Archipelago Ring Road (Swedish: Skärgårdens Ringväg, Finnish: Saariston Rengastie) connects the municipalities by bridges and ferries. The Guardian's journalist Tristan Parker wrote on July 29, 2021, an article praising about the Turku Archipelago, mentioning that "nowhere has the gentle magic of the smaller islands – or their wildlife."

== Municipalities ==
| Coat of arms | Municipality | Population | Land area (km^{2}) | Density (/km^{2}) | Finnish speakers | Swedish speakers | Other speakers |
|---|---|---|---|---|---|---|---|
| Coat of arms of Kimitoön | Kimitoön | 6,340 | 687 | 9 | 30 % | 65 % | 5 % |
| Coat of arms of Pargas | Pargas | 14,712 | 884 | 17 | 42 % | 53 % | 5 % |
| | Total | 21,052 | 1,571 | 13 | 38 % | 57 % | 5 % |
