= Southwest Finland =

Region of Finland

Southwest Finland Varsinais-Suomi (Finnish) Egentliga Finland (Swedish) Finland Proper
- Region
- Region of Finland Proper; Varsinais-Suomen maakunta Landskapet Egentliga Finland
- Coat of arms

- Southwest Finland on a map of Finland
- Country: Finland
- Historical province: Finland Proper
- Capital: Turku
- Other towns: Kaarina, Laitila, Loimaa, Naantali, Paimio, Pargas, Raisio, Salo, Somero and Uusikaupunki

Government
  - Regional Mayor: Jyri Arponen

Area
  - Total: 10,910.05 km^{2} (4,212.39 sq mi)

Population (2022)
  - Total: 485,567
  - Density: 44.5064/km^{2} (115.271/sq mi)

GDP
  - Total: €16.219 billion (2015)
  - Per capita: €34,252 (2015)
- Time zone: UTC+2 (EET)
  - Summer (DST): UTC+3 (EEST)
- ISO 3166 code: FI-19
- NUTS: 183
- Regional animal: Red fox
- Regional bird: Western jackdaw
- Regional fish: Baltic herring
- Regional flower: Oak
- Regional stone: Red granite
- Regional lake: Pyhäjärvi
- Website: varsinais-suomi.fi

Southwest Finland (Finnish: Varsinais-Suomi, IPA: [ˈʋɑrs̠inɑi̯s̠ˌs̠uo̞̯mi]; Swedish: Egentliga Finland) is a region (Finnish: maakunta, Swedish: landskap) of Finland. It borders the regions of Satakunta, Pirkanmaa, Kanta-Häme, Uusimaa, and Åland. The regional capital and most populous city is Turku, which was the capital city of Finland before Helsinki.

The region largely corresponds to the historical province of Finland Proper. Until 2019, its official English name was Finland Proper, a designation still used in Finnish (Varsinais-Suomi) and Swedish (Egentliga Finland).

== Origin of the name Finland Proper ==
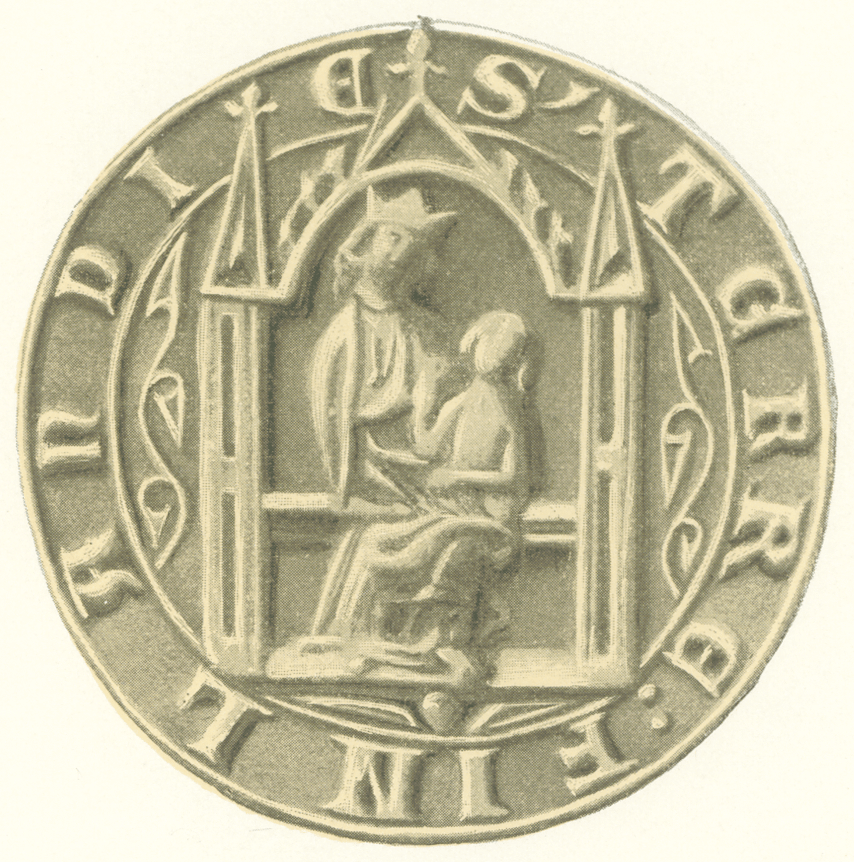
The seal of Finland Proper from 1326

The name Finland Proper has historical roots. In Early Middle Ages, in the area of the present-day Southern Finland was inhabited by three main tribes: the Finns, the Tavastians and the Karelians. The southwestern part of the country, where the Finns lived, was originally called simply Finland (Suomi in Finnish).

By the 17th century, the name Finland began to be used for a broader area, creating a need for a more specific name for this region. The earliest recorded terms for "Finland Proper" appeared in Latin in the 1650s as Fennigia specialiter dicta and Fennigia presse dicta. Later, in the 18th century, the Swedish terms Finland för sig sielft and Egenteliga Finland emerged. The modern Swedish name Egentliga Finland became officially recognized by the end of the century, while the Finnish equivalent, Varsinais-Suomi, was established around the 1850s.

== Geography ==
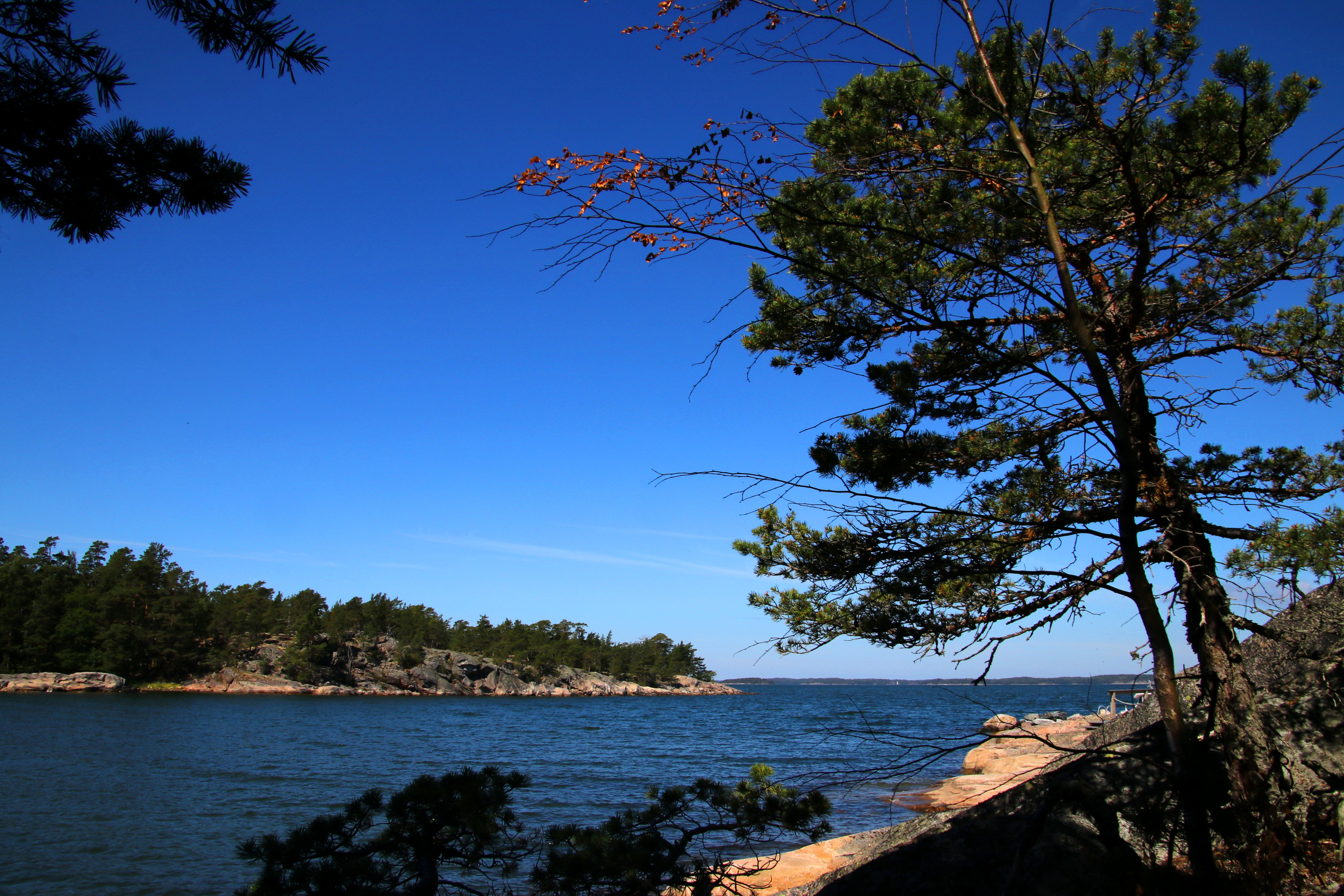
Turku Archipelago

Southwest Finland's nature differs from other regions. The most notable biotopes are the Archipelago Sea and groves. 80% of Finland's insect species can be found in Southwest Finland. There are around 20,000 islands near the coast.

The southernmost point of Southwest Finland and the southernmost inhabited island is Utö. Its highest point is 164 meters in Kiikala.

== Heraldry ==
The region uses the coat of arms of the historical province of Finland Proper. The knight's helmet motif on the coat of arms has been interpreted as symbolizing the court of the Duke of Finland, in the southern part of the duchy, as well as the region's position as the administrative centre of the land.

== Municipalities ==
The region of Southwest Finland consists of 27 municipalities, 11 of which have city status (marked in bold).

=== Municipalities on the map ===
Cities and municipalities of Southwest Finland.

=== Sub-regions ===
Loimaa sub-region:

- Aura
- Koski Tl (Koskis)
- **Loimaa**
- Marttila (S:t Mårtens)
- Oripää
- Pöytyä (Pöytis)

Turku sub-region:

- **Kaarina** (S:t Karins)
- Lieto (Lundo)
- Masku (Masko)
- Mynämäki (Virmo)
- **Naantali** (Nådendal)
- Nousiainen (Nousis)
- **Paimio** (Pemar)
- **Raisio** (Reso)
- Rusko
- Sauvo (Sagu)
- **Turku** (Åbo)

Åboland–Turunmaa sub-region:

- Kimitoön (Kemiönsaari)
- **Pargas** (Parainen)

Salo sub-region:

- **Salo**
- **Somero**

Vakka-Suomi sub-region:

- Kustavi (Gustavs)
- **Laitila** (Letala)
- Pyhäranta
- Taivassalo (Tövsala)
- **Uusikaupunki** (Nystad)
- Vehmaa (Vemo)

=== List of municipalities ===
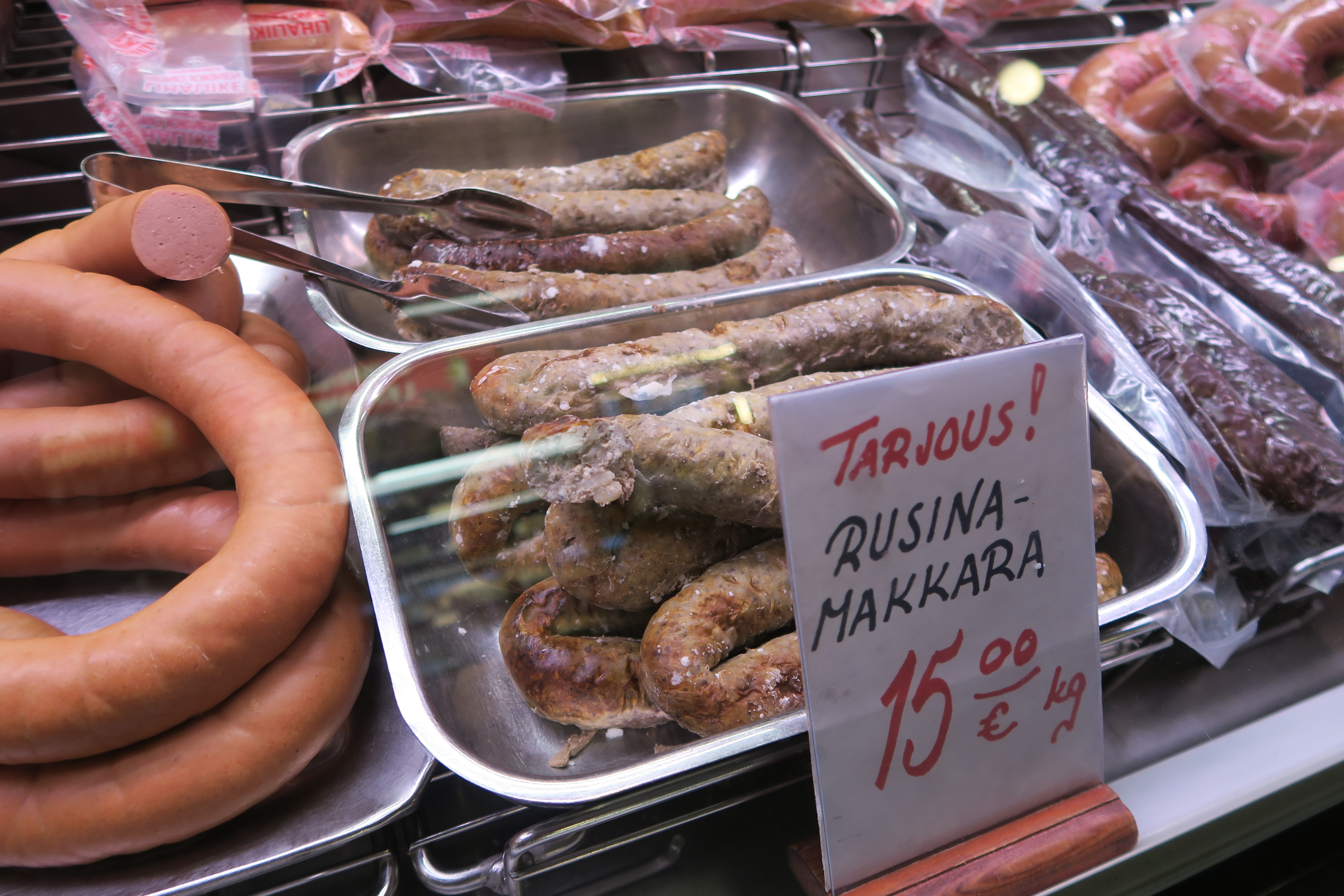
Raisin sausage

Coat of arms	Municipality	Population	Land area (km^{2})	Density (/km^{2})	Finnish speakers	Swedish speakers	Other speakers
Coat of arms of Aura, Finland	Aura	3,937	95	41	96 %	0 %	3 %
Coat of arms of Kaarina	Kaarina	36,675	151	244	88 %	5 %	7 %
Coat of arms of Koski Tl	Koski Tl	2,144	192	11	95 %	0 %	4 %
Coat of arms of Kimitoön	Kimitoön	6,340	687	9	30 %	65 %	5 %
Coat of arms of Kustavi	Kustavi	972	166	6	93 %	2 %	5 %
Coat of arms of Laitila	Laitila	8,400	532	16	86 %	0 %	14 %
Coat of arms of Lieto	Lieto	20,732	301	69	94 %	2 %	5 %
Coat of arms of Loimaa	Loimaa	15,124	848	18	94 %	0 %	6 %
Coat of arms of Marttila	Marttila	1,890	195	10	96 %	1 %	3 %
Coat of arms of Masku	Masku	9,612	175	55	96 %	1 %	3 %
Coat of arms of Mynämäki	Mynämäki	7,424	520	14	95 %	1 %	4 %
Coat of arms of Naantali	Naantali	20,390	313	65	94 %	1 %	5 %
Coat of arms of Nousiainen	Nousiainen	4,667	199	23	95 %	1 %	4 %
Coat of arms of Oripää	Oripää	1,264	118	11	90 %	0 %	10 %
Coat of arms of Paimio	Paimio	11,284	239	47	94 %	1 %	5 %
Coat of arms of Pargas	Pargas	14,712	884	17	42 %	53 %	5 %
Coat of arms of Pyhäranta	Pyhäranta	1,892	144	13	97 %	1 %	3 %
Coat of arms of Pöytyä	Pöytyä	7,903	750	11	94 %	1 %	5 %
Coat of arms of Raisio	Raisio	26,036	49	534	84 %	1 %	15 %
Coat of arms of Rusko	Rusko	6,381	127	50	95 %	2 %	3 %
Coat of arms of Salo	Salo	50,339	1,987	25	89 %	1 %	9 %
Coat of arms of Sauvo	Sauvo	2,957	253	12	90 %	2 %	7 %
Coat of arms of Somero	Somero	8,339	668	12	93 %	1 %	7 %
Coat of arms of Taivassalo	Taivassalo	1,707	140	12	91 %	1 %	8 %
Coat of arms of Turku	Turku	209,633	246	853	77 %	5 %	18 %
Coat of arms of Uusikaupunki	Uusikaupunki	14,783	503	29	90 %	0 %	10 %
Coat of arms of Vehmaa	Vehmaa	2,263	189	12	92 %	1 %	7 %
	Total	497,800	9,097	55	83 %	6 %	12 %

=== Municipal mergers ===
- Kuusisto merged to Kaarina in 1946.
- Naantalin maalaiskunta merged to Naantali in 1964.
- Angelniemi merged to Halikko in 1967.
- Pargas landskommun merged to Pargas in 1967.
- Uskela merged to Salo in 1967.
- Maaria merged to Turku in 1967.
- Kakskerta merged to Turku in 1968.
- Hitis merged to Dragsfjärd in 1969.
- Karuna merged to Sauvo in 1969.
- Uudenkaupungin maalaiskunta merged to Uusikaupunki in 1969.
- Paattinen merged to Turku in 1973.
- Pyhämaa merged to Uusikaupunki in 1974.
- Metsämaa merged to Loimaan kunta in 1976.
- Karjala merged to Mynämäki in 1977.
- Somerniemi merged to Somero in 1977.
- Lokalahti merged to Uusikaupunki in 1981.
- Kalanti merged to Uusikaupunki in 1993.
- Loimaan kunta merged to Loimaa in 2005.
- Karinainen merged to Pöytyä in 2005.
- Mietoinen merged to Mynämäki in 2007.
- Piikkiö merged to Kaarina in 2009.
- Dragsfjärd, Kimito, and Västanfjärd merged to form Kimitoön in 2009.
- Alastaro and Mellilä merged to Loimaa in 2009.
- Houtskär, Iniö, Korpo, Nagu, and Pargas merged to form Väståboland in 2009 (renamed Pargas in 2011).
- Askainen and Lemu merged to Masku in 2009.
- Merimasku, Rymättylä, and Velkua merged to Naantali in 2009.
- Yläne merged to Pöytyä in 2009.
- Vahto merged to Rusko in 2009.
- Halikko, Kiikala, Kisko, Kuusjoki, Muurla, Perniö, Pertteli, Suomusjärvi, and Särkisalo merged to Salo in 2009.
- Tarvasjoki merged to Lieto in 2015.

== Demographics ==
=== Population ===
Population size 1980–2025
Year	Population
1980	406,360
1985	415,899
1990	425,282
1995	435,119
2000	447,103
2005	455,584
2010	465,183
2015	474,323
2020	481,403
2025	497,800

=== Languages ===
As of 2020, Southwest Finland had a population of 481,403, making it the third most populated Finnish region after Uusimaa and Pirkanmaa. 86.45% speak Finnish, 5.68% Swedish and 7.86% speak other languages, the most common being Russian, Estonian, Arabic, Kurdish and Albanian.

It has the most summer cottages out of any Finnish region, with 49,000 as of 2012.

Significant foreign resident groups
31 December 2020
1	Soviet Union	6,153
2	Estonia	4,092
3	Iraq	3,775
4	Yugoslavia	2,934
5	Iran	1,964
6	Somalia	1,807
7	Vietnam	1,023
8	Romania	960
9	Poland	948
10	Thailand	914
11	Afghanistan	834
12	China	816
13	Russia	757
14	Syria	669
15	Turkey	624
16	Germany	555
17	Ukraine	550
18	Sweden	511
19	United Kingdom	477
20	Latvia	458

== Politics ==
In parliamentary elections, Southwest Finland forms a single electoral district. As of 2023, the Southwest Finland constituency elects 17 of the 200 members of the Parliament of Finland.

== See also ==
- Finns proper
- Southwest Finnish dialects
