= Houtskär =

Houtskär Houtskär – Houtskari
- Former municipality
- Houtskärs kommun Houtskarin kunta
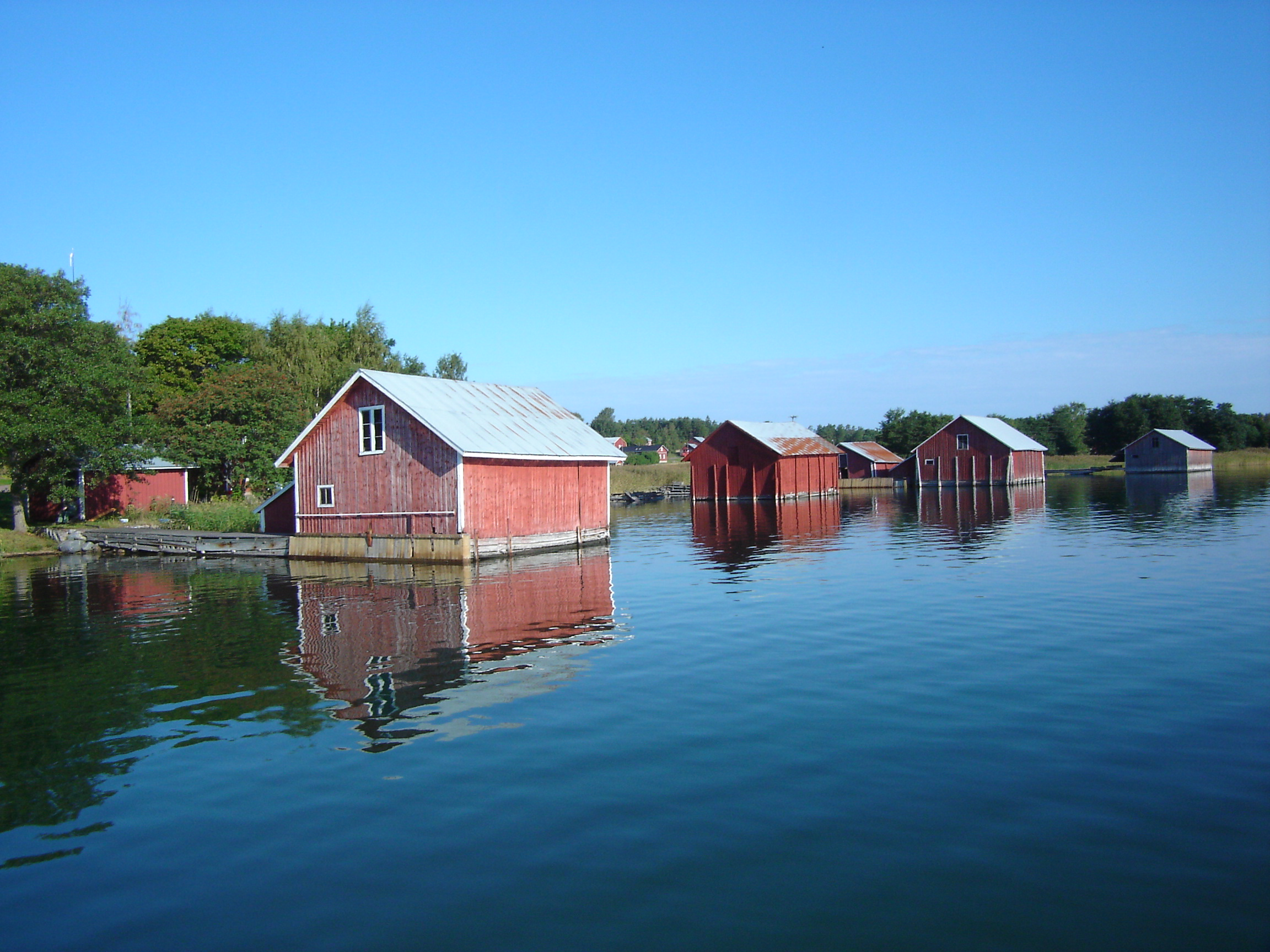
- Boathouses in Hyppeis

- Coat of arms

- Location of Houtskär in Finland
- Interactive map of Houtskär
- Location within Southwest Finland Location within Finland Location within Europe
- Coordinates: 60°13′20″N 021°22′20″E
- Country: Finland
- Region: Southwest Finland
- Sub-region: Åboland
- Consolidated: 2009

Area
  - Total: 566.81 km^{2} (218.85 sq mi)
  - Land: 119.93 km^{2} (46.31 sq mi)
  - Water: 446.88 km^{2} (172.54 sq mi)

Population (2008-12-31)
  - Total: 621
  - Density: 5.18/km^{2} (13.4/sq mi)

Population by native language
  - Finnish: 14% (official)
  - Swedish: 86% (official)

Population by age (2007)
  - 0 to 14: 14.8%
  - 15 to 64: 60.3%
  - 65 or older: 24.8%
- Time zone: UTC+2 (EET)
  - Summer (DST): UTC+3 (EEST)

Houtskär (Finland Swedish: [ˈhuːtɕæːr]; Finnish: Houtskari [ˈhou̯tskɑri]) is an island group and former municipality of Finland. On 1 January 2009, it was consolidated with Iniö, Korpo, Nagu and Pargas to form the municipality of Pargas (originally named Väståboland). Houtskär was neighboured by municipalities of Brändö, Iniö, Kökar, Korpo and Sottunga.

It is located in the Archipelago Sea in the province of Western Finland and is part of the Southwest Finland region. The municipality had a population of 621 (as of 31 December 2008) and covered a land area of 119.93 square kilometres (46.31 sq mi). The population density was 5.18 inhabitants per square kilometre (13.4/sq mi).

The municipality was bilingual with the majority (86%) being Swedish and minority Finnish speakers.

There are one store in Houtskär, a bank and post office, and the church of Santa Maria in Näsby center. At various times throughout the year dances, accompanied by live music, are held which are an old tradition kept alive by both older and younger participants who dance in a variety of styles.

Houtskär consists of a group of bigger islands and many smaller islands in the surrounding sea area. Communications to the mainland is by the ”Archipelago road” through Pargas, Nagu and Korpo, with three ferries considered part of the road network, the trip with the last one from Korpo to Houtskär lasting half an hour. The main islands are connected by bridges or cable ferries, the outer inhabited islands usually have daily connections with ship-like ferries.

== History ==
The name of Houtskär is of Finnish origin. The hout- element does not come from any Swedish word, instead coming from the Finnish word hauta which in this context may refer to a deep part of the sea or a burial site. The original Finnish name can be reconstructed as *Hautasaari or *Hautasalo, where saari/salo was then translated into Swedish as skär. Houtskari is a later Finnish transcription of the Swedish name.

Houtskär was first mentioned in 1554. A chapel was built in the village of Näsby in the early 17th century, while a church was built there in the 18th century. At the time, Houtskär was a part of the Korpo (Korppoo) parish. In 1865, Houtskär became a separate municipality.

In 2009, Houtskär became a part of the new Väståboland municipality, which was renamed to Pargas in 2012.
