= Korpo =

Former municipality in southern Finland, now part of Pargas

Korpo Korpo – Korppoo
- Former municipality
- Korpo kommun Korppoon kunta
- Coat of arms

- Location of Korpo in Finland (2008).
- Interactive map of Korpo
- Location within Southwest Finland Location within Finland Location within Europe
- Country: Finland
- Province: Western Finland
- Region: Southwest Finland
- Sub-region: Åboland
- Consolidated to Väståboland: 2009

Government
  - Municipal manager: Patrik Nygrén

Area
  - Total: 170.11 km^{2} (65.68 sq mi)
  - Land: 168.85 km^{2} (65.19 sq mi)

Population (2004-12-31)
  - Total: 889
  - Density: 5.27/km^{2} (13.6/sq mi)
  - Urbanisation: 33.6%
- Time zone: UTC+02:00 (EET)
  - Summer (DST): UTC+03:00 (EEST)
- Official languages: Swedish, Finnish
- Unemployment rate: 10.7%

Korpo (Finland Swedish: [ˈkorpːu]; Finnish: Korppoo [ˈkorpːoː]) is an island located in the Turku archipelago. It is a former municipality of Finland. On 1 January 2009, it was consolidated with Houtskär, Iniö, Nagu and Pargas to form the new town of Väståboland. As of 1 January 2012, Väståboland was renamed Pargas (Parainen in Finnish), which is also the name of a town on one of the islands, which has proven somewhat confusing for tourists and visitors to the area.

The climate in Korpo is somewhat different from the mainland's climate. It typically has cooler summers than the mainland, but the winters are also less harsh. The archipelago as a whole is considered to have the shortest winter in Finland.

Korpo is a favourite tourist destination in Finland and it is home to many summer cottages. It is believed in the summer months the population rises from around 800 to 5,000. This is reflected in additional car ferries to and from the island operating in these months. Even so, with extra ferries there can still be extensive queues at peak times in summer and especially at weekends, when travellers can expect to wait up to an hour to board a car ferry.

Korpo also has a ferry terminal on the north of the island operating ferries to Houtskär, Norrskata and the Åland islands.

It is in the province of Western Finland and is part of the Southwest Finland region. The municipality had a population of 889 (2004-12-31) and covered an area of 170.11 km^{2} (65.68 sq mi) (excluding sea), of which 1.26 km^{2} (0.49 sq mi) is inland water. The population density was 5.27 inhabitants per km^{2}. Utö, the southernmost inhabited island of Finland belonged to the municipality.

The municipality was bilingual, with the majority being Swedish and the minority Finnish speakers.

There are many islands belonging to Korpo, Aspö for example.

== Gallery ==
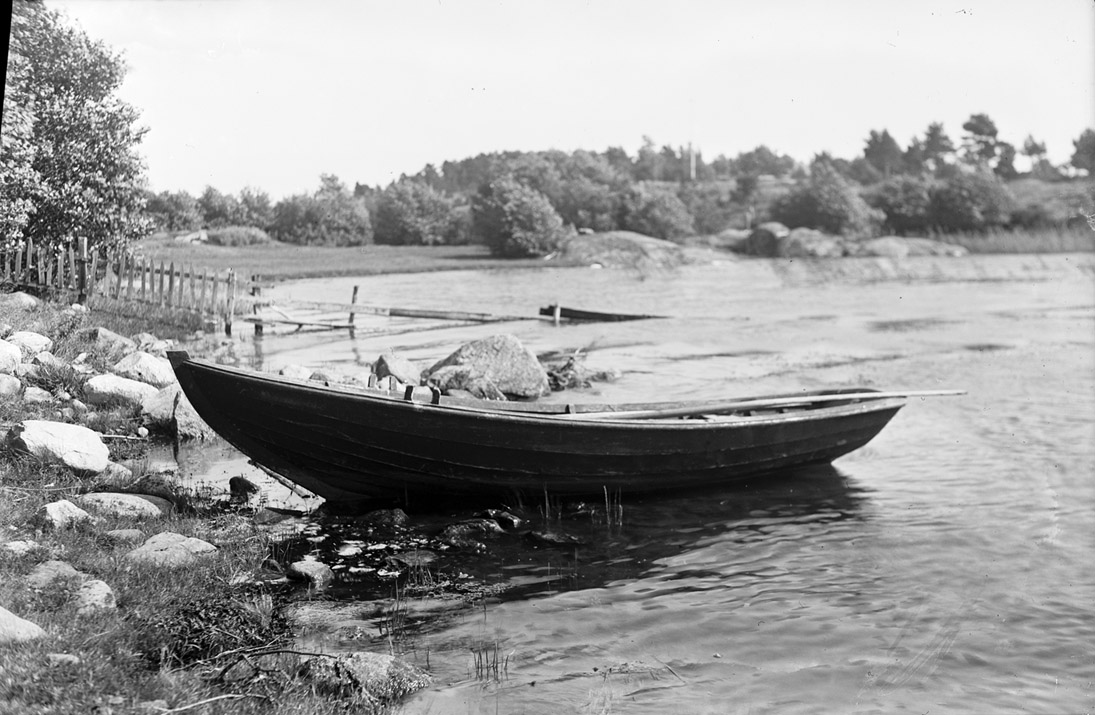
The sailboat Julia docked at Korpo
