= Iniö =

Former municipality in Finland

- Former municipality
- Iniö kommun Iniön kunta
- Coat of arms

- Location of Iniö in Finland (2008).
- Interactive map of Iniö
- Location within Southwest Finland Location within Finland Location within Europe
- Country: Finland
- Province: Western Finland
- Region: Southwest Finland
- Sub-region: Åboland
- Consolidated to Väståboland: 2009

Area
  - Total: 63.86 km^{2} (24.66 sq mi)
  - Land: 63.69 km^{2} (24.59 sq mi)

Population (2008-12-31)
  - Total: 250
  - Density: 3.9/km^{2} (10/sq mi)
  - Urbanisation: 0.0%
- Time zone: UTC+02:00 (EET)
  - Summer (DST): UTC+03:00 (EEST)
- Official languages: Swedish, Finnish
- Unemployment rate: 5.0%

Iniö is a former municipality of Finland. On 1 January 2009, it was consolidated with Houtskär, Korpo, Nagu and Pargas to form the new town of Väståboland, which name from the beginning of 2012 was changed to Pargas. Iniö was neighboured by Brändö, Houtskär, Korpo, Kustavi, Taivassalo and Velkua.

It is located in the province of Western Finland and is part of the Southwest Finland region. The municipality had a population of 250 (2008-12-31) and covered an area of 63.86 km^{2} (24.66 sq mi) (excluding sea) of which 0.17 km^{2} (0.07 sq mi) is inland water. The population density was 3.97 inhabitants per km^{2}.

The municipality was bilingual, with majority being Swedish and minority Finnish speakers.
