= Paattinen =

- Former municipality
- Paattisten kunta Patis kommun
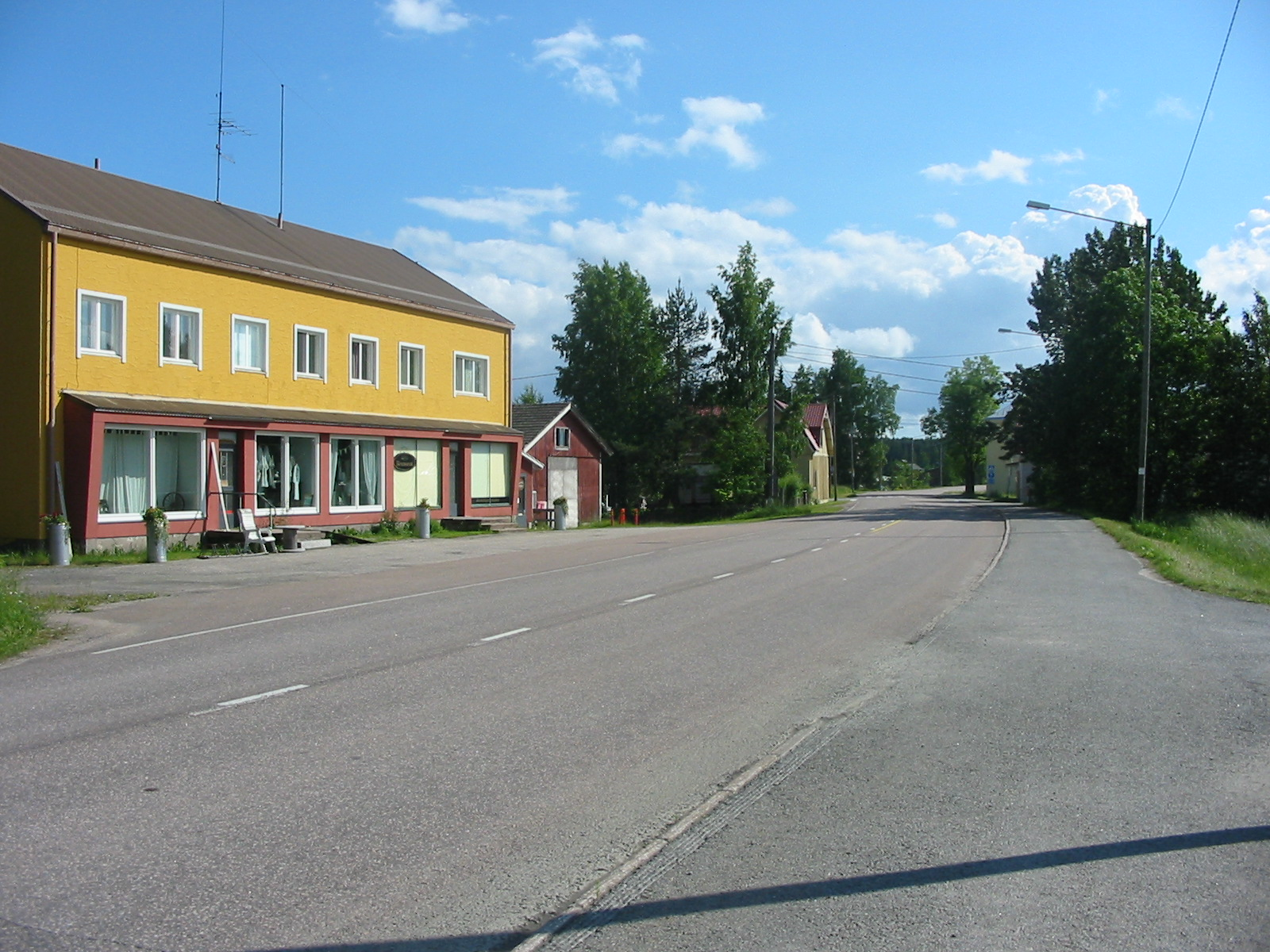
- The village center of Paattinen

- Coat of arms

- Location of Paattinen in Finland
- Coordinates: 60°35′N 22°23′E
- Country: Finland
- Province: Turku and Pori Province
- Region: Finland Proper
- Established: 1937
- Merged into Turku: 1973
- Seat: Paattinen

Area
  - Land: 58.8 km^{2} (22.7 sq mi)

Population (1972-12-31)
  - Total: 1,900

Paattinen (Finnish: [ˈpɑːtːinen]; Swedish: Patis) is a village in south-west Finland and a district of the city of Turku. It is located to the north of the city, and is the largest of the city's districts by area. It borders the neighbouring municipalities of Vahto, Nousiainen, Mynämäki, Pöytyä, Aura and Lieto. It is rather sparsely populated, and has a population of only 2,430 (as of 2004) despite being much larger than any other of the city's districts. Paattinen has an annual population growth rate of 0.99%.

20.21% of the district's population are under 15 years old, while 15.31% are over 65. The district's linguistic makeup is 98.40% Finnish, 1.03% Swedish, and 0.58% other, making Paattinen one of the most homogeneous districts in Turku.

Paattinen is also a former municipality of Finland. It is the most recent municipality to be annexed to Turku, in 1973.

== History ==
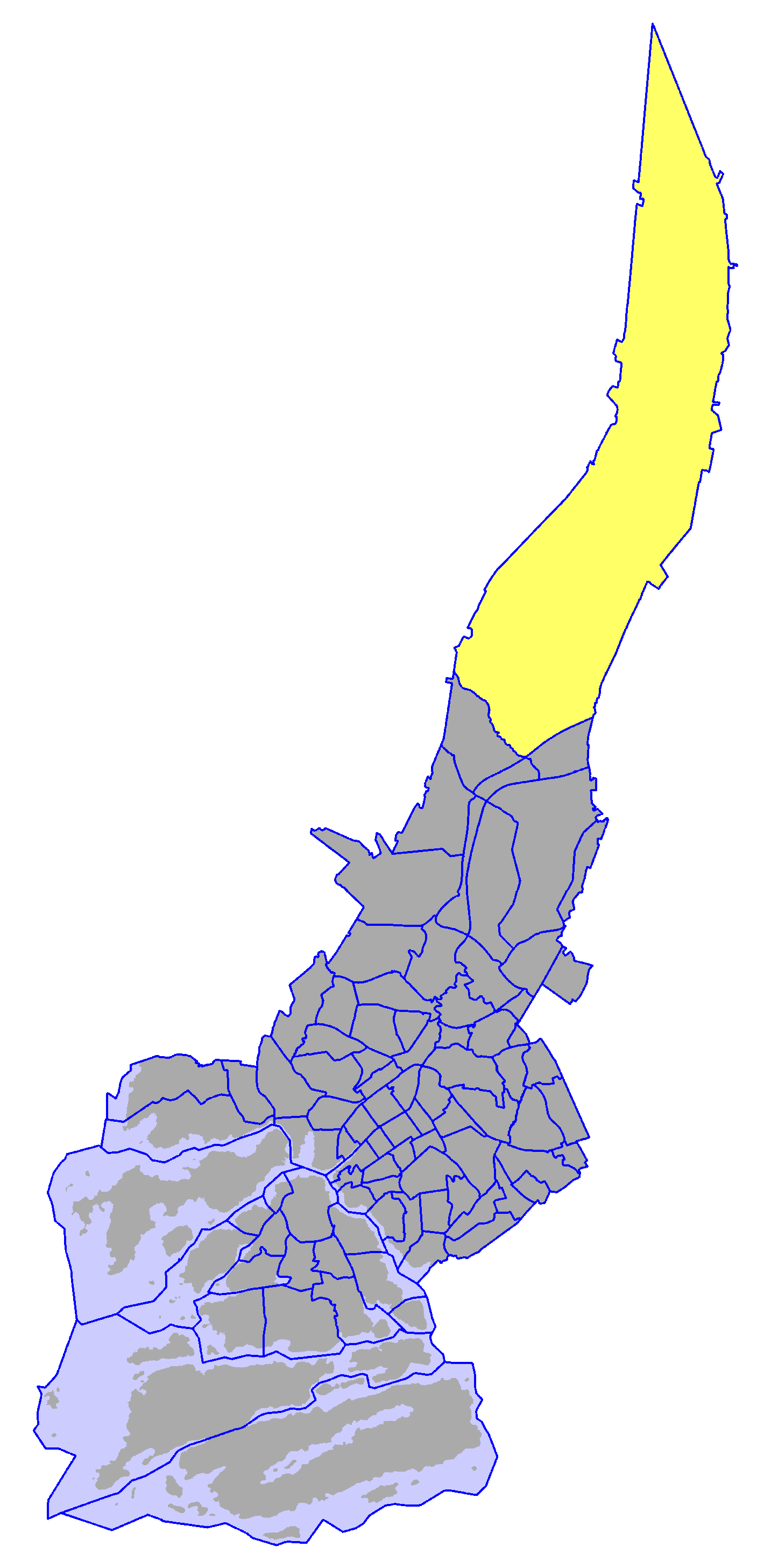
Paattinen on a map of Turku/Åbo

The name of Paattinen is derived from a local dialectal word paatti meaning "boat", most likely via a river name *Paattijoki, now called Paattistenjoki or Vähäjoki. It was first mentioned in 1359 when it was a part of the Maaria parish. Paattinen acquired its first church in the 1580s, but it got chapel rights later in 1689 under the name Paattiskorpi. Paattinen was transferred to Vahto in 1893. Paattinen became a separate municipality in 1937, even though the separation was ordered already in 1901.

In 1973, Paattinen was consolidated with Turku.

== See also ==
- Districts of Turku
- Districts of Turku by population
