= Thais in Finland =

Ethnic group in Finland

Thaimaalaiset Suomessa / Suomen thaimaalaiset

Total population
- 14,003 born in Thailand; 12,712 Thai speakers (2025)

Regions with significant populations
- Helsinki, Tampere and Turku regions & Oulu and Lahti

Languages
- Thai, Finnish

Religion
- Theravada Buddhism

Thais in Finland or Finnish Thais are people of Thailand background who live in Finland. People may be born in Thailand, have Thai ancestors and/or be citizens of Thailand. As of 2025, there were 14,003 people born in Thailand living in Finland. Similarly, the number of people with Thai citizenship was 8,585. The number of people who spoke Thai as their mother tongue was 12,712.

== Demographics ==
Historical population
Year	Pop.	±% p.a.
1990	244	—
1995	813	+27.22%
2000	1,458	+12.39%
2005	3,033	+15.78%
2010	5,722	+13.54%
2015	8,582	+8.44%
2020	10,553	+4.22%
2025	12,712	+3.79%
Thai speakers. Source: Statistics Finland

People born in Thailand and living in Finland, according to Statistics Finland.

Country of birth Thailand by municipality (2024)
Municipality	Population
Whole country	13,604
Helsinki	1,732
Vantaa	1,141
Espoo	691
Tampere	558
Turku	454
Oulu	413
Lahti	364
Jyväskylä	301
Kuopio	279
Vaasa	231
Kouvola	201
Lappeenranta	194
Pori	190
Porvoo	186
Seinäjoki	179
Hämeenlinna	171
Kerava	166
Kokkola	144
Hyvinkää	143
Rovaniemi	136
Salo	133
Kotka	126
Lohja	118
Tuusula	115
Järvenpää	114
Närpes	114
Nurmijärvi	107
Joensuu	106
Mikkeli	102
Raseborg	100
Mariehamn	99
Kemi	94
Savonlinna	92
Sievi	83
Rauma	80
Nokia	76
Mäntsälä	73
Tornio	71
Jakobstad	70
Riihimäki	70
Kirkkonummi	68
Kaarina	66
Kajaani	65
Vihti	57
Varkaus	56
Hanko	55
Heinola	55
Loviisa	55
Sipoo	55
Kangasala	54
Raisio	53
Valkeakoski	52
Ylöjärvi	51
Janakkala	50
Raahe	50
Kurikka	46
Lieto	46
Korsholm	46
Äänekoski	46
Imatra	45
Siilinjärvi	45
Uusikaupunki	42
Hollola	41
Sotkamo	41
Pargas	40
Iisalmi	39
Lapua	38
Pirkkala	38
Kempele	36
Forssa	34
Hamina	34
Kalajoki	34
Akaa	33
Lieksa	33
Orimattila	33
Pieksämäki	33
Ylivieska	33
Kauhajoki	32
Lempäälä	32
Pedersöre	32
Rantasalmi	32
Jomala	30
Naantali	30
Sastamala	29
Jämsä	28
Laihia	28
Loimaa	28
Joroinen	26
Huittinen	25
Laukaa	24
Inari	23
Kontiolahti	22
Liperi	22
Mäntyharju	22
Kokemäki	21
Kuusamo	21
Pyhtää	21
Saarijärvi	21
Vörå	21
Hattula	20
Ilomantsi	20
Lapinlahti	20
Ulvila	20
Alajärvi	19
Eura	19
Masku	19
Eurajoki	18
Finström	18
Kittilä	18
Larsmo	18
Muurame	18
Mynämäki	18
Paimio	18
Nykarleby	18
Pihtipudas	17
Somero	17
Säkylä	17
Hausjärvi	16
Kronoby	16
Nurmes	16
Pornainen	16
Asikkala	15
Hämeenkyrö	15
Ingå	15
Korsnäs	15
Ylitornio	15
Alavus	14
Karkkila	14
Kauniainen	14
Kimitoön	14
Leppävirta	14
Malax	14
Orivesi	14
Parkano	14
Pöytyä	14
Aura	13
Harjavalta	13
Joutsa	13
Juva	13
Kannus	13
Kauhava	13
Keuruu	13
Loppi	13
Mänttä-Vilppula	13
Nivala	13
Pälkäne	13
Hyrynsalmi	12
Kankaanpää	12
Kristinestad	12
Kärkölä	12
Oulainen	12
Parikkala	12
Rautjärvi	12
Salla	12
Tammela	12
Viitasaari	12
Evijärvi	11
Hankasalmi	11
Kaustinen	11
Keminmaa	11
Kitee	11
Ilmajoki	10
Lapinjärvi	10
Petäjävesi	10
Pyhäjärvi	10
Saltvik	10
Sysmä	10
Taipalsaari	10
Utsjoki	10
Vesilahti	10

People with Thai citizenship living in Finland according to Statistics Finland.

Citizens of Thailand by municipality (2024)
Municipality	Population
Whole country	8,506
Helsinki	1,055
Vantaa	701
Espoo	388
Tampere	318
Turku	246
Lahti	242
Oulu	236
Jyväskylä	145
Kuopio	139
Vaasa	125
Kouvola	123
Lappeenranta	123
Pori	121
Salo	109
Närpes	106
Porvoo	106
Kerava	102
Hämeenlinna	101
Lohja	92
Hyvinkää	91
Rovaniemi	84
Raseborg	80
Sievi	80
Tuusula	79
Seinäjoki	78
Joensuu	73
Kokkola	71
Järvenpää	69
Nurmijärvi	68
Mariehamn	65
Kotka	64
Tornio	57
Mikkeli	55
Rauma	54
Nokia	52
Mäntsälä	48
Jakobstad	48
Varkaus	48
Savonlinna	46
Kajaani	43
Riihimäki	41
Kaarina	40
Loviisa	39
Vihti	39
Heinola	38
Kirkkonummi	38
Kurikka	36
Sipoo	36
Äänekoski	35
Hanko	34
Janakkala	34
Sotkamo	34
Ylöjärvi	34
Lapua	33
Uusikaupunki	33
Valkeakoski	33
Hollola	32
Iisalmi	31
Kangasala	31
Siilinjärvi	31
Kemi	30
Ylivieska	30
Hamina	28
Kalajoki	28
Lieksa	28
Pieksämäki	28
Kauhajoki	27
Rantasalmi	27
Lieto	26
Imatra	25
Joroinen	24
Kempele	24
Raahe	24
Raisio	24
Forssa	23
Inari	23
Pargas	23
Orimattila	22
Pyhtää	22
Jämsä	20
Kuusamo	20
Korsholm	20
Mäntyharju	20
Akaa	19
Laihia	19
Liperi	19
Kontiolahti	18
Laukaa	18
Loimaa	18
Naantali	18
Pirkkala	18
Sastamala	18
Huittinen	17
Lempäälä	17
Mynämäki	17
Alajärvi	16
Ilomantsi	16
Kannus	15
Kittilä	15
Lapinlahti	15
Leppävirta	15
Masku	14
Muurame	14
Nykarleby	14
Jomala	13
Joutsa	13
Kokemäki	13
Nurmes	13
Saarijärvi	13
Alavus	12
Finström	12
Karkkila	12
Pornainen	12
Somero	12
Eurajoki	11
Evijärvi	11
Hattula	11
Juva	11
Kankaanpää	11
Kauniainen	11
Kristinestad	11
Pedersöre	11
Pöytyä	11
Ylitornio	11
Eura	10
Hausjärvi	10
Kimitoön	10
Keuruu	10
Oulainen	10
Parikkala	10
Parkano	10
Salla	10
Säkylä	10

People with Thai as mother tongue living in Finland according to Statistics Finland.

Thai speakers by municipality (2024)
Municipality	Population
Whole country	12,355
Helsinki	1,544
Vantaa	1,112
Espoo	613
Tampere	485
Turku	419
Oulu	374
Lahti	356
Jyväskylä	230
Kuopio	203
Lappeenranta	188
Vaasa	188
Kouvola	179
Pori	175
Kerava	166
Porvoo	159
Hämeenlinna	150
Hyvinkää	144
Salo	138
Seinäjoki	120
Tuusula	117
Lohja	115
Närpes	115
Kokkola	112
Järvenpää	105
Rovaniemi	104
Joensuu	102
Kotka	102
Mariehamn	99
Nurmijärvi	95
Raseborg	86
Sievi	85
Nokia	78
Mikkeli	76
Rauma	76
Mäntsälä	75
Tornio	74
Pietarsaari	70
Kaarina	65
Kajaani	63
Riihimäki	63
Kirkkonummi	61
Vihti	58
Savonlinna	57
Varkaus	57
Sipoo	55
Loviisa	54
Heinola	51
Raisio	51
Raahe	50
Janakkala	49
Valkeakoski	49
Äänekoski	48
Kangasala	47
Kurikka	47
Lieto	46
Hollola	43
Kemi	43
Siilinjärvi	43
Ylöjärvi	42
Iisalmi	40
Imatra	40
Uusikaupunki	40
Hanko	39
Sotkamo	38
Lapua	37
Pirkkala	36
Kalajoki	35
Akaa	33
Pieksämäki	33
Ylivieska	33
Forssa	32
Hamina	32
Pargas	32
Rantasalmi	32
Kempele	31
Kauhajoki	30
Lempäälä	30
Korsholm	30
Orimattila	30
Jomala	29
Jämsä	28
Sastamala	28
Joroinen	27
Laihia	27
Lieksa	27
Naantali	27
Loimaa	26
Inari	25
Pyhtää	25
Huittinen	24
Mäntyharju	24
Lapinlahti	23
Laukaa	23
Kuusamo	22
Liperi	22
Kokemäki	21
Kontiolahti	21
Ilomantsi	20
Masku	20
Ulvila	20
Muurame	19
Orivesi	19
Saarijärvi	19
Alajärvi	18
Eura	18
Finström	17
Kittilä	17
Mynämäki	17
Paimio	17
Hausjärvi	16
Kannus	16
Pihtipudas	16
Somero	16
Nykarleby	16
Eurajoki	15
Hämeenkyrö	15
Karkkila	15
Kauniainen	15
Leppävirta	15
Pedersöre	15
Asikkala	14
Hattula	14
Säkylä	14
Evijärvi	13
Joutsa	13
Juva	13
Kimitoön	13
Loppi	13
Mänttä-Vilppula	13
Nivala	13
Parkano	13
Pornainen	13
Pöytyä	13
Ylitornio	13
Harjavalta	12
Kankaanpää	12
Keuruu	12
Kristinestad	12
Kronoby	12
Kärkölä	12
Malax	12
Oulainen	12
Parikkala	12
Pälkäne	12
Rautjärvi	12
Salla	12
Alavus	11
Aura	11
Ingå	11
Kaustinen	11
Nurmes	11
Taipalsaari	11
Tammela	11
Viitasaari	11
Hankasalmi	10
Hyrynsalmi	10
Kauhava	10
Kitee	10
Lapinjärvi	10
Pyhäjärvi	10
Suonenjoki	10

== Notable people ==
- Patrick Aaltonen, professional footballer

== See also ==
- Thai diaspora
- Immigration to Finland
