= Hämeen Härkätie =

Historical road in Finland

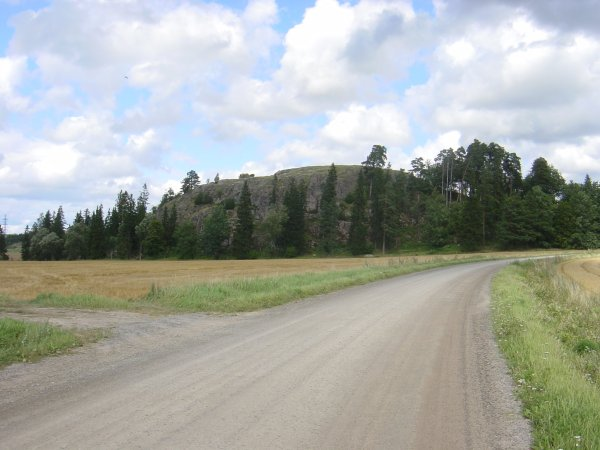
The section of the road in Lieto is a road museum and therefore remains unpaved. The rock in the background is a site of an ancient hill fort, the Old Castle of Lieto.

Hämeen Härkätie (lit. 'Oxen Road of Tavastia') is an ancient road in Finland, connecting Turku in Finland Proper to Hämeenlinna in Tavastia Proper. The 162 kilometers long road has been in use at the latest in the 9th century and in many parts it has been in use since. Today, Finnish national road 10 fulfills the same purpose as the connection between Turku and Hämeenlinna, but it follows the original route only near Turku.

== History ==
The Oxen Road links two major Iron Age settlement areas in Finland, the valley of the Aurajoki river and the Lake Vanaja region of Häme. Vanaja region was one of the main areas in Finland in prehistoric times to acquire articles for export, such as furs and hides. The Aurajoki river valley was the region where these exports passed through to the Baltic sea.

The road was a joint institution of several ancient parishes in Western Finland. The road passes through two ancient provinces, Lieto in Turku and ancient Vanaja in Häme which has probably required some kind of agreeing upon on the rights of transit. The road was also probably used to link other prehistorical provinces together.

== Etymology ==
The origin of the term "Hämeen härkätie" - the Oxen road of Tavastia is not known. The term occurs mainly in Häme at the far end of the road in folk poetry of the road-side parishes. The folk poetry in Finland proper exclude the term "Oxen road" with some exceptions in the environments of the Halikonlahti bay in present-day Salo. Halikonlahti bay has been traditionally seen as the ancient port of the Tavastians.

== Route ==
The first known description of the route of the road is made by Jaakko Teitti in 1556. At the time the road was 162 kilometers long and the route started from the Aura river valley and continued via the villages of Lieto, Tarvasjoki, Marttila, Koski, Somero, Letku, Porras and Renko continuing through sparsely populated uplands of Tammela to Häme Castle. Winter time winter roads were used and the route of the road varied on small degree. Journey from Turku to Häme took approximately 4–6 days. In 1938 the route was designated Finnish national road 10, but in 1962 a new road with a different route was built to replace Hämeen Härkätie as a new road 10. The route is currently scattered among multiple regional roads, private roads and streets. Parts have been designated as a scenic route for tourism purposes.

== Gallery ==
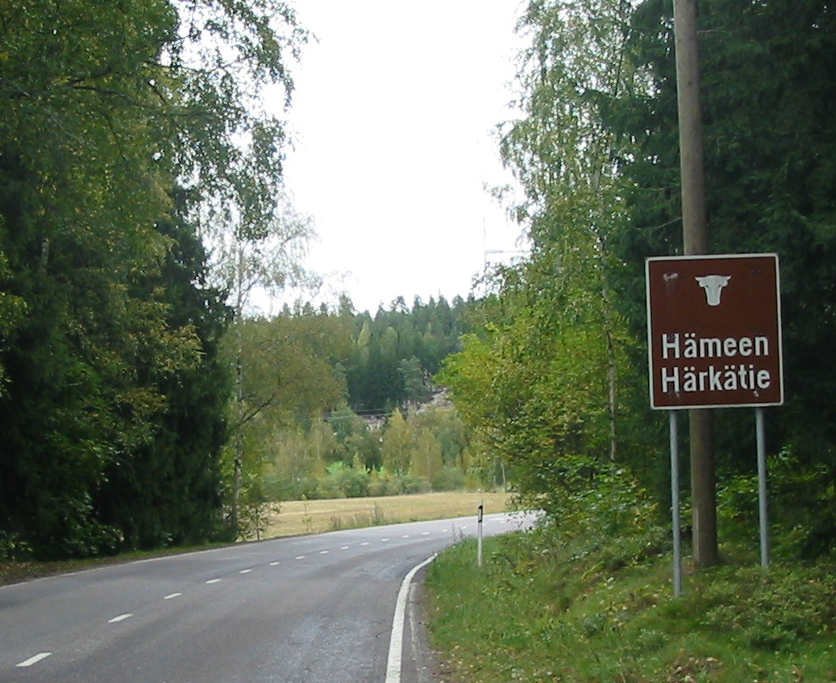
sign

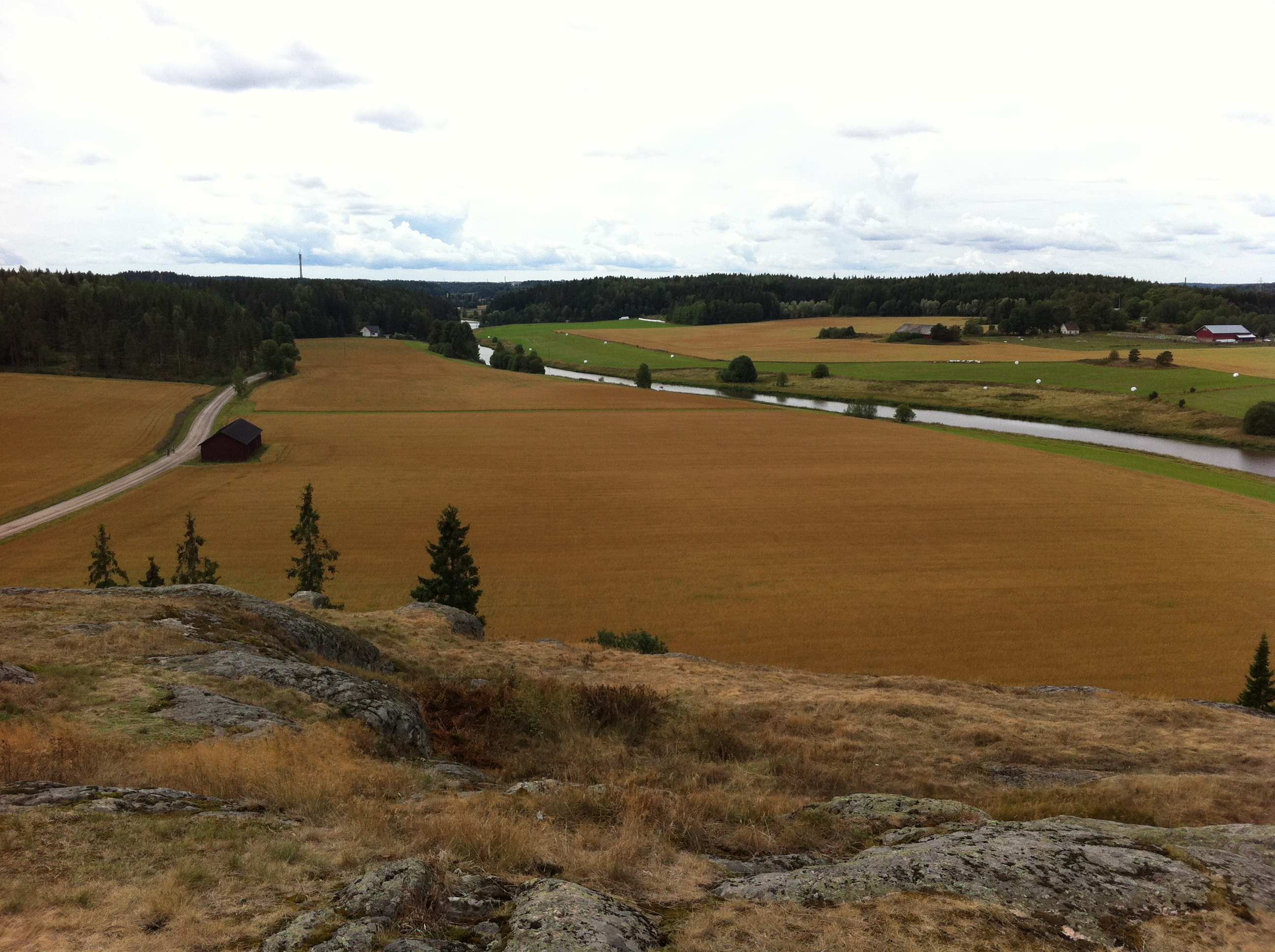
Lieto

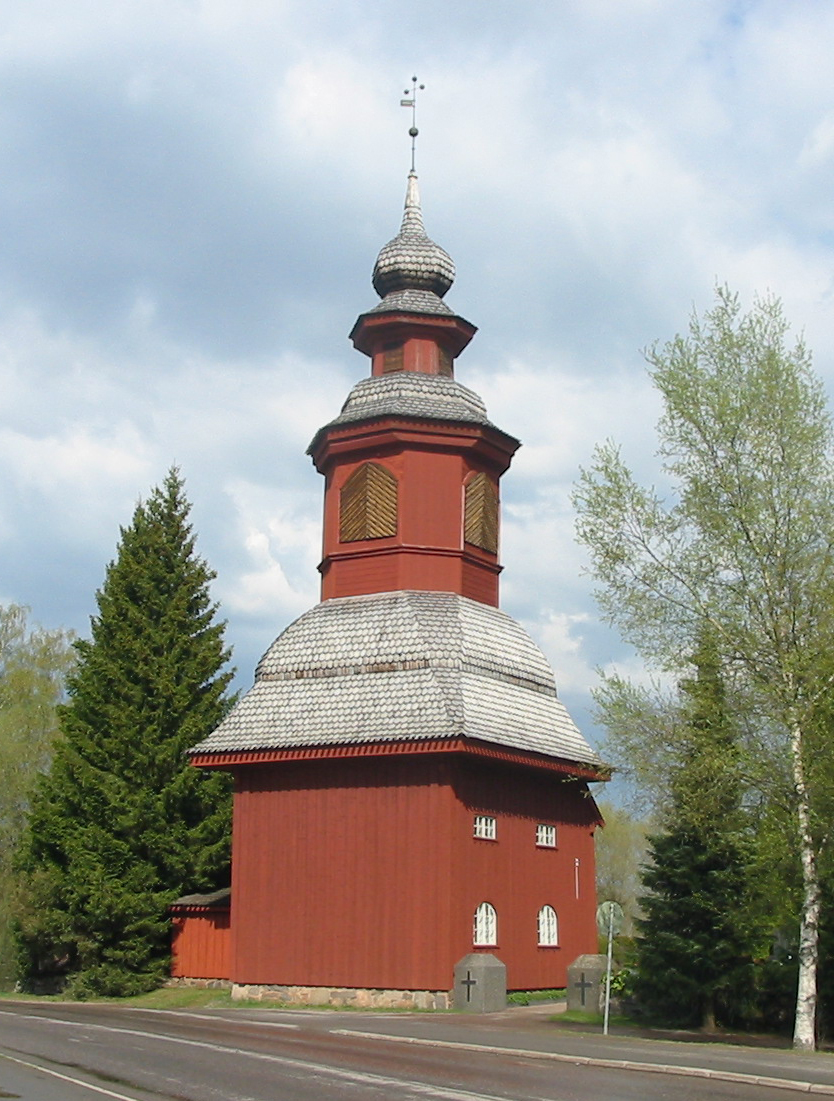
Koski Tl.

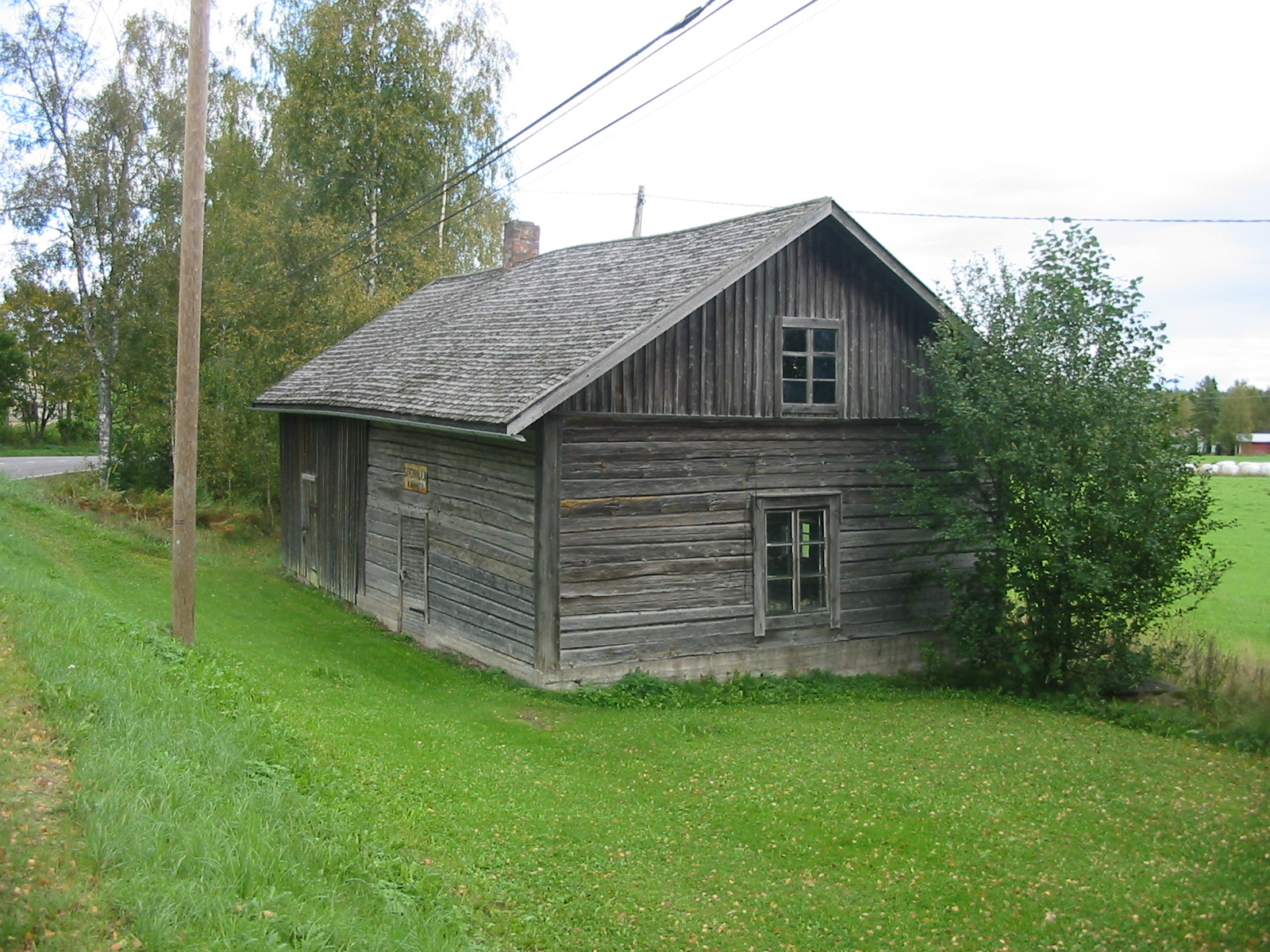
Kultela
