= Old Castle of Lieto =

Coordinates: 60°29′11″N 22°22′38″E

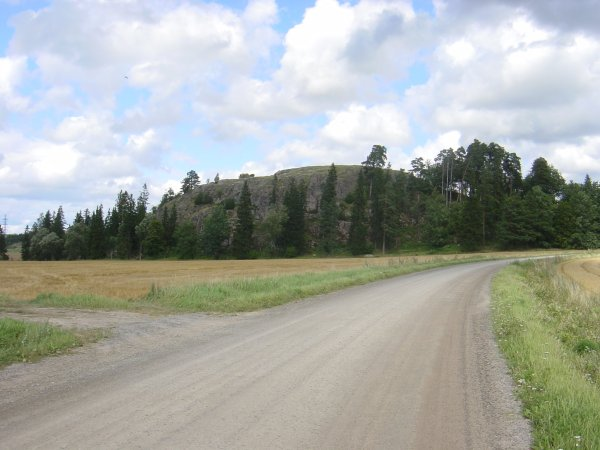
Old Castle of Lieto in August 2007 seen from the ancient road, Hämeen härkätie, which passes the hillfort site.

Old Castle of Lieto (Finnish: Liedon Vanhalinna) is a site of a hillfort in Lieto, Finland. It rises 55 meters above the sea level.

The original name of the castle is not known. According to excavations, the castle has been in use three times during its history, in the Late Bronze Age (1100–500 BCE) and in Middle Iron Age (500–700 CE). The third phase of the site between years 1000-1370 can be divided into two. According to the excavations the years 1000–1150 are marked with German money and prehistoric artefacts and the years 1200–1370 with Scandinavian bracteates and medieval artefacts. The hillfort was used by the local Finns proper population until 1170, when it was conquered most likely by the Swedes who possibly used it as a stronghold against Tavastians.

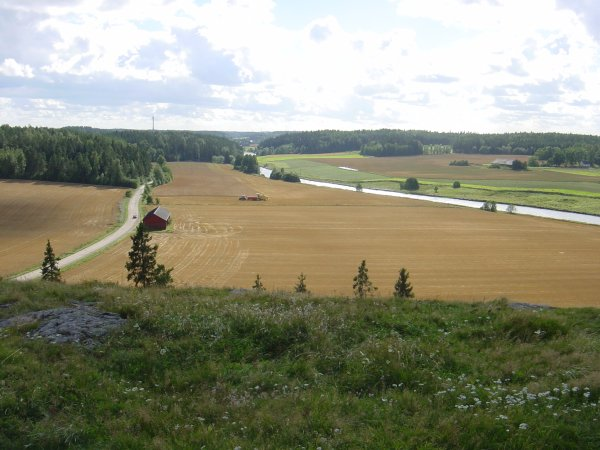
View from the Old castle of Lieto, Finland, in August 2007. View to the south from the castle rock. On the left the Hämeen härkätie. On the right the Aura River.

The steep hillside supported by fortifications on top of the hill provided a good defensive position. Constructions on the hillfort were mostly made of wood. In the latest phase bricks were used as well. Remains of 11 buildings have been found from the top of the hillfort. Earliest defensive structures have been dated to 500 BCE and an outer bailey was in use in the Middle Ages. Total of 14 arrowheads and 150 crossbow bolt heads have been found from the area as well as several spear heads which the oldest has been dated to 6th century. Also several traces of fire have been found from the hillfort. Earliest traces of fire have been dated to Migration Period and the latest to 1360s.

The castle was located between two ancient transport routes: Aura river and Hämeen härkätie leading to central Tavastia. Its importance decreased when the Turku castle was finished in beginning of the 14th century. Hence the name Old Castle of Lieto.

== Vanhalinna Museum ==
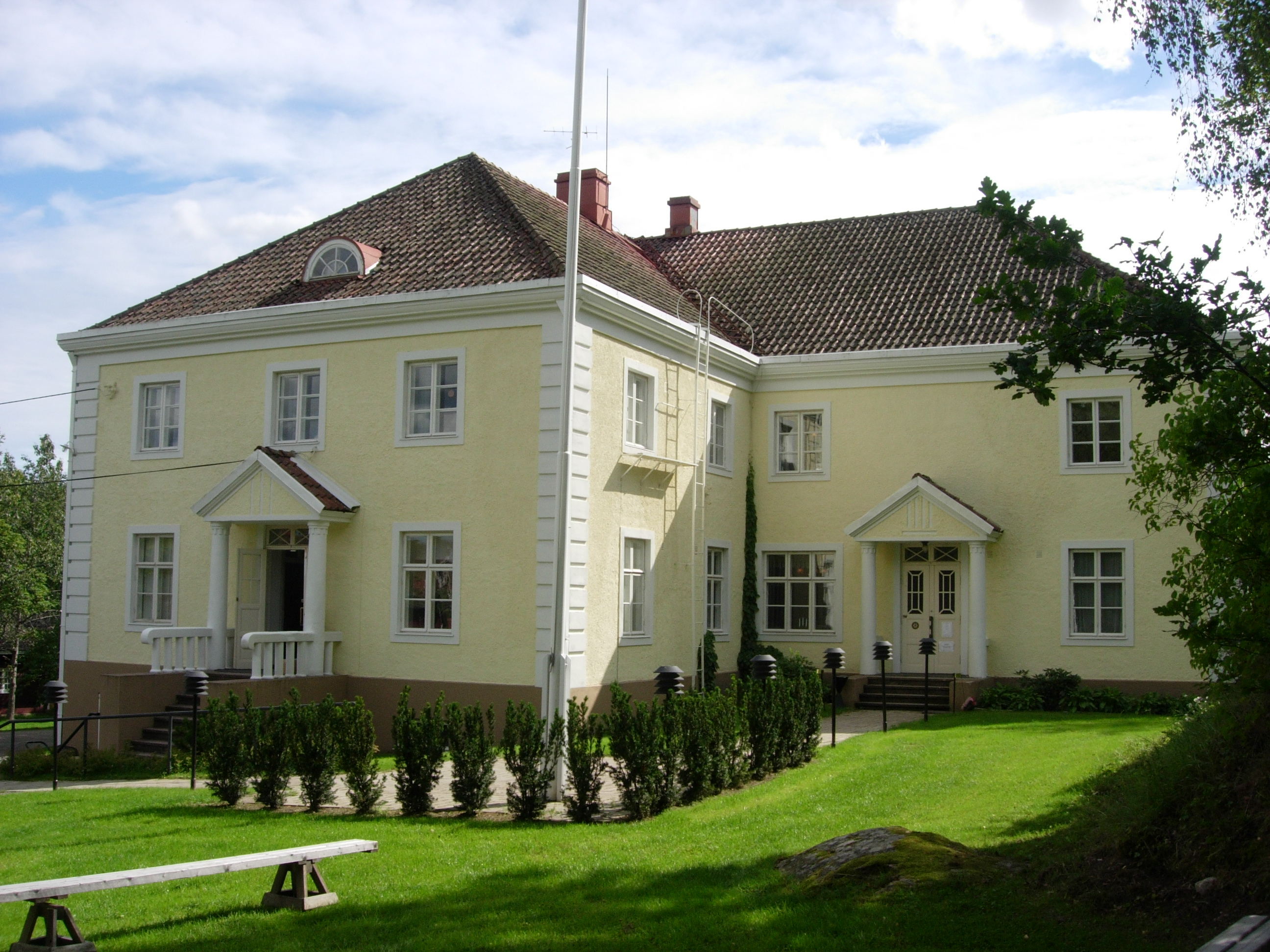
The Vanhalinna manor in Lieto which serves as a Museum.

The area is currently owned by the University of Turku which received it as a donation in the 1950s by the previous owners, Mauno and Ester Wanhalinna (the last name Wanhalinna is old Finnish spelling for "old castle") who had decorated the place as a manor home. In accordance to the donation charter, Vanhalinna also houses a museum with archaeological finds on display on eras of Varsinais-Suomi, starting from Stone Ages. Folk cultural department shows agrarian tools and life.
