= Koski Tl =

Koski Tl Koskis
- Municipality
- Kosken Tl kunta Koskis kommun
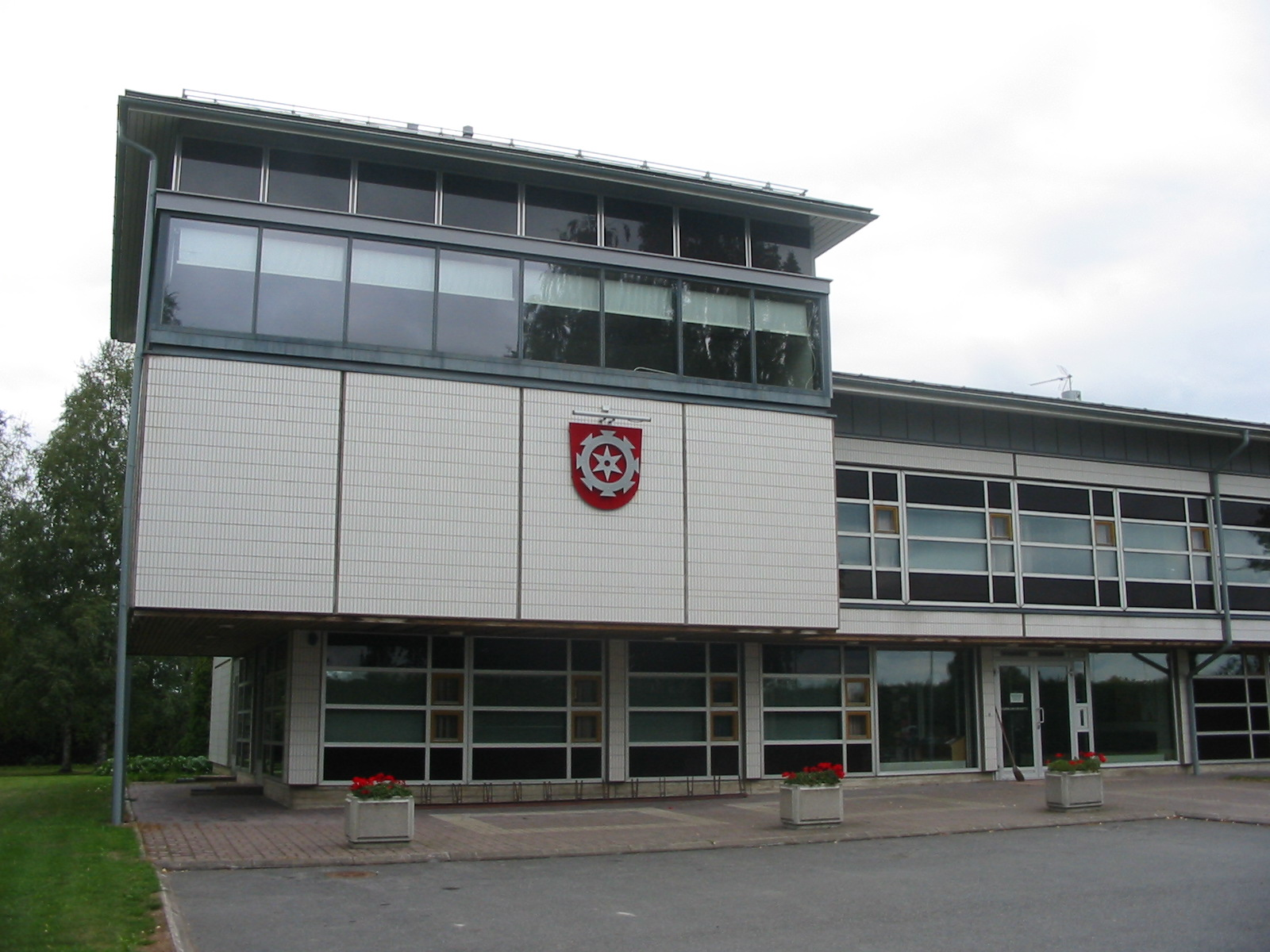
- Municipal hall of Koski

- Coat of arms

- Location of Koski Tl in Finland
- Interactive map of Koski Tl
- Coordinates: 60°39.3′N 023°08.5′E
- Country: Finland
- Region: Southwest Finland
- Sub-region: Loimaa
- Charter: 1869

Government
  - Municipal manager: Aimo Suikkanen

Area (2018-01-01)
  - Total: 192.42 km^{2} (74.29 sq mi)
  - Land: 191.5 km^{2} (73.9 sq mi)
  - Water: 0.96 km^{2} (0.37 sq mi)
  - Rank: 265th largest in Finland

Population (2025-12-31)
  - Total: 2,144
  - Rank: 247th largest in Finland
  - Density: 11.2/km^{2} (29/sq mi)

Population by native language
  - Finnish: 95.4% (official)
  - Swedish: 0.5%
  - Others: 4.1%

Population by age
  - 0 to 14: 13.9%
  - 15 to 64: 52.7%
  - 65 or older: 33.4%
- Time zone: UTC+02:00 (EET)
  - Summer (DST): UTC+03:00 (EEST)
- Climate: Dfc
- Website: koski.fi

Koski Tl (Finnish pronunciation: [ˈkoski]; Swedish: Koskis) is a municipality of Finland.

It is located in the Southwest Finland region and was part of the former province of Western Finland. The municipality has a population of 2,144 (31 December 2025) and covers an area of 192.42 square kilometres (74.29 sq mi) of which 0.96 km^{2} (0.37 sq mi) is water. The population density is 11.2 inhabitants per square kilometre (29/sq mi).

Tl in the name means the former province of Turku and Pori (Finnish: Turun ja Porin lääni). It was attached to the name to distinguish Koski Tl from another municipality named Koski, Koski Hl (Hl for the former province of Häme, Finnish: Hämeen lääni). Koski Hl was renamed Hämeenkoski in 1995 but Koski Tl has not changed its name.

Koski is unilingually Finnish.

Koski's neighbouring municipalities are Loimaa, Marttila, Pöytyä, Salo, Somero and Ypäjä.

== Sights ==
Hämeen Härkätie runs through Koski and it crosses the Paimio River in the center of Koski. The church of Koski was designed by architect Toivo Paatela and it was completed in 1935. There is also an observation tower near the highest points of Hevonlinna ridge and Hevonlinnanjärvi.

Yrjö Liipola Art Museum is exhibiting Yrjö Liipola's art collection.

== Gallery ==
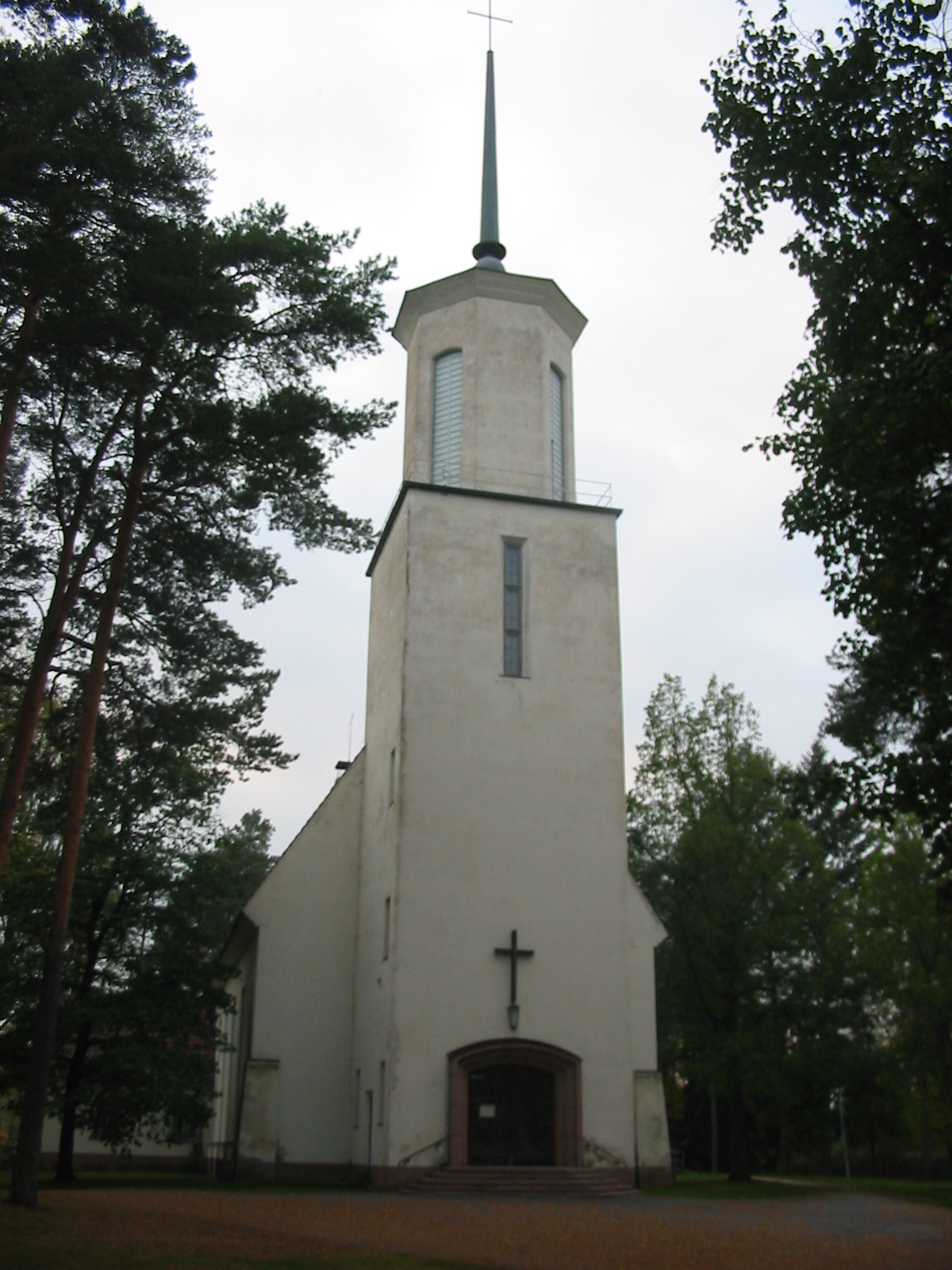
Koski church

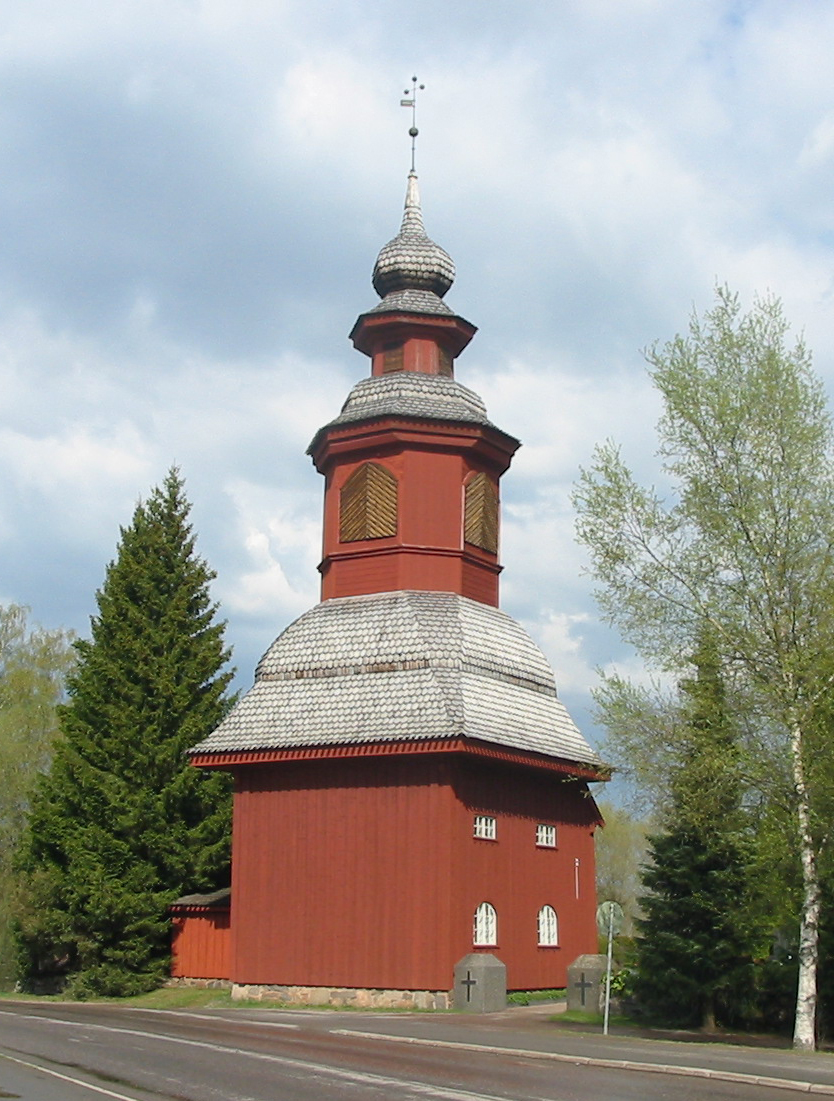
Old church bell tower

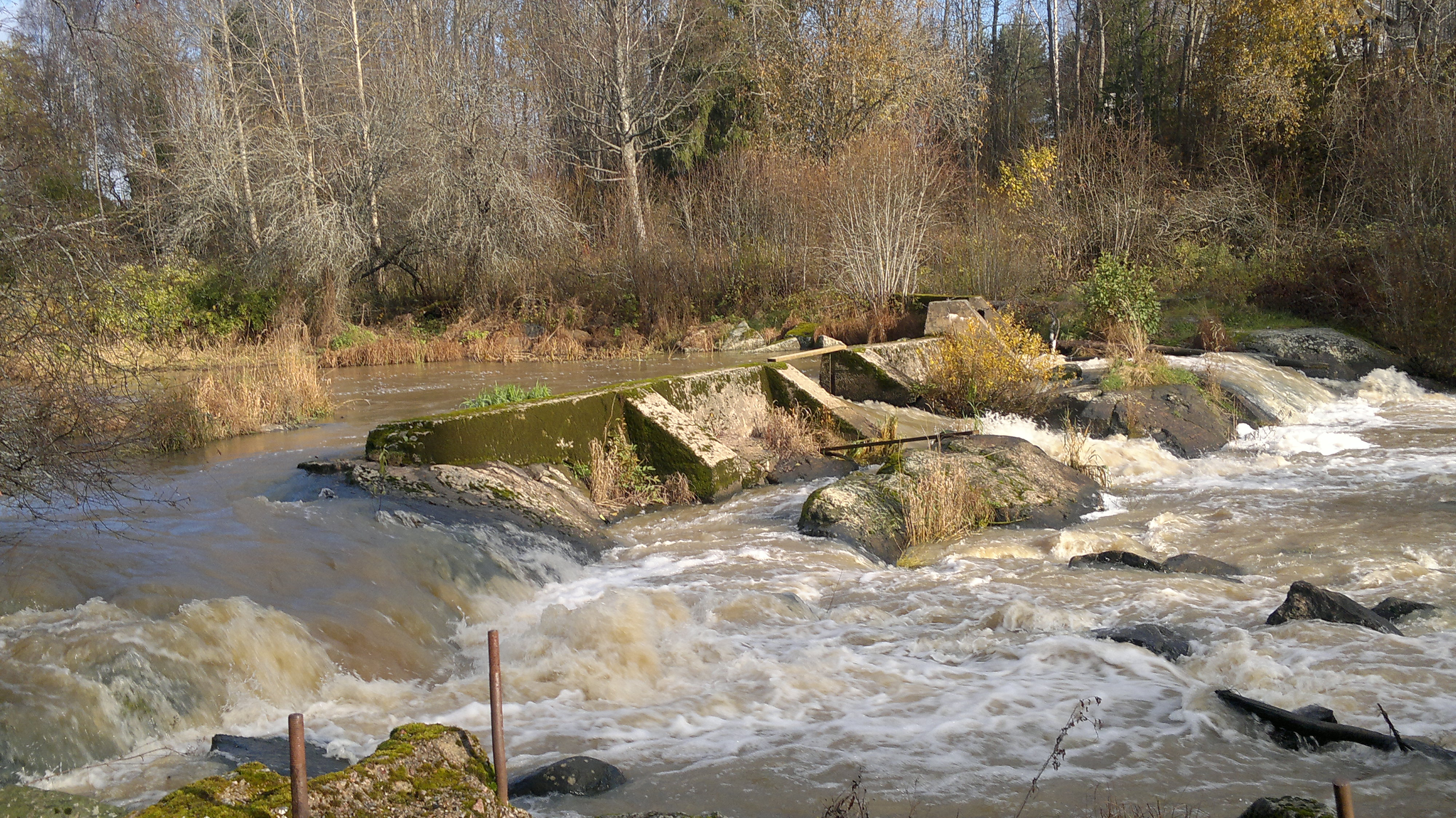
Koski rapids
