= Hämeenkoski =

- Former municipality
- Hämeenkosken kunta Hämeenkoski kommun
- Coat of arms

- Location of Hämeenkoski in Finland
- Coordinates: 61°01.5′N 025°09′E
- Country: Finland
- Region: Päijät-Häme
- Sub-region: Lahti sub-region
- Charter: 1865
- Consolidated: 2016

Government
  - Municipal manager: Kari Mustonen

Area
  - Total: 195.62 km^{2} (75.53 sq mi)
  - Land: 187.76 km^{2} (72.49 sq mi)
  - Water: 7.86 km^{2} (3.03 sq mi)

Population (2015-06-30)
  - Total: 2,125
  - Density: 11.32/km^{2} (29.31/sq mi)
- Time zone: UTC+2 (EET)
  - Summer (DST): UTC+3 (EEST)
- Website: www.hameenkoski.fi

Hämeenkoski (Finnish pronunciation: [ˈhæmeːŋˌkoski]; Koski Hl until 1995, see Koski Tl) is a former municipality of Finland. It was merged to the municipality of Hollola on 1 January 2016.

It is located in the province of Southern Finland and is part of the Päijät-Häme region. The municipality had a population of 2,125 (30 June 2015) and covered an area of 195.62 km^{2} (75.53 sq mi) of which 7.86 km^{2} (3.03 sq mi) was water. The population density was 11.3176/km^{2} (29.313/sq mi). The municipality was unilingually Finnish.

Lake Pääjärvi is situated at the border between Hämeenkoski and Hämeenlinna (formerly Lammi).

== History ==
Hämeenkoski was originally known as Koski. It was initially a part of the Lammi administrative division and the Hauho parish. Lammi became a separate parish in the beginning of the 15th century or slightly earlier. Koski was first mentioned as a separate parish in 1410, but it was merged into Lammi as a chapel community in 1540. The chapel was also known as Etola after another village in the area. Koski became a separate parish from Lammi in 1870. The name Hämeen-Koski was first suggested for the parish in 1897 by Väino Wallin to distinguish it from Koski Tl, at the time still a part of Marttila. Koski Hl was renamed Hämeenkoski in 1995.

Hämeenkoski was consolidated with Hollola in 2016.

== Notable people ==
Juho Kusti Paasikivi (1870–1956), the seventh President of Finland, was born in the Huljala village located approximately 5 kilometres (3.1 mi) southeast of the former municipal center.

== See also ==
- Finnish national road 12
