= Loimaa sub-region =

Loimaa sub-region Loimaan seutukunta
- Sub-region
- Country: Finland
- Region: Southwest Finland
- Capital: Loimaa

Population (2011)
  - Total: 37,107
- Time zone: UTC+2 (EET)
  - Summer (DST): UTC+3 (EEST)

Loimaa sub-region is a subdivision of Southwest Finland and one of the sub-regions of Finland since 2009. Loimaa sub-region is one of the most agricultural regions of Southwest Finland's subregions. The region has an estimate of 37 thousand inhabitants.

== Municipalities ==
| Coat of arms | Municipality | Population | Land area (km^{2}) | Density (/km^{2}) | Finnish speakers | Swedish speakers | Other speakers |
|---|---|---|---|---|---|---|---|
| Coat of arms of Aura, Finland | Aura | 3,937 | 95 | 41 | 96 % | 0 % | 3 % |
| Coat of arms of Koski Tl | Koski Tl | 2,144 | 192 | 11 | 95 % | 0 % | 4 % |
| Coat of arms of Loimaa | Loimaa | 15,124 | 848 | 18 | 94 % | 0 % | 6 % |
| Coat of arms of Marttila | Marttila | 1,890 | 195 | 10 | 96 % | 1 % | 3 % |
| Coat of arms of Oripää | Oripää | 1,264 | 118 | 11 | 90 % | 0 % | 10 % |
| Coat of arms of Pöytyä | Pöytyä | 7,903 | 750 | 11 | 94 % | 1 % | 5 % |
| | Total | 32,262 | 2,198 | 15 | 94 % | 0 % | 5 % |
