= Pettinen =

Pettinen is a Finnish surname. Notable people with the surname include:

- August Pettinen (1857–1914), Finnish missionary
- Tomi Pettinen (born 1977), Finnish ice hockey player
