= Aura, Finland =

Aura
- Municipality
- Auran kunta Aura kommun
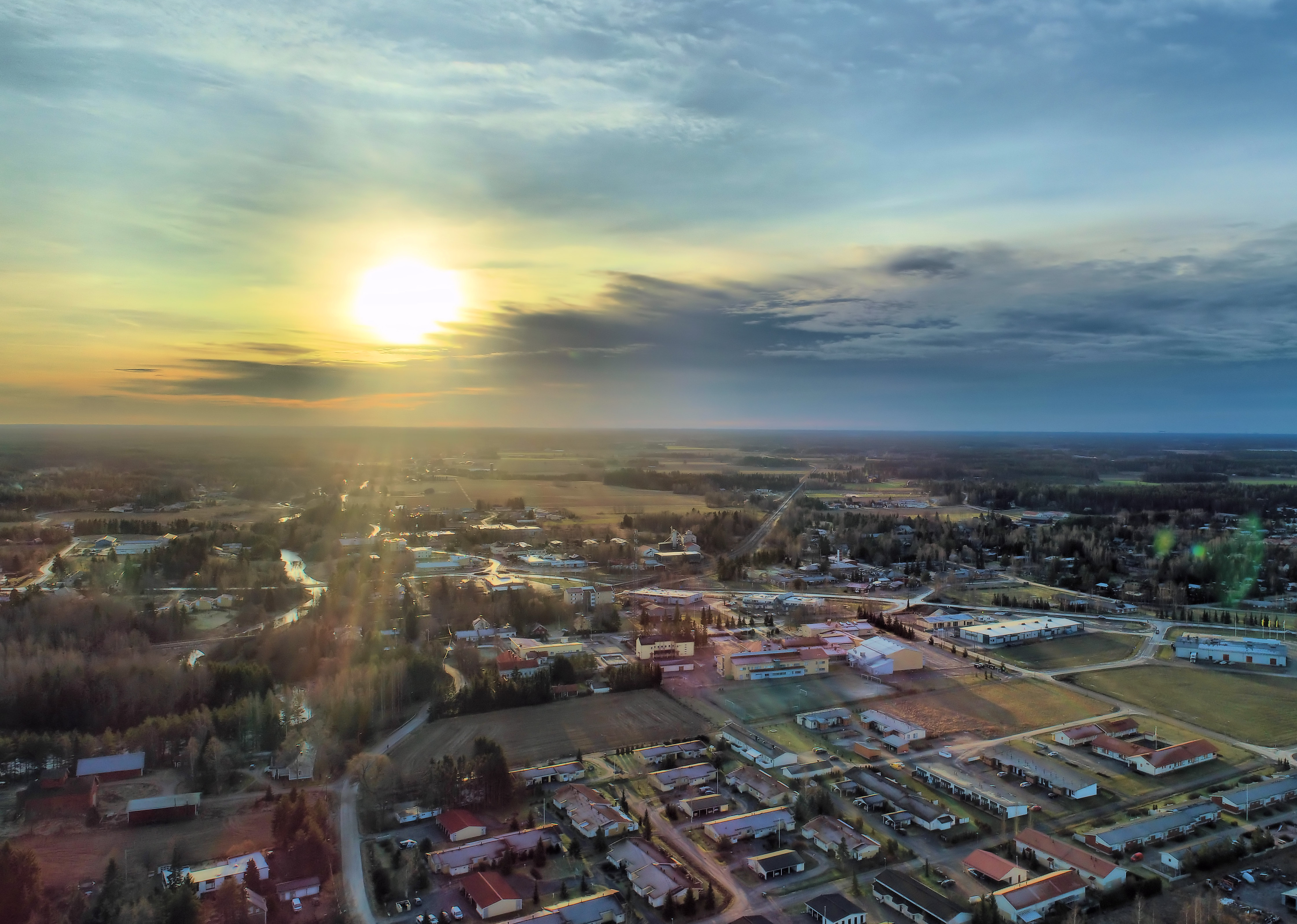

- Coat of arms

- Location of Aura in Finland
- Interactive map of Aura
- Coordinates: 60°39′N 022°35′E
- Country: Finland
- Region: Southwest Finland
- Sub-region: Loimaa
- Charter: 1917

Government
  - Municipal manager: Jari Kesäniemi

Area (2018-01-01)
  - Total: 95.58 km^{2} (36.90 sq mi)
  - Land: 95.01 km^{2} (36.68 sq mi)
  - Water: 0.59 km^{2} (0.23 sq mi)
  - Rank: 301st largest in Finland

Population (2025-12-31)
  - Total: 3,937
  - Rank: 193rd largest in Finland
  - Density: 41.44/km^{2} (107.3/sq mi)

Population by native language
  - Finnish: 96.4% (official)
  - Swedish: 0.4%
  - Others: 3.2%

Population by age
  - 0 to 14: 19%
  - 15 to 64: 60.2%
  - 65 or older: 20.8%
- Time zone: UTC+02:00 (EET)
  - Summer (DST): UTC+03:00 (EEST)
- Climate: Dfb
- Website: aura.fi

Aura (Finnish pronunciation: [ˈɑu̯rɑ]) is a municipality of Finland. The name derives from the river Aura and the plough (aura in Finnish) reminiscent shape of the municipality. The municipality was established in 1917 from parts of Lieto and Pöytyä.

It is part of the Varsinais-Suomi region. The municipality has a population of 3,937 (31 December 2025) and covers an area of 95.58 square kilometres (36.90 sq mi) of which 0.59 km^{2} (0.23 sq mi) is water. The population density is 41.44 inhabitants per square kilometre (107.3/sq mi).

The municipality is unilingually Finnish.

== Geography ==
Aura is located on the middle reaches of the Aura River, and the river divides the municipality into two distinct parts. The eastern side is dominated by moraine, and the terrain is uneven, with the highest hills reaching over 80 meters above sea level. The western side of the river is lowland and the soil is mostly clay.

=== Villages ===
In 1967, Aura had 23 legally recognized villages (henkikirjakylät):

- Auvainen
- Hypöinen
- Ihava
- Järvenoja
- Järykselä
- Kaerla
- Karviainen
- Kinnarla
- Kuuskoski
- Käetty
- Lahto
- Laukkaniitty
- Leikola
- Leinikkala
- Leppäkoski
- Paimala
- Pitkäniitty
- Prunkkala
- Puho
- Seppälä
- Sikilä
- Simola
- Viilaila

== History ==
Aura, Lieto and Tarvasjoki.

The area was initially a part of the Lieto parish. A church was built in the village of Prunkkala in 1636, forming a new chapel community. In 1908, an order to separate Prunkkala from Lieto was made. The villages of Kuuskoski, Hypöinen, Viilala and Lahto were transferred to it from Pöytyä. The parish became fully independent in 1917 under the current name Aura, after the Aura train station and the community that had formed around it in the late 19th century.

== Demographics ==
In 2020, 19.0% of the population of Aura was under the age of 15, 60.2% were aged 15 to 64, and 20.8% were over the age of 65. The average age was 42.0, under the national average of 43.4 and regional average of 44.0. Speakers of Finnish made up 96.8% of the population and speakers of Swedish made up 0.6%, while the share of speakers of foreign languages was 2.6%. Foreign nationals made up 2.1% of the total population.

The chart below, describing the development of the total population of Aura from 1975-2020, encompasses the municipality's area as of 2021.

Historical population

Year	Pop.	±% p.a.
1975	2,338	—
1980	2,470	+1.10%
1985	2,692	+1.74%
1990	2,960	+1.92%
1995	3,288	+2.12%

Year	Pop.	±% p.a.
2000	3,338	+0.30%
2005	3,699	+2.08%
2010	3,911	+1.12%
2015	3,986	+0.38%
2020	3,959	−0.14%

Source: Statistics Finland

=== Urban areas ===
In 2019, out of the total population of 3,941, 2,705 people lived in urban areas and 1,166 in sparsely populated areas, while the coordinates of 70 people were unknown. This made Aura's degree of urbanization 69.9%. The urban population in the municipality was divided between two urban areas as follows:

#	Urban area	Population
1	Aura railway station area	2,700
2	Lieto railway station area	5 (Note: The Lieto railway station area has a total population of 1,177, and in addition to Aura, reaches the municipality of Lieto (1,172 residents).)

== Economy ==
In 2018, 5.2% of the workforce of Aura worked in primary production (agriculture, forestry and fishing), 34.9% in secondary production (e.g. manufacturing, construction and infrastructure), and 57.6% in services. In 2019, the unemployment rate was 5.7%, and the share of pensioners in the population was 23.7%.

The ten largest employers in Aura in 2019 were as follows:

- Municipality of Aura, 138 employees
- Reka Kumi Oy, 63 еmployees
- Turun Osuuskauppa, 55 employees
- Oy WW-Offshore Ab, 41 employees
- Aurajoki Oy, 40 employees
- Humana Hoiva Oy, 37 employees
- JPV-Engineering Oy, 31 employees
- Criminal Sanctions Agency, 30 employees
- Posti Oy, 28 employees
- Pilke päiväkodit Oy, 21 employees

== See also ==
- Aura River
- Finnish national road 9
