= Marttila =

Marttila S:t Mårtens
- Municipality
- Marttilan kunta S:t Mårtens kommun
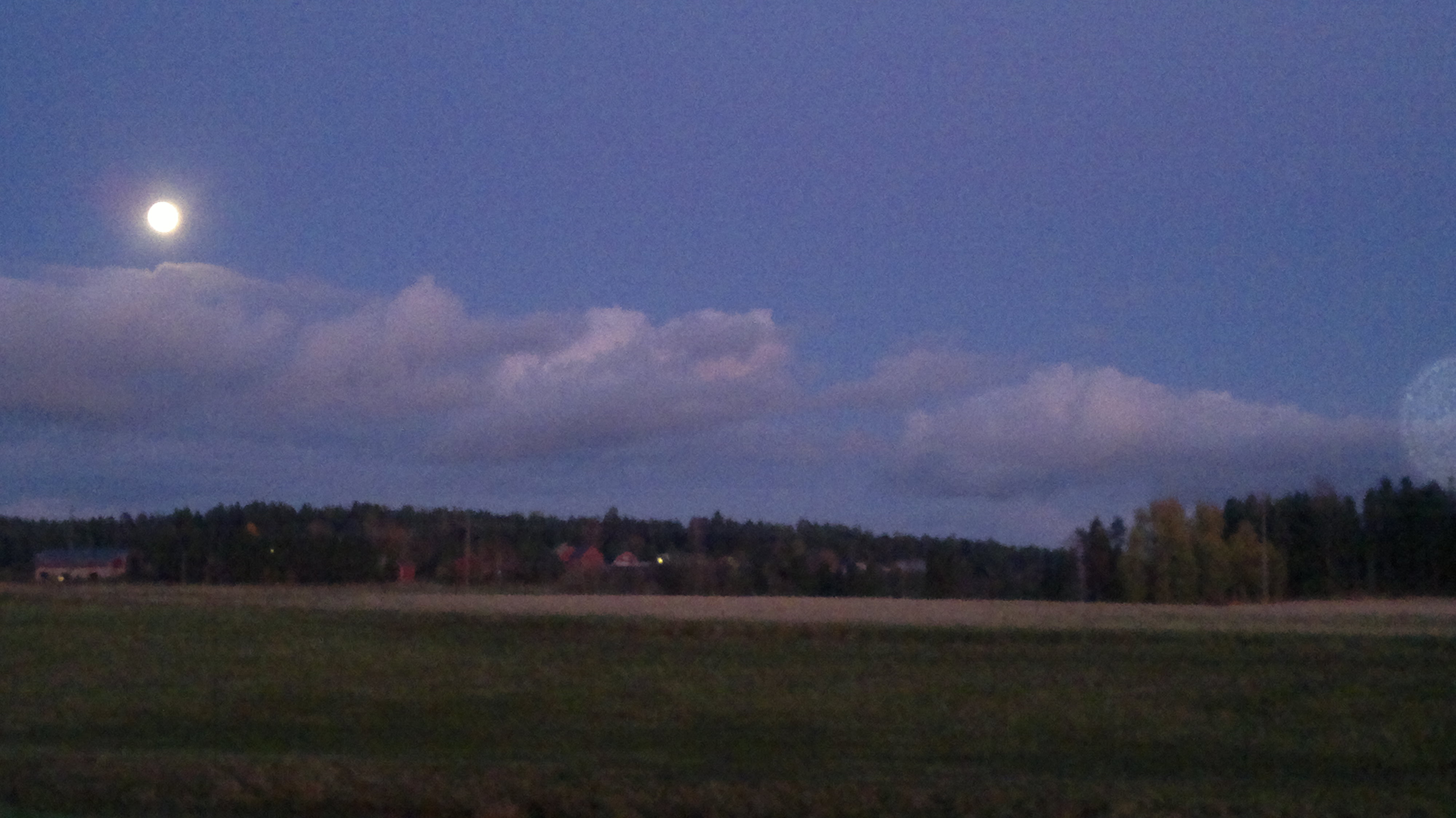
- A countryside of Marttila

- Coat of arms

- Location of Marttila in Finland
- Interactive map of Marttila
- Coordinates: 60°35′N 022°54′E
- Country: Finland
- Region: Southwest Finland
- Sub-region: Loimaa
- Charter: 1409
- Named for: Martin of Tours

Government
  - Municipal manager: Anne Ahtiainen

Area (2018-01-01)
  - Total: 195.99 km^{2} (75.67 sq mi)
  - Land: 195.31 km^{2} (75.41 sq mi)
  - Water: 0.71 km^{2} (0.27 sq mi)
  - Rank: 264th largest in Finland

Population (2025-12-31)
  - Total: 1,890
  - Rank: 261st largest in Finland
  - Density: 9.68/km^{2} (25.1/sq mi)

Population by native language
  - Finnish: 95.8% (official)
  - Swedish: 1%
  - Others: 3.3%

Population by age
  - 0 to 14: 15.9%
  - 15 to 64: 56.3%
  - 65 or older: 27.8%
- Time zone: UTC+02:00 (EET)
  - Summer (DST): UTC+03:00 (EEST)
- Climate: Dfc
- Website: marttila.fi

Marttila (Finnish: [ˈmɑrtːilɑ]; Swedish: S:t Mårtens, i.e. "Saint Martin's") is a municipality of Finland. It is located in the province of Western Finland and is part of the Southwest Finland region. The municipality has a population of 1,890 (31 December 2025) and covers an area of 195.99 square kilometres (75.67 sq mi) of which 0.71 km^{2} (0.27 sq mi) is water. The population density is 9.68 inhabitants per square kilometre (25.1/sq mi).

The municipality is unilingually Finnish.

Marttila's neighbouring municipalities are Koski Tl, Lieto, Loimaa, Paimio, Pöytyä and Salo.

== History ==
During the Swedish domestic war regarding who was to be king, an important battle took place here 29 August 1599. Troops under Axel Kurck, supporting king Sigismund were defeated by troops supported duke Karl, soon to be king Karl IX. Karl more or less already ruled Sweden and what is Finland nowadays, and Sigismund were based in Poland. There is a memorial, erected 1934, to be seen in Marttila. Marttila is along what at that time was called "Tavastlands Oxväg", in Finnish now posted as "Hämeen Härkätie", which in English translates to "Oxroad of Häme".

== Notable people ==
- Sirkka-Liisa Anttila (born 1943), politician; the former Minister of Agriculture and Forestry
- Lauri Heikkilä (born 1957), politician
- Simo Laaksonen (born 1998), racing driver

== Gallery ==
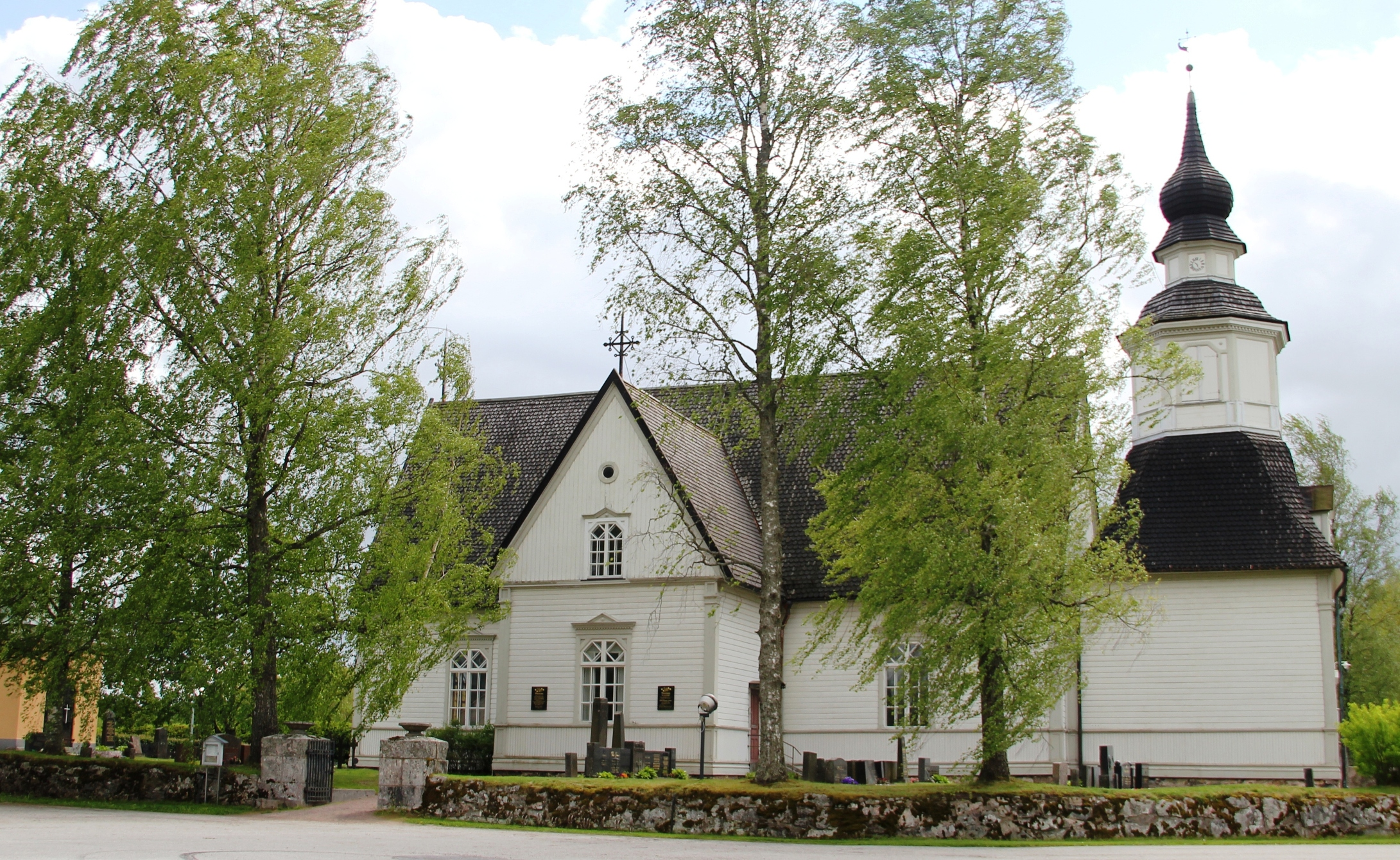
Church

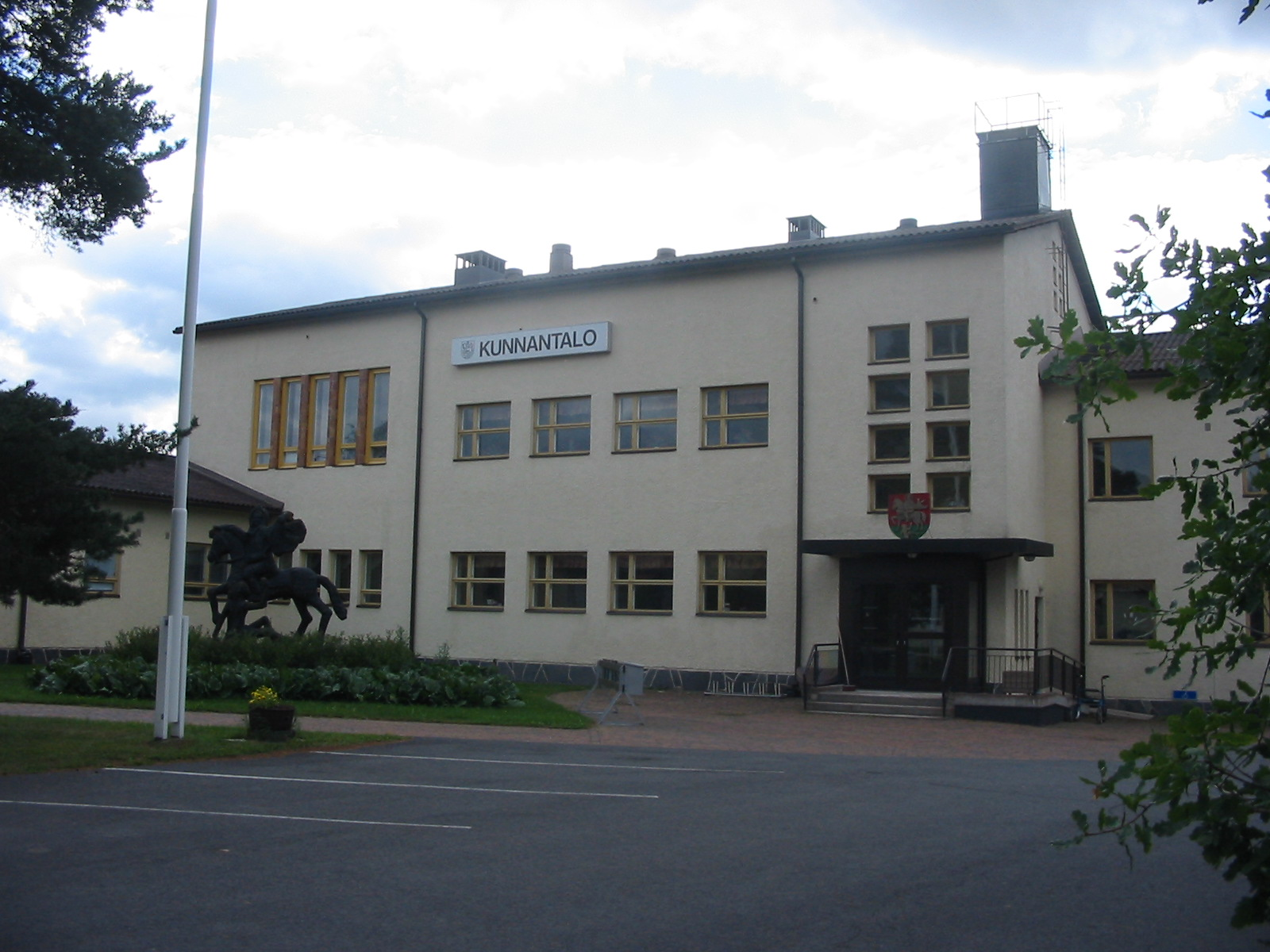
Borough hall

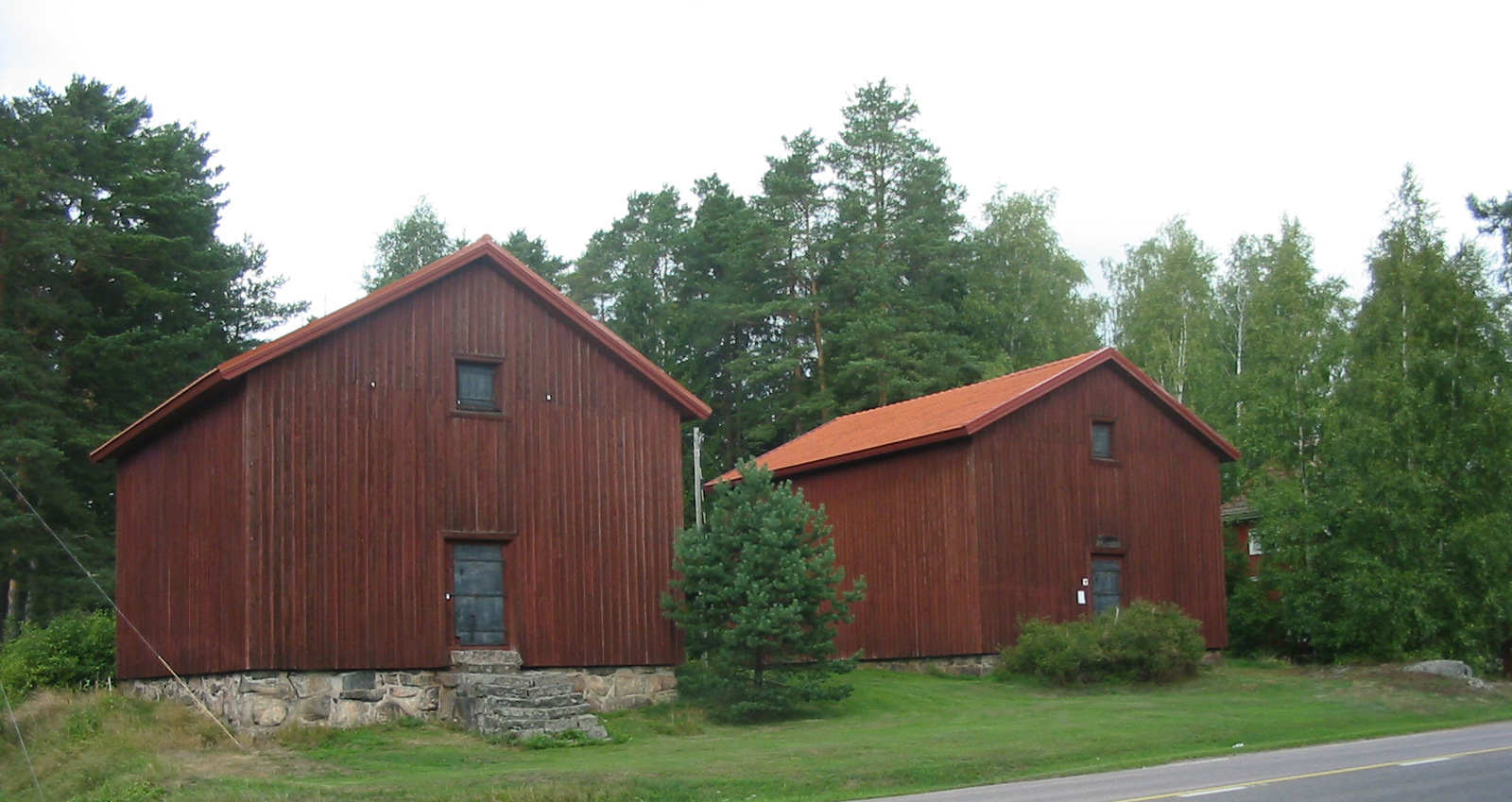
Lainamakasiinit

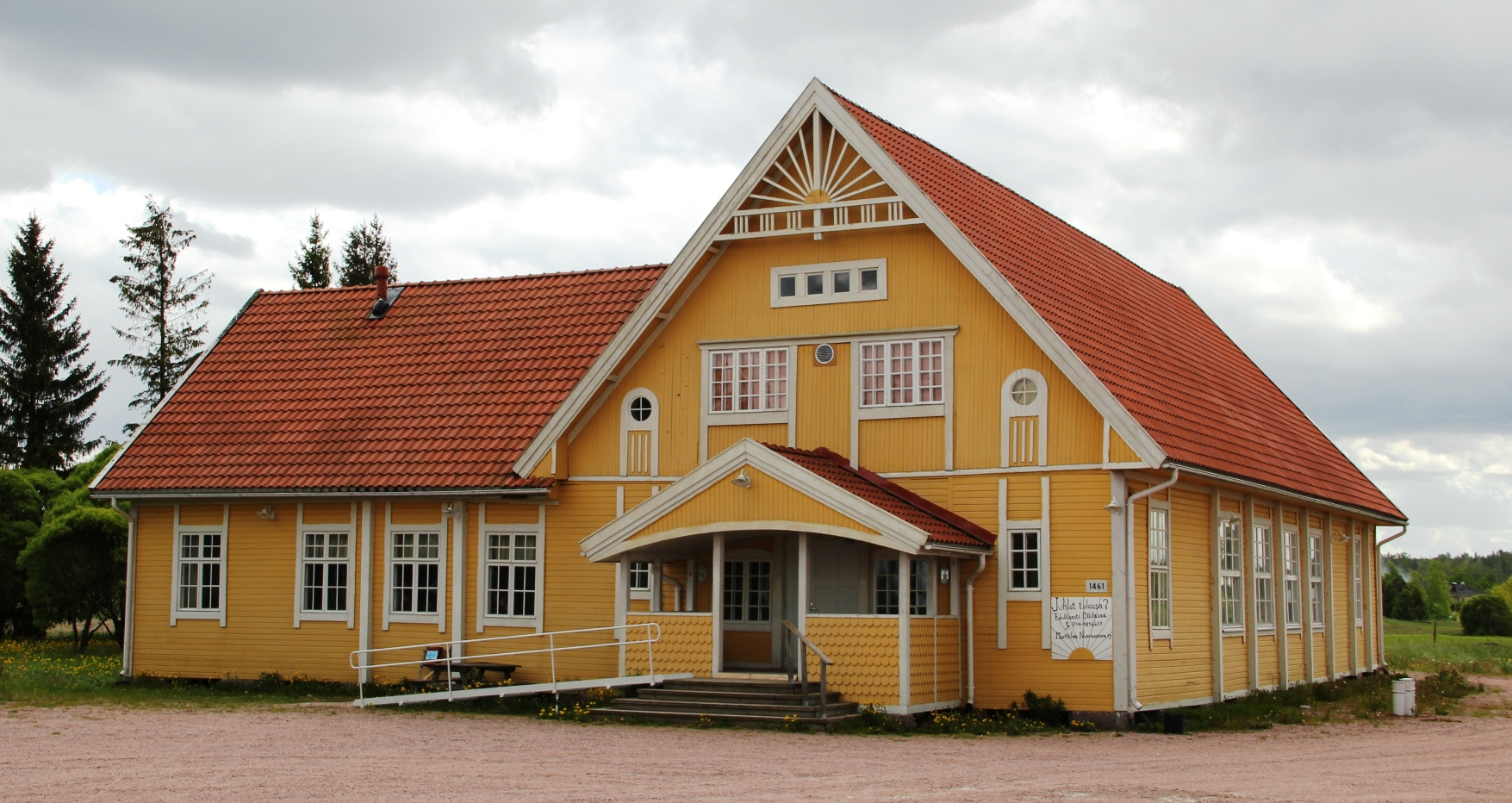
Nuorisoseurantalo
