= Tarvasjoki =

- Former municipality
- Tarvasjoen kunta Tarvasjoki kommun
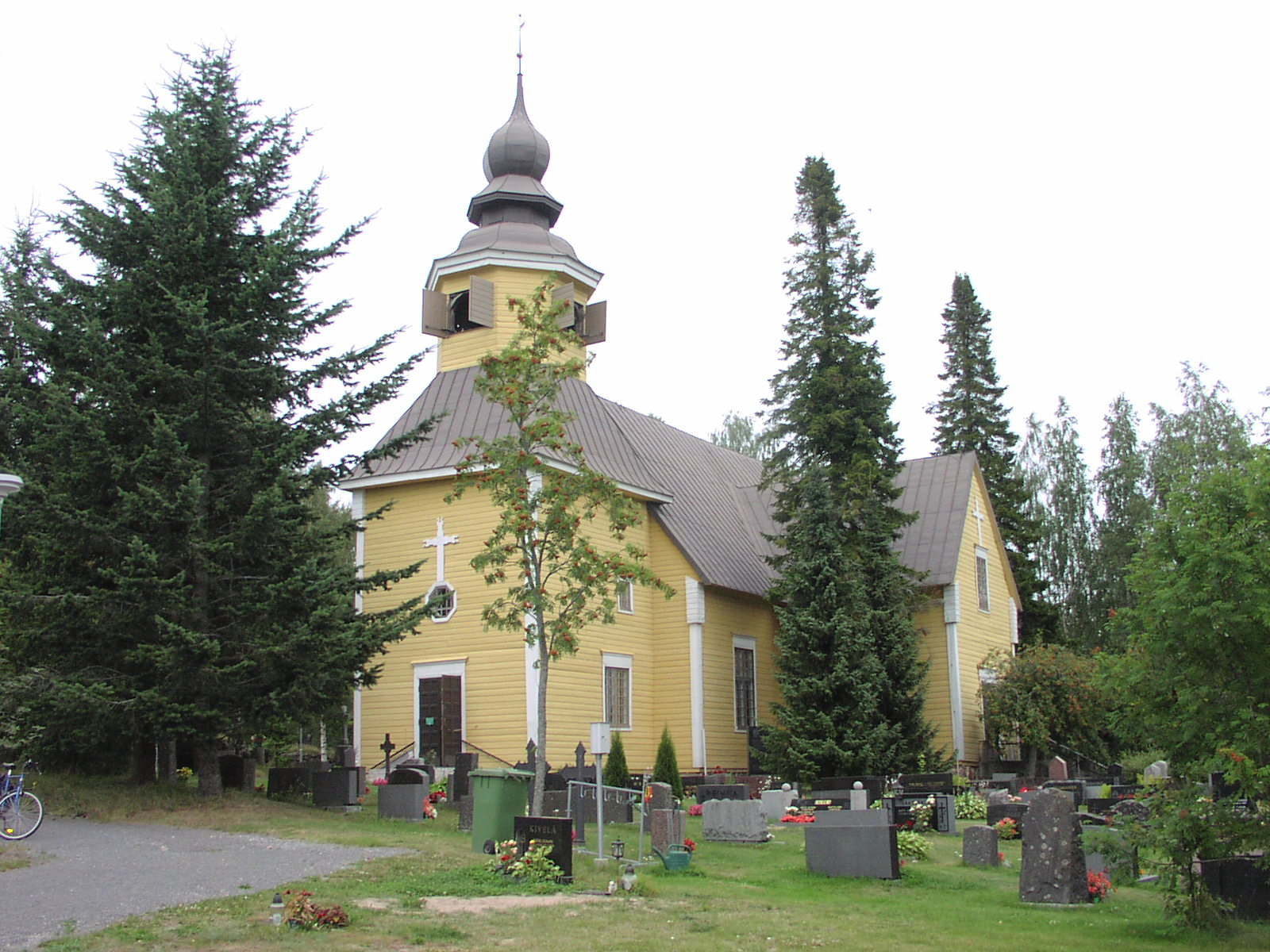
- Tarvasjoki Church

- Coat of arms

- Location of Tarvasjoki in Finland
- Coordinates: 60°35′N 022°44′E
- Country: Finland
- Region: Southwest Finland
- Sub-region: Loimaa sub-region
- Charter: 1869
- Merged: 2015

Government
  - Municipal manager: Oili Paavola

Area
  - Total: 102.41 km^{2} (39.54 sq mi)
  - Land: 101.96 km^{2} (39.37 sq mi)
  - Water: 0.45 km^{2} (0.17 sq mi)

Population (2014-11-30)
  - Total: 1,959
- Time zone: UTC+2 (EET)
  - Summer (DST): UTC+3 (EEST)
- Climate: Dfc
- Website: www.tarvasjoki.fi

Tarvasjoki (Finnish pronunciation: [ˈtɑrʋɑsˌjoki]) is a former municipality in the region of Southwest Finland, in Finland. It was merged with the municipality of Lieto on 1 January 2015.

The municipality had a population of 1,959 (30 November 2014) and it covered an area of 102.41 square kilometres (39.54 sq mi) of which 0.45 square kilometres (0.17 sq mi) was water. The population density was 19.21 inhabitants per square kilometre (49.8/sq mi).

The municipality was unilingually Finnish.

== Name ==
The name part joki means "river". The Tarvas part of the name originally referred to wild animals that were hunted, for example aurochs (wild cattle) and roe deer.

== Villages ==
Eura, Horrinen, Hungerla, Jauhola, Juva, Kallela, Karhula, Killala, Kirkonkylä, Kättylä, Liedonperä, Mäentaka, Satopää, Seppälä, Suitsula, Suurila, Takamaa, Tiensuu, Tuomarla, Tuorila, Tyllilä, Yrjönkylä.

== Famous people from Tarvasjoki ==
- Gustaf Mauritz Armfelt, (1757 in Juva, Tarvasjoki – 1814) a Finnish-Swedish-Russian courtier and diplomat.
