= Pöytyä =

- Municipality
- Pöytyän kunta Pöytyä kommun
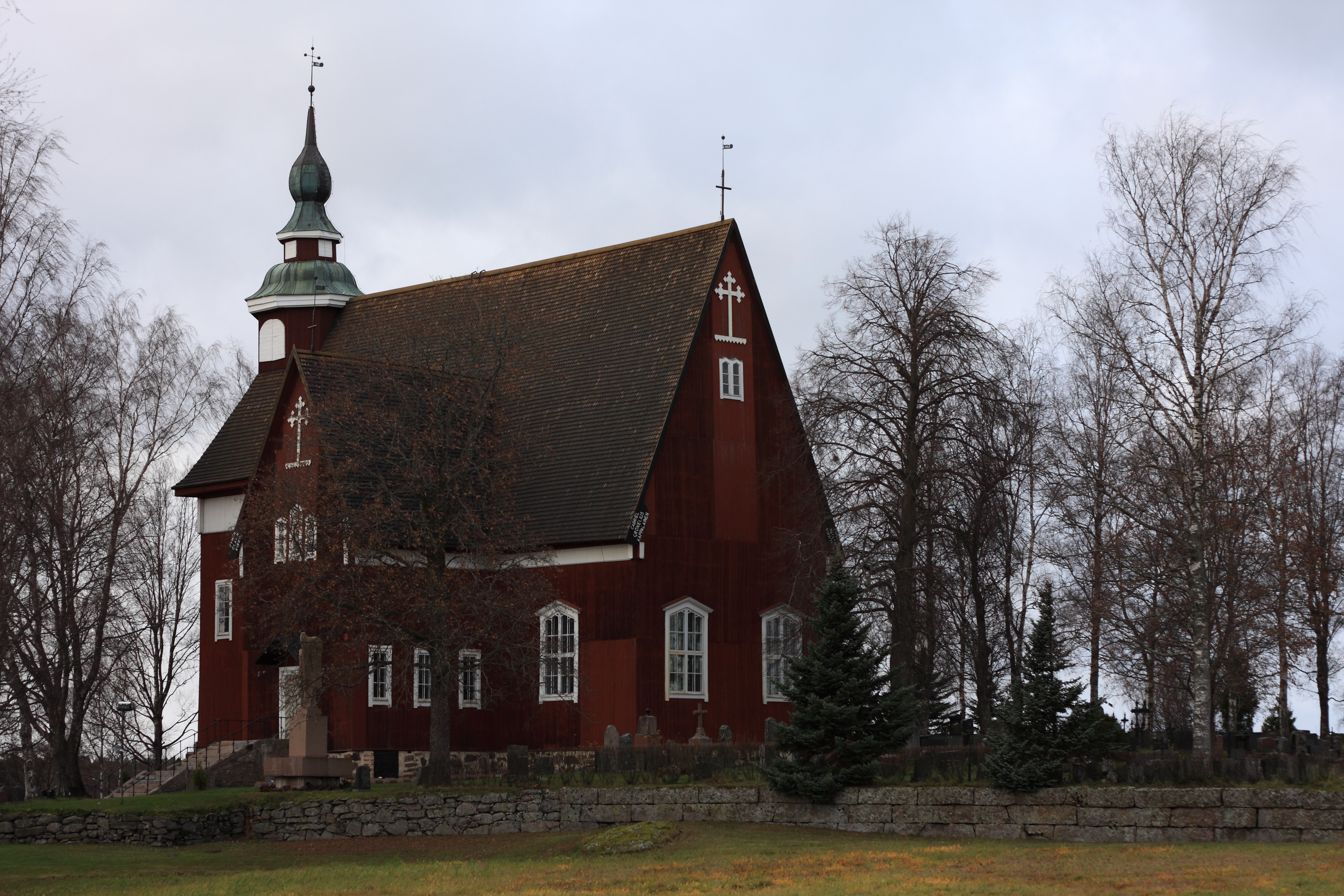
- Yläne Church

- Coat of arms

- Location of Pöytyä in Finland
- Interactive map of Pöytyä
- Coordinates: 60°43′N 022°36′E
- Country: Finland
- Region: Southwest Finland
- Sub-region: Loimaa

Government
  - Municipal manager: Kari Jokela

Area (2018-01-01)
  - Total: 773.69 km^{2} (298.72 sq mi)
  - Land: 749.97 km^{2} (289.57 sq mi)
  - Water: 23.68 km^{2} (9.14 sq mi)
  - Rank: 113th largest in Finland

Population (2025-12-31)
  - Total: 7,903
  - Rank: 118th largest in Finland
  - Density: 10.54/km^{2} (27.3/sq mi)

Population by native language
  - Finnish: 94.1% (official)
  - Swedish: 0.5%
  - Others: 5.4%

Population by age
  - 0 to 14: 17.5%
  - 15 to 64: 56.9%
  - 65 or older: 25.6%
- Time zone: UTC+02:00 (EET)
  - Summer (DST): UTC+03:00 (EEST)
- Climate: Dfb
- Website: www.poytya.fi

Pöytyä (Finnish pronunciation: [ˈpøy̯tyæ]; Swedish: Pöytyä, also Pöytis) is a municipality of Finland located in the Southwest Finland region.

The municipality has a population of 7,903 (31 December 2025) and covers an area of 773.69 square kilometres (298.72 sq mi) of which 23.68 km^{2} (9.14 sq mi) is water. The population density is 10.54 inhabitants per square kilometre (27.3/sq mi). The municipality is unilingually Finnish.

The neighbouring municipality of Karinainen was merged into Pöytyä in the beginning of 2005. The neighbouring municipality of Yläne was merged into Pöytyä in the beginning of 2009.

Pöytyä's neighbouring municipalities are Aura, Eura, Lieto, Loimaa, Marttila, Mynämäki, Oripää and Säkylä.

== Gallery ==
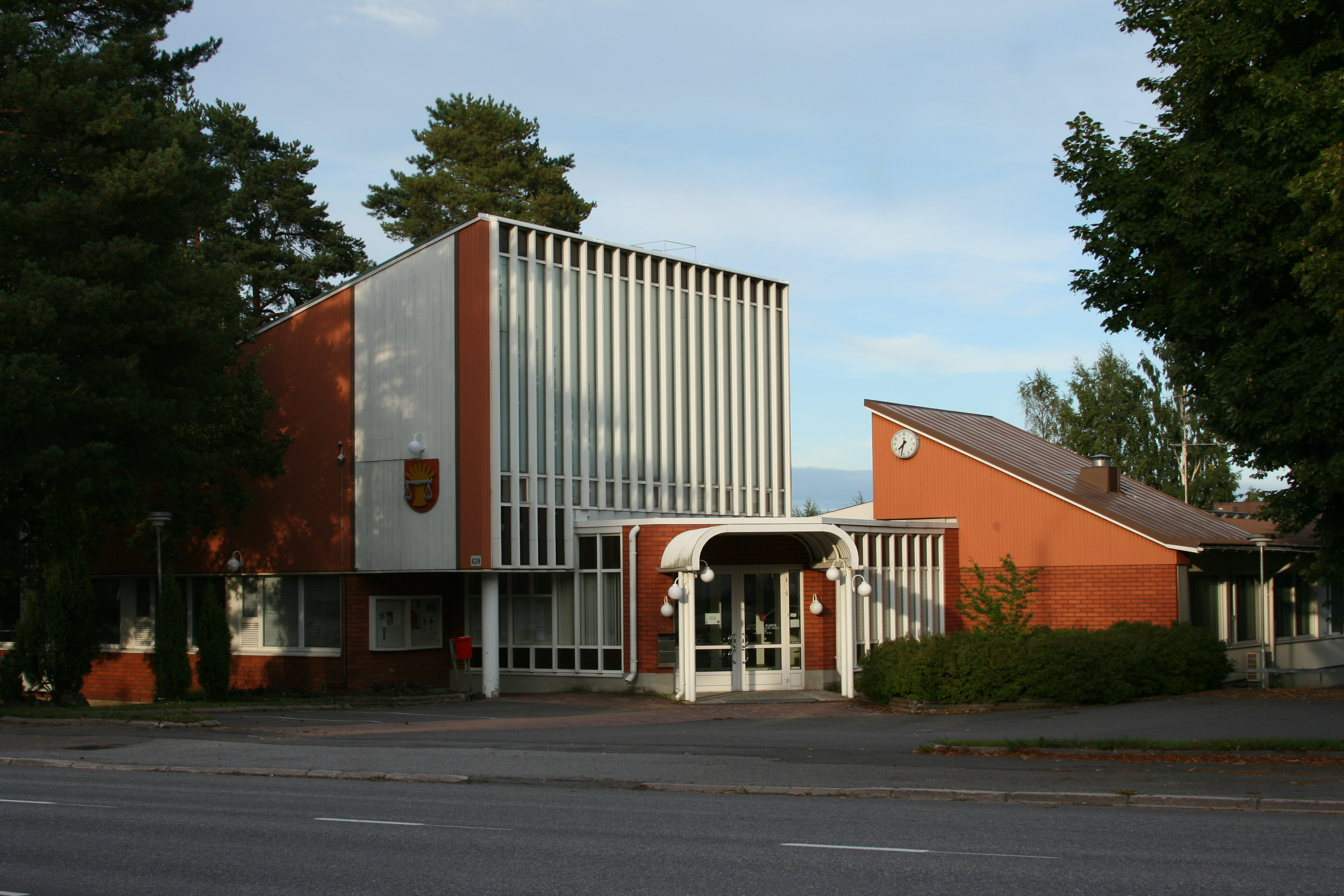
Town Hall

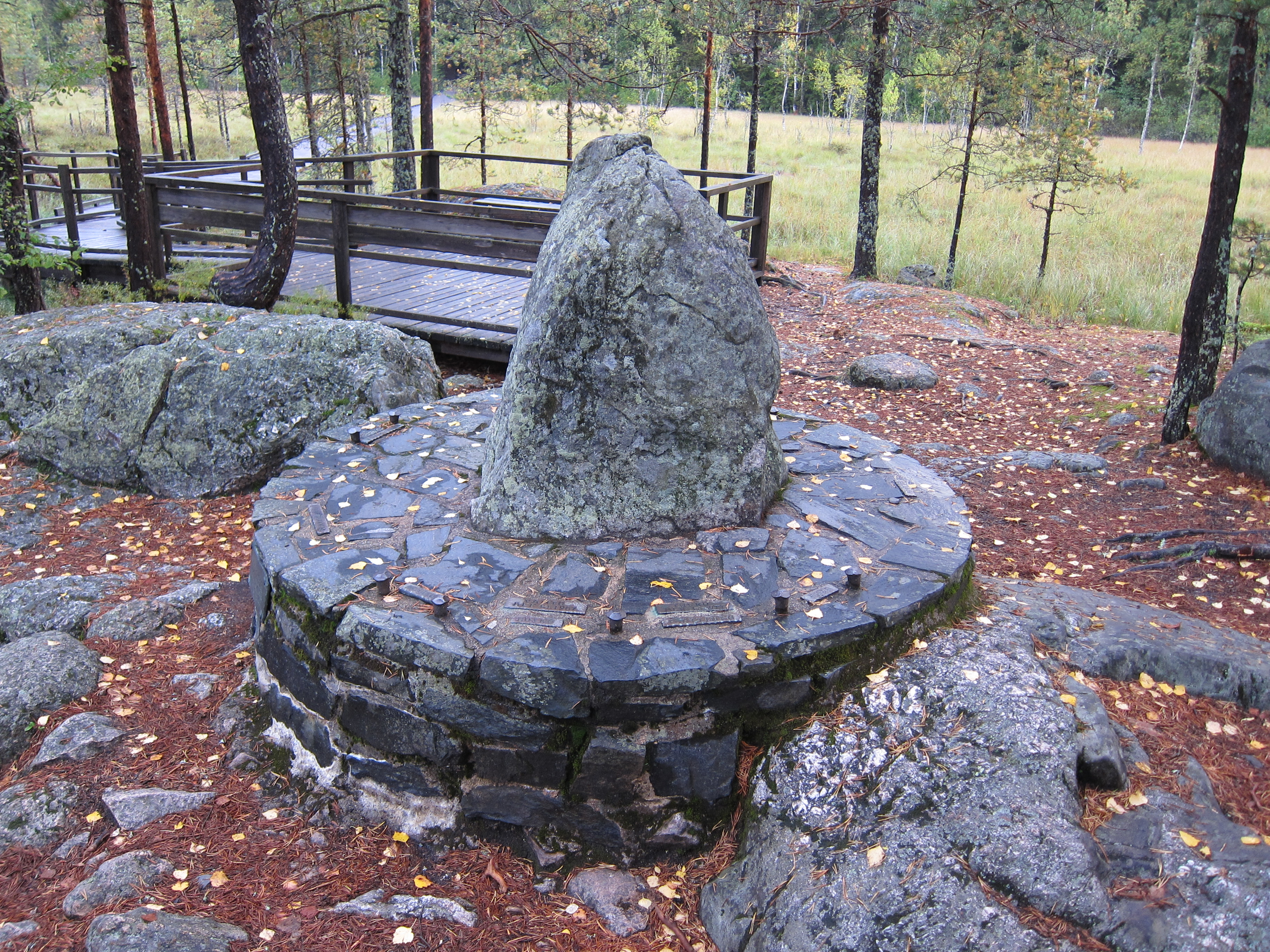
Kuhankuono Boundary stone in Kurjenrahka National Park

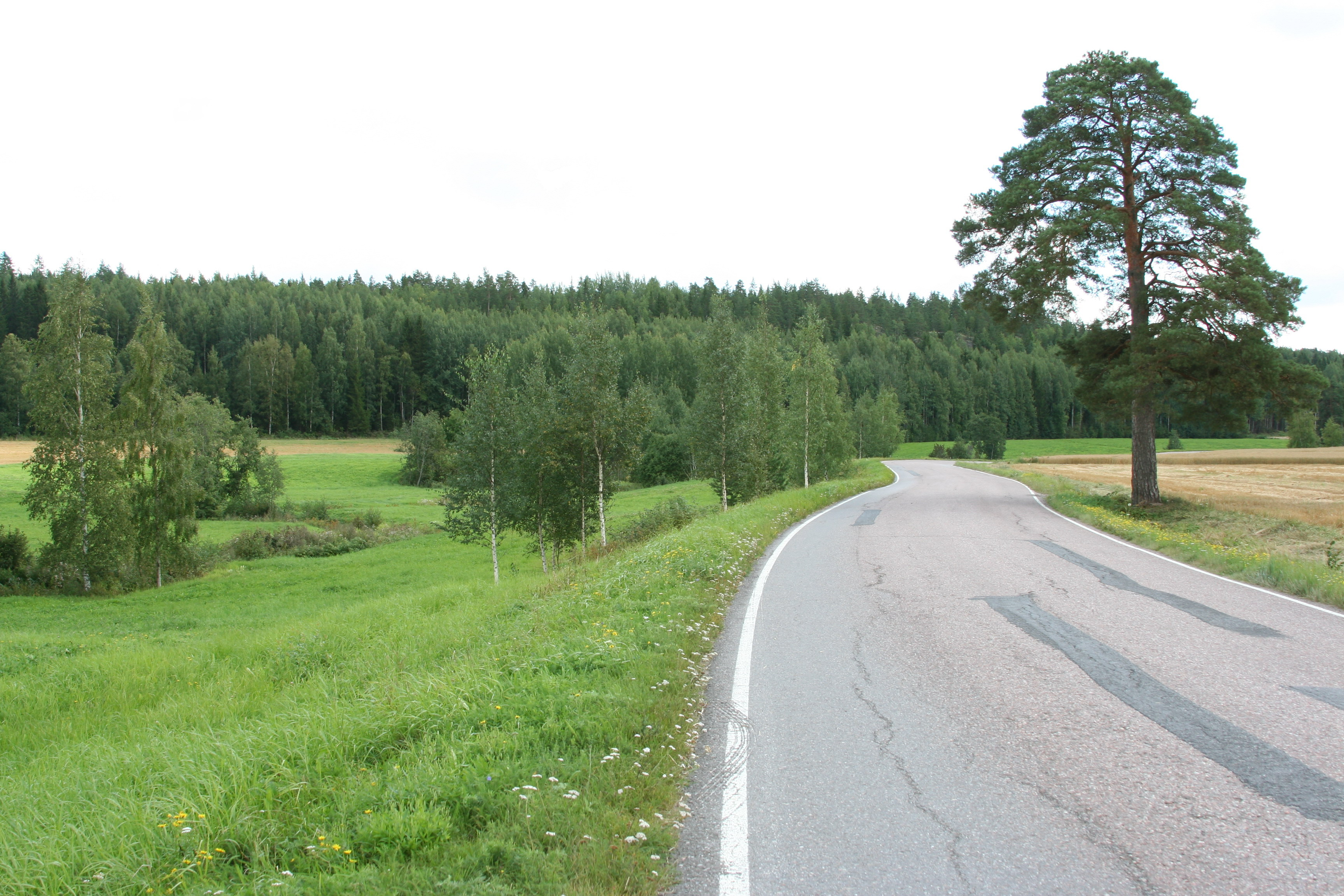
Old main road Turku-Tampere in northern Pöytyä

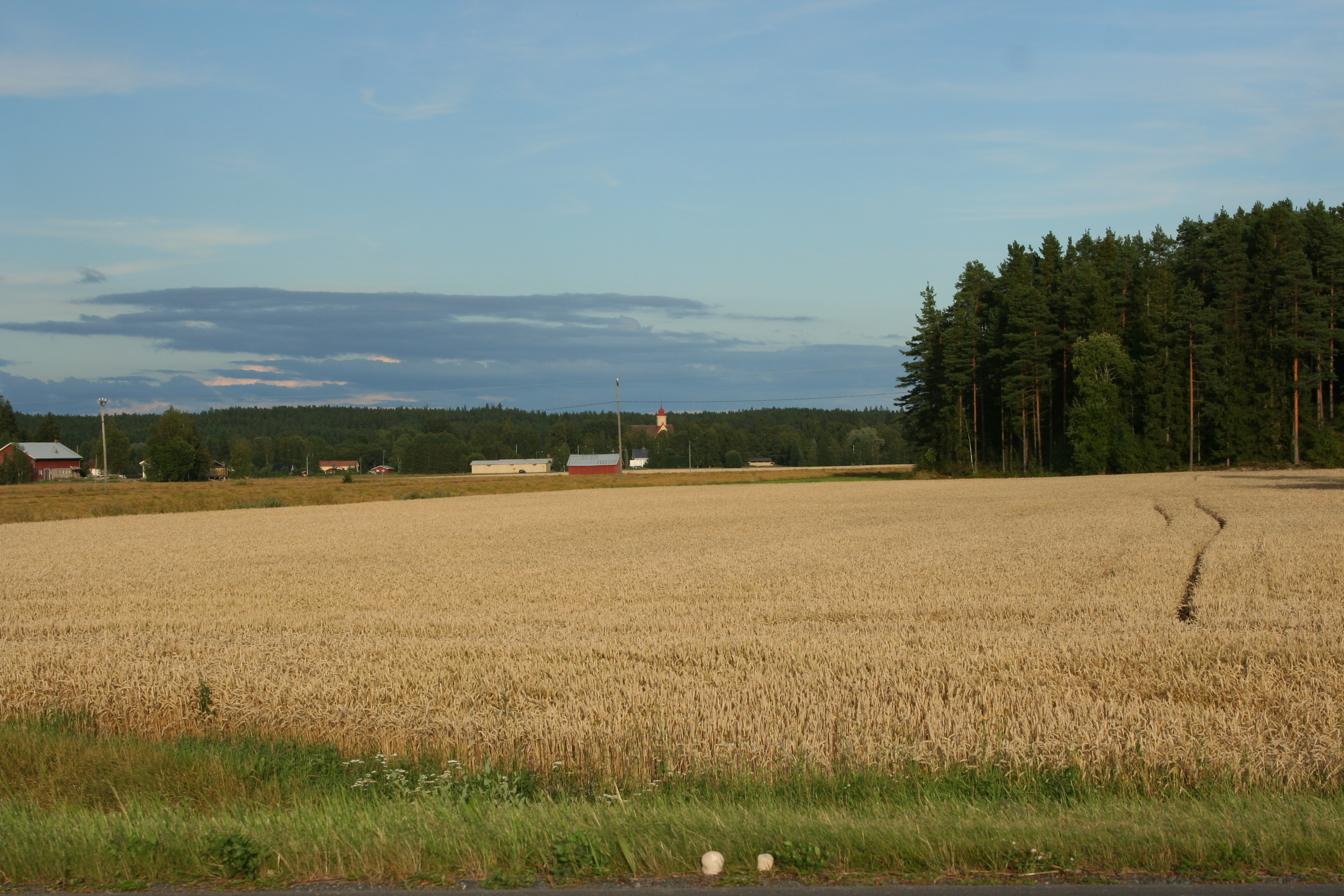
Pöytyä church; photo taken from road 41
