= Lieto =

Lieto Lundo
- Town
- Liedon kaupunki Lundo stad
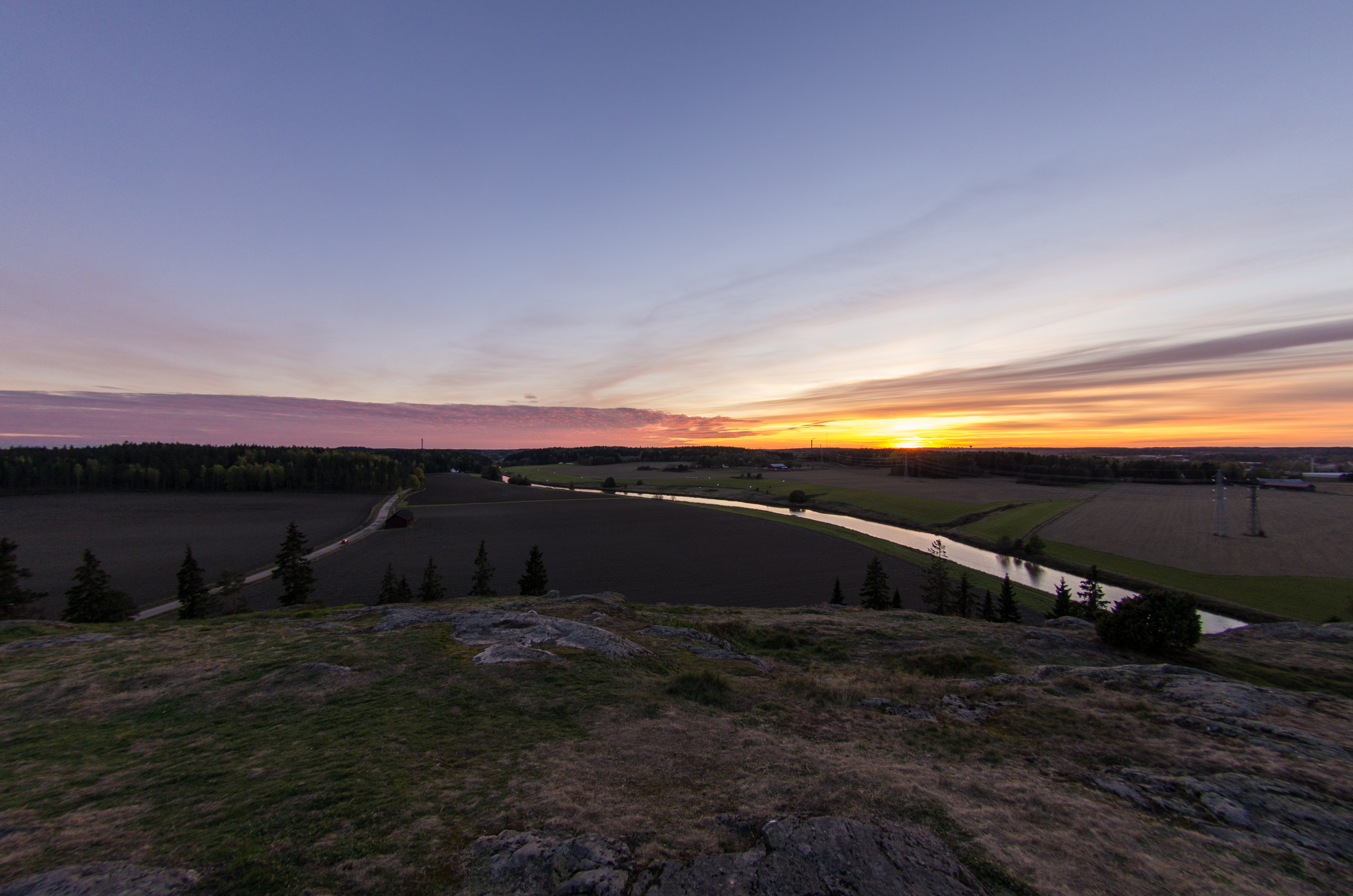

- Coat of arms

- Location of Lieto in Finland
- Interactive map of Lieto
- Coordinates: 60°30.3′N 022°27.5′E
- Country: Finland
- Region: Southwest Finland
- Sub-region: Turku sub-region
- Metropolitan area: Turku metropolitan area
- Founded: 1331

Government
  - Town manager: Mika Ingi

Area (2018-01-01)
  - Total: 302.56 km^{2} (116.82 sq mi)
  - Land: 300.54 km^{2} (116.04 sq mi)
  - Water: 1.66 km^{2} (0.64 sq mi)
  - Rank: 235th largest in Finland

Population (2025-12-31)
  - Total: 20,732
  - Rank: 52nd largest in Finland
  - Density: 68.98/km^{2} (178.7/sq mi)

Population by native language
  - Finnish: 93.8% (official)
  - Swedish: 1.5%
  - Others: 4.7%

Population by age
  - 0 to 14: 19.5%
  - 15 to 64: 60.8%
  - 65 or older: 19.7%
- Time zone: UTC+02:00 (EET)
  - Summer (DST): UTC+03:00 (EEST)
- Climate: Dfb
- Website: lieto.fi

Lieto (Finnish pronunciation: [ˈlie̯to]; Swedish: Lundo) is a town and municipality of Finland.

It is located in the province of Western Finland and is part of the Southwest Finland region. The municipality has a population of 20,732 (31 December 2025) and covers an area of 302.56 square kilometres (116.82 sq mi) of which 1.66 km^{2} (0.64 sq mi) is water. The population density is 68.98 inhabitants per square kilometre (178.7/sq mi).

Neighbour municipalities are Aura, Kaarina, Marttila, Paimio, Pöytyä and Turku.

The town is unilingually Finnish.

Lieto has a medieval stone church, St. Peter's church, that originates from around 1500 near the town center.

The is also home to the largest local scout troop in Finland, called LEK or Liedon Eränkävijät.

Lieto was changed to a town in July 2022.

== Geography ==
Lieto's landscape is dominated by fields, intersected by the Aura River and its largest tributary, the Savijoki. The Aura River features three significant rapids within Lieto: Nautelankoski, Vierunkoski, and Vääntelänkoski. The town's highest point is Hyypiövuori, rising to 90 meters.

In the Tarvasjoki area annexed to Lieto in 2015 flows to the Paimio River and its largest tributary, the Tarvasjoki.

Lieto's only Natura 2000 site, Nautelankoski, is a large rapids area surrounded by various habitat types, such as riverbank groves, rocky meadows, and grasslands.

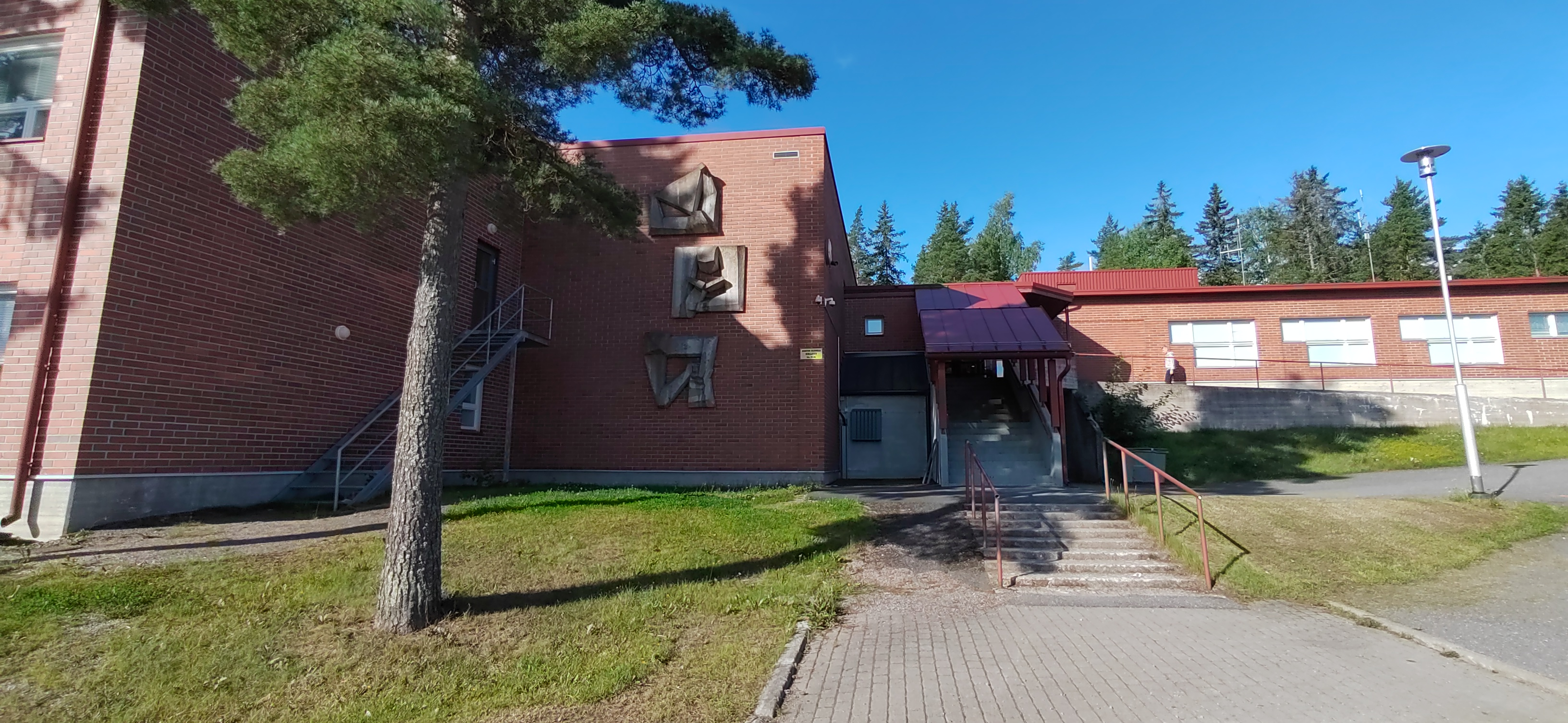
Lieto Upper Secondary School

=== Districts ===
The town of Lieto is divided into seven (7) districts. These cover the entire city area and are used in statistical reporting.

- Asemanseutu
- Ilmarinen
- Kirkonseutu
- Littoinen
- Loukinainen
- Tarvasjoki
- Yliskulma

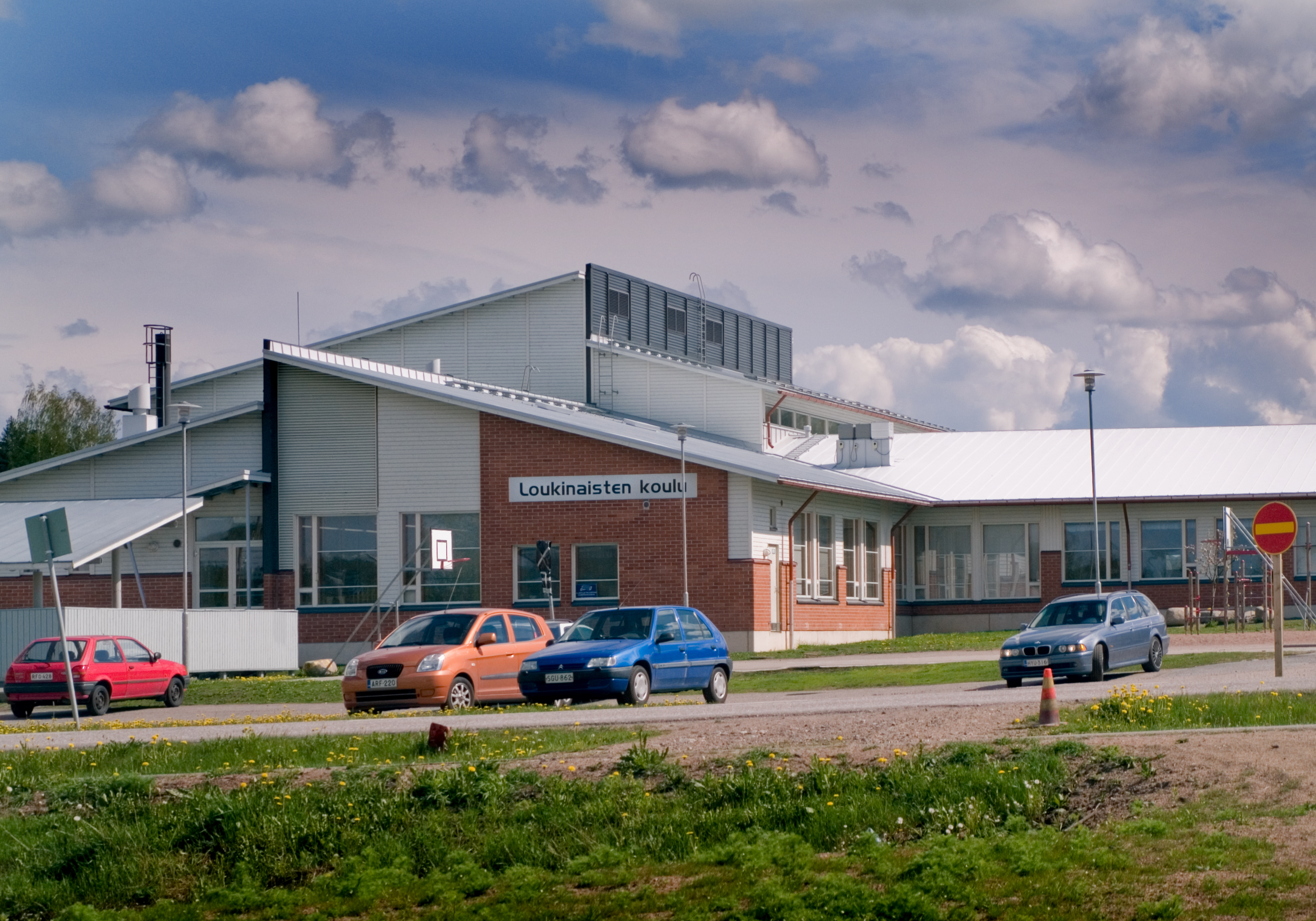
Elementary school in Loukinainen

=== Villages ===
Alhojoki, Ankka, Hakula, Hihnala (Hihna), Hiisi, Huilu, Hyssälä, Hyvättylä, Ilmarinen, Inkoinen, Kahloja, Karvala, Kaskala, Kaurinkoski, Keppola, Ketola, Kilpijoki, Kiusala, Kurkela, Käipilä, Kärpijoki, Laitio, Lintula, Littoinen, Lommola, Loukinainen, Mellilä, Moisio, Mäkkylä, Nautela, Nuolemo, Paappala, Pahka, Pettinen, Pokkola, Pränikkälä, Punittu, Puntamäki, Pyhältö, Raukkala, Rähälä, Saukonoja, Sauvala, Sikilä, Sillilä, Taatila, Tammentaka, Teijula, Tootula, Torstila, Vankio, Vanhalinna, Viikka, Vintala, Vääntelä, Yliskulma

=== Urban Areas ===
At the end of 2020, Lieto had 20,146 inhabitants, of whom 16,906 lived in urban areas, 3,121 in sparsely populated areas, and 119 had an unknown residence. The urbanization rate is 84.4%.

The urban population is divided into six urban areas:

#	Urban Area	Population (31 Dec 2020)
1	**Turku Central Urban Area***	14,319
2	Lieto Railway Area*	1,152
3	Tarvasjoki Church Village	884
4	Jäkärlä*	257
5	Yliskulma	250
6	Paattinen*	44

The town's central urban area is in bold. Asterisks (*) indicate urban areas that only partially lie within the municipality. Lieto's church village, Ilmarinen, and Loukinainen do not form their own urban areas, but are part of the Turku Central Urban Area, which extends into several neighboring municipalities. The Turku Central Urban Area has 272,230 residents and covers an area of 280.82 km². The Jäkärlä and Paattinen urban areas also mainly lie within the city of Turku. The Lieto Railway Area slightly extends into the municipality of Aura.

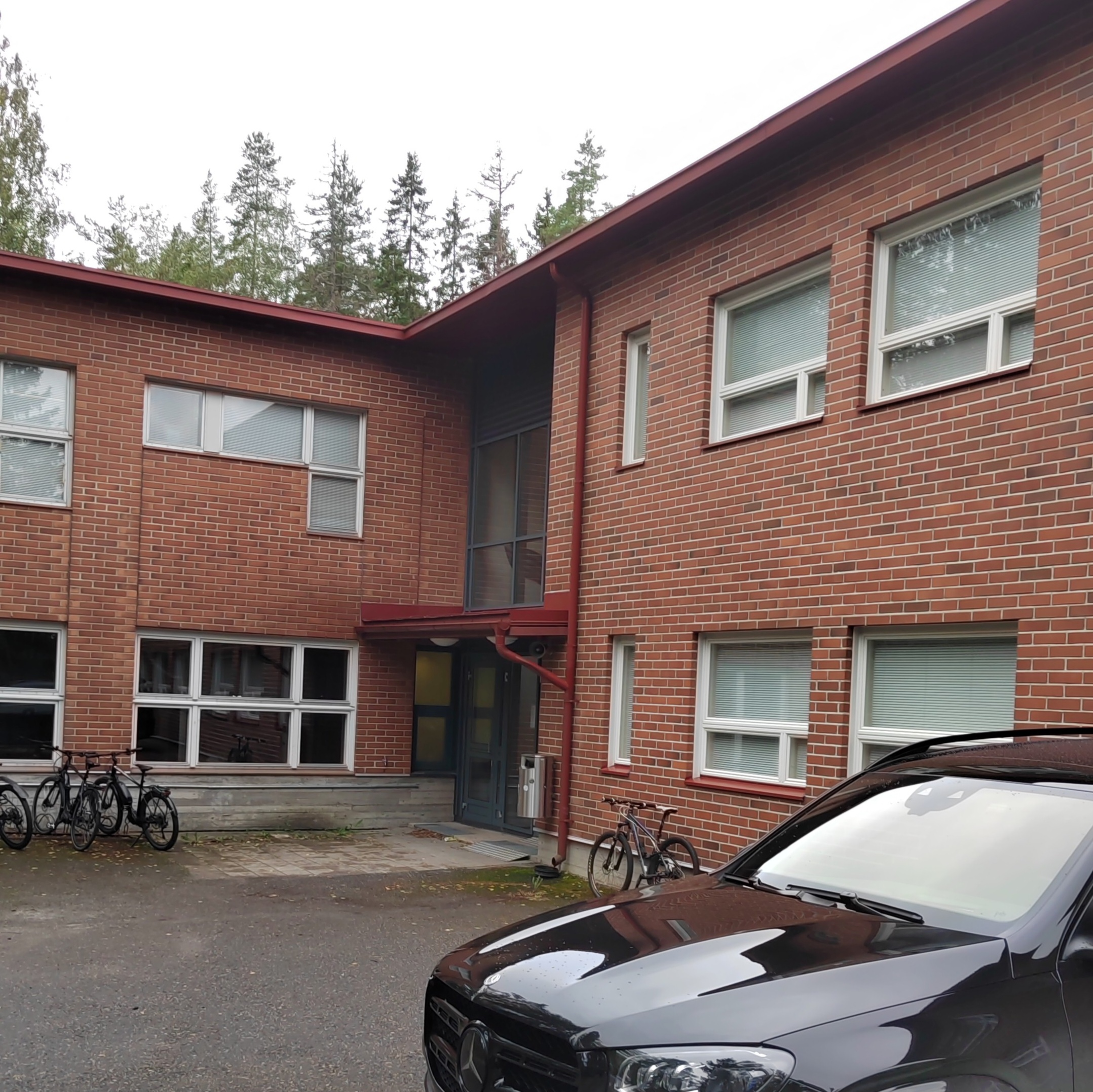
Backyard of Lieto Upper Secondary School

Only the church villages of Lieto and Tarvasjoki have urban area traffic signs.

== History ==
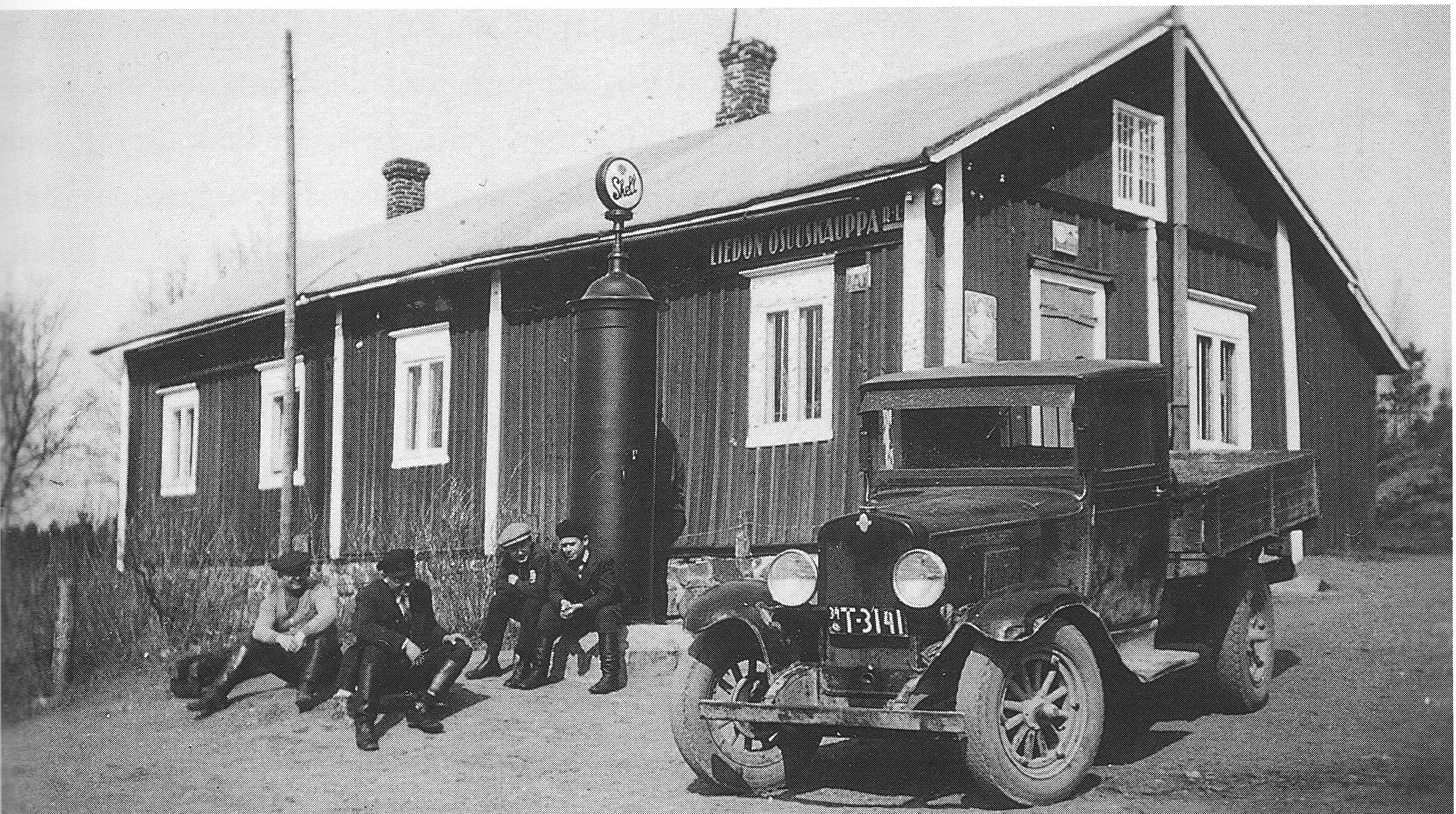
Lieto Cooperative Store in 1934

Map of the municipal mergers of Lieto and Aura. The main part of Aura was previously part of the Prunkkala chapel parish under Lieto. Tarvasjoki municipality was merged with Lieto in 2015.

Archaeological findings in Lieto indicate that the area has been inhabited since the Stone and Bronze Ages. Vanhalinna of Lieto is one of Finland's ancient hillforts. Numerous Iron Age and medieval artifacts have been discovered in the hillfort area of Vanhalinna.

A document from 1331 survives in which Lieto's parish priest, Pietari, is mentioned for the first time. As a result, the founding year of the Lieto parish and church is considered to be 1331.

In June 2014, the Government of Finland decided, under the 2013 municipal structure law, to merge Tarvasjoki with Lieto. The merger came into effect on 1 January 2015.

In May 2022, the municipal council of Lieto decided to adopt the status of a town. The proposal was made by municipal manager Mika Ingi, who argued that town status could improve Lieto's position within the new wellbeing services county.

== Economy ==
In 2016, the largest corporate income tax payers in Lieto were Liedon Säästöpankki (Lieto Savings Bank), I.S. Mäkinen Oy, a company specializing in cruise ship interiors, and Carrus Delta, a manufacturer of bus bodies.

== Notable residents ==
- Liisa Hyssälä (b. 1948), Member of Parliament (Centre Party), Doctor of Dentistry
- Marjukka Parpola (b. 1967), Member of Parliament (National Coalition Party), CEO
- Anne-Mari Virolainen (b. 1965), Member of Parliament (National Coalition Party)
