= Dalsbruk =

Village in Finland

Coordinates: 60°01′16″N 22°30′25″E

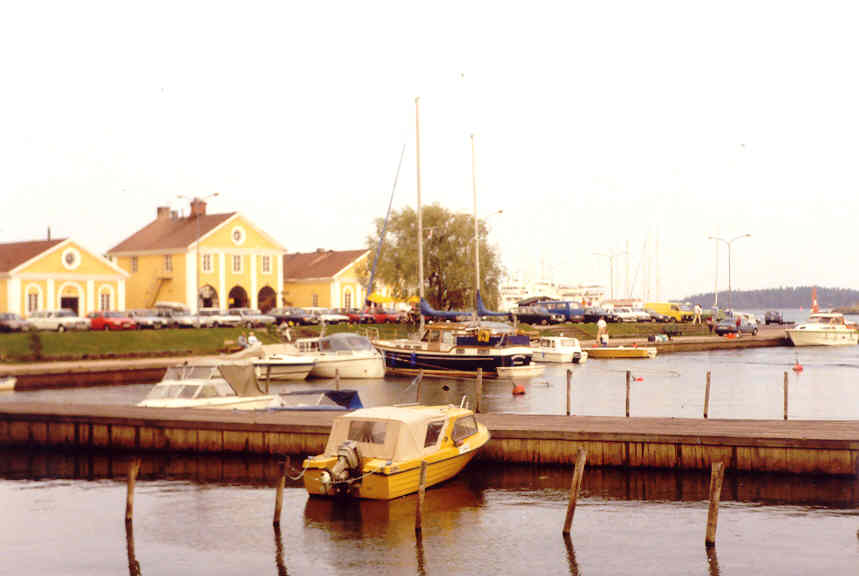
Dalsbruk, town center, summer 1992.

Dalsbruk (Finnish: Taalintehdas) is a small town with about 1000 inhabitants in the municipality of Kemiönsaari in Southwest Finland. Until 2009, Dalsbruk was the central settlement of the former municipality of Dragsfjärd, when the municipalities of Kemiö, Västanfjärd, and Dragsfjärd merged to form Kemiönsaari.

The development of the village of Dalsbruk has been primarily influenced by industrialization and the more than 300-year history of the Dalsbruk ironworks. The ironworks were founded in 1686, and the iron factory operated there until 2012. The village itself is considered to have emerged when the ironworks were established in the village of Dahls.

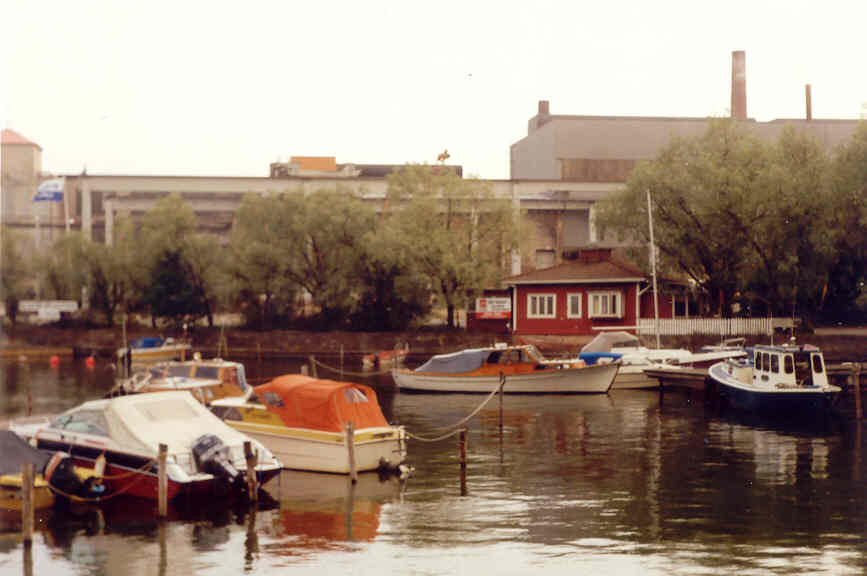
Dalsbruk Oy

Every July, Dalsbruk hosts the Baltic Jazz festival, and in August, the multi-arts Norpas Festival takes place. In June, the Lövö broloppet half marathon runs from Dalsbruk over the Lövö bridge to Kasnäs.

The Finnish National Board of Antiquities (Museovirasto) has designated the historical industrial area of Dalsbruk as a nationally significant built cultural environment. A distinctive feature of the town is that many of its buildings are constructed entirely or partially from slag bricks, which are made from the by-products of iron production. The oldest residential buildings in Dals Bruk date back to the 18th century. In 2015, the Trade Union of Education (OAJ) awarded Taalintehdas School as School of the Year.

== History of the Dalsbruk Factory ==
Dalsbruk Factory was founded in 1686 in the village of Dahl by the Swede Daniel Faxell. At the time, the village belonged to the Crown and was home to only a few peasant families.

Over the centuries, the Dalsbruk factory played an important role as an employer, though its impact varied greatly from one era to another. In 2012, the factory went bankrupt and closed down.

== Historic Buildings ==
For much of the 20th century, industrial companies took care of community planning in their surrounding areas, including the construction of housing and recreational facilities. The factory owned most of the local land for a long time and was responsible for both zoning and building. After the Second World War, the factory’s influence over community development gradually declined. In the 1970s, the municipal center was moved to Dalsbruk, and the municipality became the main authority for planning and construction.

Dalsbruk’s building heritage consists of industrial, production, and warehouse buildings from different eras, as well as workers’ housing and residential areas that span from the 18th century to today. The village’s well-preserved and cohesive built environment offers a fascinating look into the evolution of the ironworks community. The character of the village is further enlivened by the traditional nicknames still used for many buildings—names that reflect the nature of the houses and the humor of the locals.

=== Industrial Buildings ===
The relocation of Dalsbruk’s factory operations to its own island separated the plant from the rest of the village structure. In contrast, the oldest factory buildings have blended into the traditional village environment. The industrial buildings form two distinct clusters. Below the old stone dam—built of natural stone, later partially rebuilt and reinforced—lie the ruins of the grey-stone and brick blast furnace and, around it, the foundations of the roasting house, the sintering furnace, and the charcoal room. The first blast furnace was built in 1688. This area remained the center of industrial activity until the late 19th century, after which the industrial hub shifted to Skeppsholmen. The existing blast-furnace ruin dates from the 19th century and remained in use until 1928. South of the furnace are buildings made of slag-brick and red brick: the foundry, the brick machine shop, and the screw- and bolt factory.

Dalsbruk’s blast furnace is one of the oldest blast-furnace ironworks in Finland. Today, the ruins host events such as concerts during the Baltic Jazz and Norpas festivals. In the summer of 2013, the ruins served as a venue for summer theatre performances. The stone buildings surrounding the furnace ruins include an 18th-century pig-iron foundry and a mechanical workshop.The workshop is used annually for atmospheric Christmas markets, concerts, and other events. Its use is limited by poor lighting and cold conditions: the building has a dirt floor and no heating. One of the buildings also houses a laundry.

The newer factory area—whose oldest parts date from the 1920s and which expanded especially in the 1930s and 1970s—was established on the island of Skeppsholmen. Skeppsholmen is connected to the mainland by an embankment. The island became the new industrial center of Dalsbruk when a puddling plant was built there. Several dwellings, warehouses, and a water supply system were also constructed on the island. Originally, Skeppsholmen served as a loading port for cargo ships. In the 19th century, the island took on a new character with the establishment of a rolling mill, puddling furnaces, and later steam-powered bar-iron hammers. By the 20th century, all industrial operations had moved to the island. Most of its building stock has been repeatedly renewed as industry developed, though several brick buildings from the 1920s still remain.Today, parts of the newer industrial area are used for boat storage. The factory’s oldest brick section is now squeezed between more recent industrial halls.

Along the shore stand the charcoal kilns, which are unique: Dalsbruk’s set of eleven charcoal ovens is the largest such complex in all of Europe. The ovens were built beginning in the 1830s to produce the charcoal needed to fuel the blast furnace. They are constructed from slag stone.There were once more ovens on the site, but some were demolished in the early 1970s to make room for the new municipal office building.

=== The Market Square and the Waterfront Storehouses ===
The market square and the buildings around it took shape in the mid-1800s. The first structures in the area were likely the waterfront storehouses, which included a stable, a grain store, and a general storage building. Nearby stood an office building and the old post house on the edge of the square. All of these buildings were designed in the Empire style.

The waterfront storehouses are traditionally called the “Engel Storehouses,” although there’s no evidence that Carl Ludvig Engel actually designed them. Originally, the complex also included a loading pier and a crane. For many years, the storehouses housed the ironworks’ office facilities. Today, they host a restaurant and, in summer, the tourist information center. The old stable now serves as a cinema and also hosts various public events. Its history is acknowledged in its name: Bio Pony.

Key public services grew up around the square—first the post and telegraph, and later, in the 1900s, a bakery and a slaughterhouse. Several well-preserved mid-19th-century buildings still stand around the square: the old post house with its three porches, the office building behind it, and the residential building known as “Kivikakola” on the hill.

A market has been held in Dalsbruk since at least the 1880s. Today, essential services are still clustered around the square, including shops, a hair salon, and a local postal agent. Market days remain Wednesday and Saturday, and the square hosts several public events and evening markets each year.

=== The Manor Houses and Ironworks ===
Dalsbruk has two ironworks manors. The older one, built in 1762, sits on a slope leading down toward the water, surrounded by its park. Nearby stands the old office building, which once housed factory officials and likely dates back to the late 1700s or early 1800s. There’s also an Empire-style staff building from the mid-19th century.

The first manor was commissioned in 1762 by the Petersen family, the early owners of the ironworks. It originally reflected the typical manor architecture of the 18th century. Even though it has been expanded and renovated many times over the years, the main building has kept its essential shape and character. Up until recent decades, the manor served as the ironworks’ primary reception and representative space.

A new manor was added in the 1870s, designed by Swiss architect A. Brünner. This newer building was ornate and featured a tall tower visible from far away. Other buildings from that same period included the doctor’s villa, a club house, and a hotel that served both official functions and community gatherings. Of these, only the club house has preserved its original style. The Stünzi manor underwent major renovations in 1935–36 under architect Gunnar Wahlroos, replacing its decorative Swiss look with a stricter, almost modern form of classicism. On the Lahti side of the area, several more 19th-century buildings remain, including the current hotel, which originally held apartments for factory staff.

The ironworks manor was surrounded by a large orchard as early as the 1700s, forming the beginnings of what would become the ironworks park. The park’s character changed dramatically in the 1870s and 1880s, when Jacob Stünzi, a Swiss-born industrialist, built a new decorative, carpenter-style manor on a hill on the opposite side of the park, along with several other buildings in the same style.

=== Church, School, and Saunas ===
Many of the buildings in Dalsbruk were constructed using slag stone, and these structures are an important part of the village’s overall character. For a long time, the community hoped to have its own church. In 1934, the ironworks purchased the slag-brick church originally built by the Methodist congregation in 1921–1922, and handed it over to the local parish on the condition that the parish would take responsibility for paying the priest’s salary.

Dalsbruk’s primary school was built in 1908 and has been expanded several times since. The Jugend-style school building features a tall slag-stone foundation, asymmetrically placed windows, and varied windowpanes, all contributing to its distinctive façade. Today, the building houses the Swedish-language school Dalsbruks Skola. The separate Taalintehdas School (formerly the Finnish-language elementary school) was built in 1957.

In the northern part of the Ironworks Park stands a sauna built from slag stone in 1902. It was originally reserved for upper-level officials. Another sauna, meant for the workers, stands by a small pond called Dammen. After regular sauna use ended, that building served as a residential house right up until recent years.

=== Workers’ Housing ===
The workers’ and officials’ residential buildings in Dalsbruk form an unusually well-preserved, historically layered whole that spans from the 1700s to the present day. The first workers’ houses were likely built at the turn of the 18th century on the southern slope of Norrbacken. These were small cottages intended for one, two, or three families. The remaining Norrbacken workers’ houses are typical of the early 1800s. Originally, they were probably much more modest in appearance and were later painted with traditional red ochre. Today, the Norrbacken cottages are part of the Dalsbruk Ironworks Museum, furnished to show workers’ homes from different eras.

As the ironworks expanded in the late 1800s and more labor was needed, demand for housing grew. This led to the construction of barrack-style buildings. The so-called Slaggis and Marmoripalatsi (“Marble Palace”) were the first two-storey barracks built in Dalsbruk at the end of the 19th century. Both were constructed from slag stone in a classical style. Later barracks differed from these earlier ones.

Another distinctive local housing type is the two-storey gallery-corridor houses built in the late 19th and early 20th centuries. Nedre Kajlins (or Nedre Kahelin) dates from 1900, and Nybyggningen from 1890. Around Nybyggningen there are several earth cellars used as cold storage spaces for the barracks’ residents. Käringslängtan (“Akan Kaipuu”) and Slottet (“The Castle”), one of the grandest gallery-corridor barracks, were built in 1896. Slottet once housed apartments for 28 families.

As the settlement filled up in the east, construction continued westward in the 1890s toward Sabbels Hill. Sabbels received two clusters of large gallery-corridor barracks, the newer of which still survive. These barracks resemble the newer buildings in the eastern residential area, but with more pronounced national-romantic features. The window frames, chimneys, and decorative stone foundations reflect turn-of-the-century style. The buildings were designed so that their tall, closed façades face the sea, while the more intimate side—with decorative entrances and galleries—faces the sheltered courtyard. Today, the barracks serve as residential buildings, and the gallery-corridor houses are mainly used as summer homes.

By the early 1900s, settlement had spread both east and west, leaving northward expansion as the only option. The light-colored buildings at the Tullimäentie crossroads already stood there in the 1870s. The customs post and surrounding buildings were likely established around the same time as the market square. The light-colored barracks building known as Koirankoppi (“The Doghouse”), located on the slope, was built in 1902. Its steeply pitched dormers are typical of early 20th-century architecture. Well into the 1900s, more than 60% of workers’ homes consisted of just one room, and a third were made up of a single room plus a kitchen. Overcrowding was a major issue, easing only in the 1920s as two-room apartments became more common. Housing shortages remained typical. Wooden barracks continued to be built into the 1920s, after which construction shifted back to multi-family houses.

Next to Slottet is a cluster of small houses called Honolulu because it forms its own small “island group.” These homes were built in the 1920s and 1930s, when single-family houses became a new and popular form of working-class housing. They follow the typical small-house style of the time: square plans built around a central chimney, steep gabled roofs, and classical details such as white corner boards and lunette windows. The houses stand on slag-stone foundations. The light, modest appearance of these “Hollywood houses” contrasts sharply with the bold colors and ornate shapes of the Sabbels barracks.

More recent housing is represented by the four prefabricated apartment buildings of Klockberga and Trollberga, built on the west side of Lähetinvuori in the early 1970s. These modern flats offered a new level of comfort and were highly sought after.
