= Hitis =

Archipelago in southwest Finland

Hitis Hitis – Hiittinen
- Former Municipality
- Hitis kommun Hiittisten kunta
- Coat of arms

- Interactive map of Hitis
- Location within Southwest Finland Location within Finland Location within Europe
- Country: Finland
- Region: Southwest Finland
- Established: 1861
- Merged: 1969

Area
  - Urban: 109.8 km^{2} (42.4 sq mi)

Population (1963)
  - Urban: 811
  - Urban density: 7.38/km^{2} (19.1/sq mi)
- Time zone: UTC+02:00 (EET)
  - Summer (DST): UTC+03:00 (EEST)

Hitis (Finnish: Hiittinen) is a small archipelago and a former municipality in Finland. It lies south from Kimitoön in the province of Southwest Finland.

The main islands of Hitis are Rosala and Hitis. They are connected to the mainland by a ferry. In total there are more than 2000 islands and islets in Hitis, and some of them are inhabited permanently. There are many summer cottages in Hitis.

Hitis was a trade harbour during the Viking era. Administratively it was part of Kimito until the municipality was established in 1861. During World War II, the battles of Bengtskär and Morgonlandet took place within Hitis. The municipality was merged to Dragsfjärd in 1969.

== Villages ==
Bergö, Biskopsö, Bolax, Böle, Hitis, Holma, Högsåra, Kaxskäla, Kasnäs, Rosala, Stubbnäs, Tunhamn, Vänoxa, Vänö
