= Högsåra =

Village in the former municipality of Dragsfjärd, Finland

Coordinates: 59°57′N 22°22′E

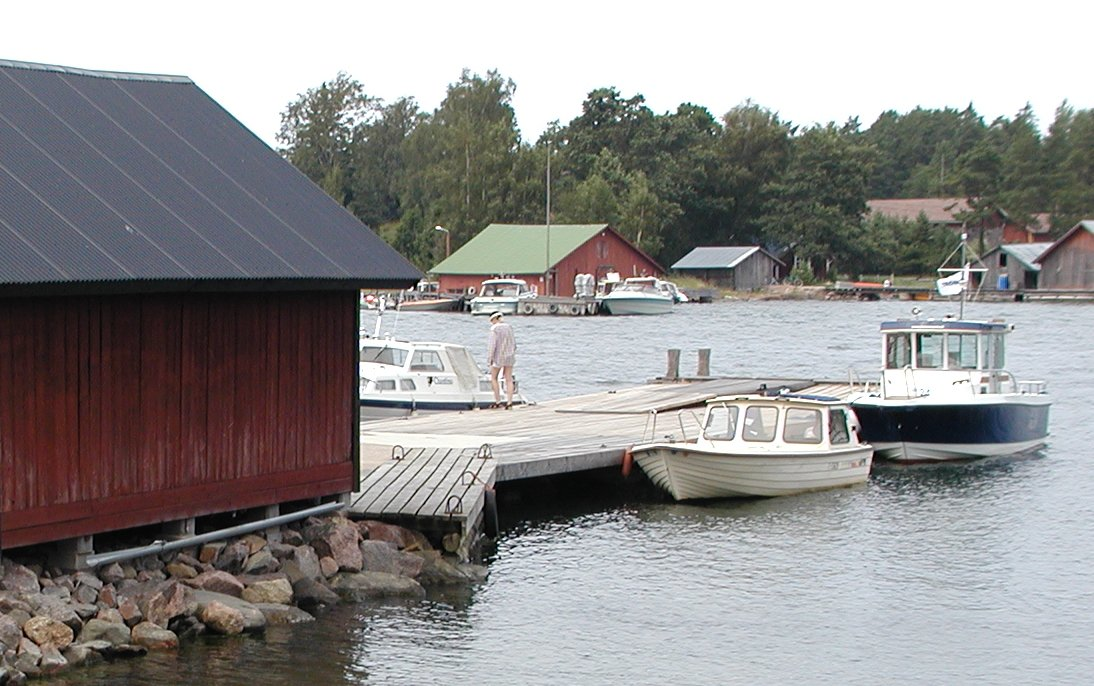
Högsåra in 2002.

Högsåra is a village in the former municipality of Dragsfjärd in the archipelago of Hitis, Finland, situated on an island by the same name, with a regular ferry connection to the mainland. The village was known as a station of pilots before. Today it is a popular holiday destination during the summer months. The village has a population of about 50.

Högsåra has three wind power producers. They were opened on 15 June 2008.

Part of the island belongs to the Archipelago National Park.

Emperor Alexander III, Grand Duke of Finland, regularly visited Högsåra with his family during the summers 1885–1894.

== Gallery ==
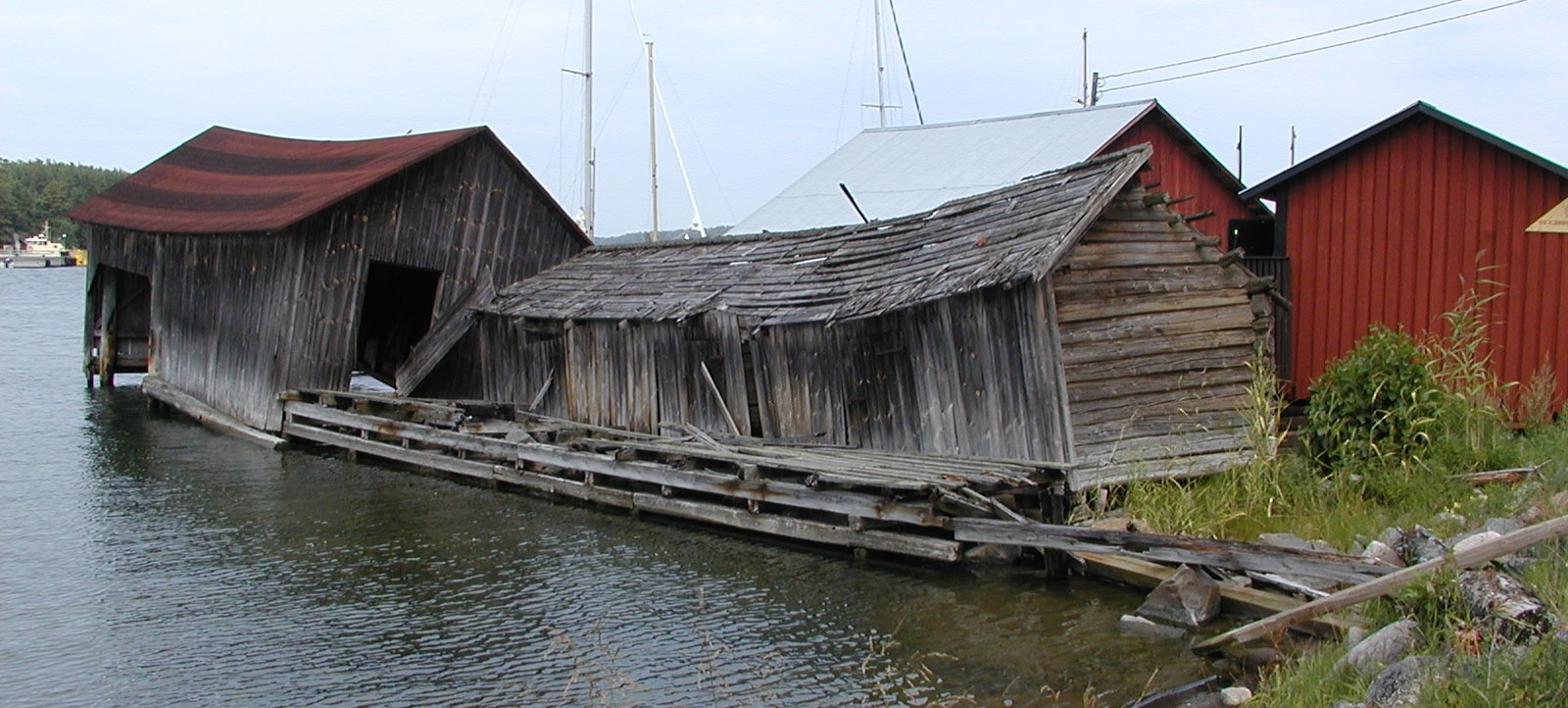

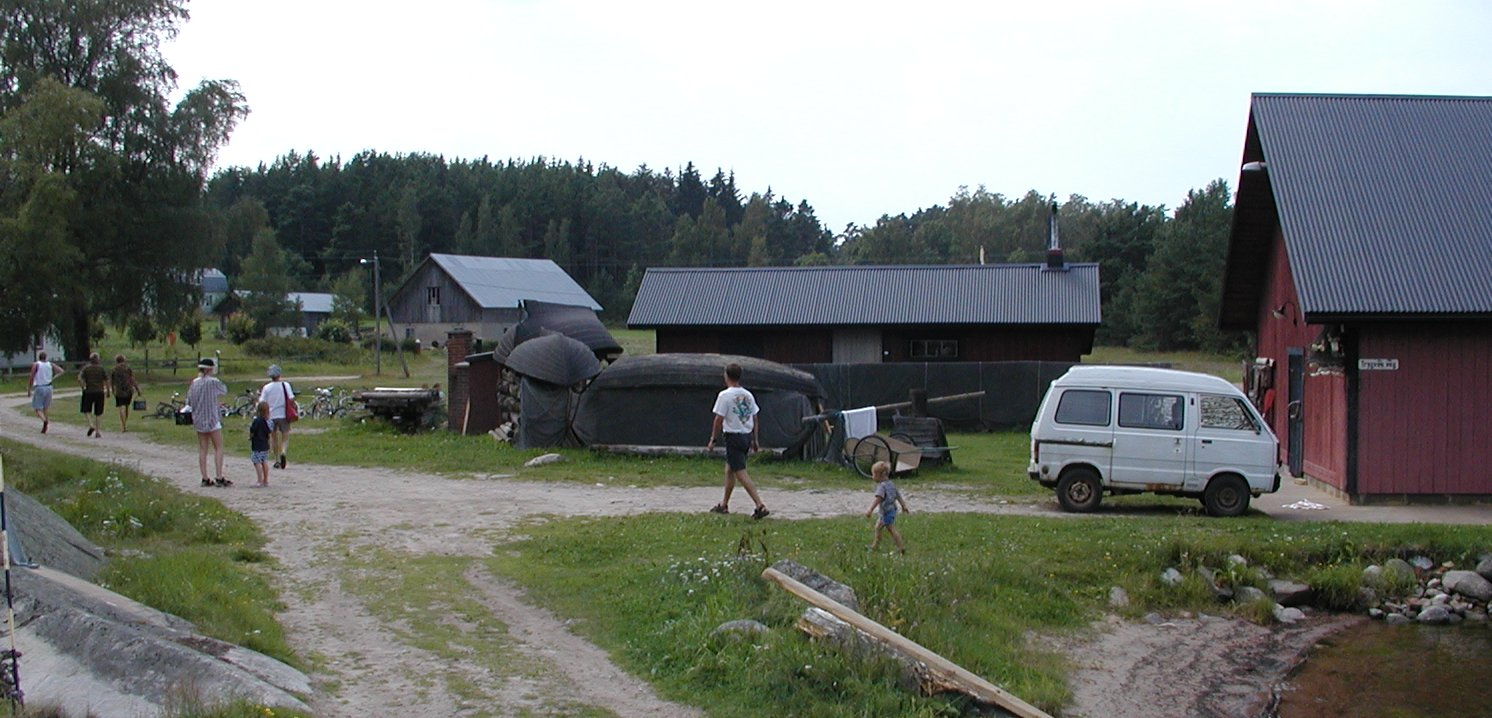

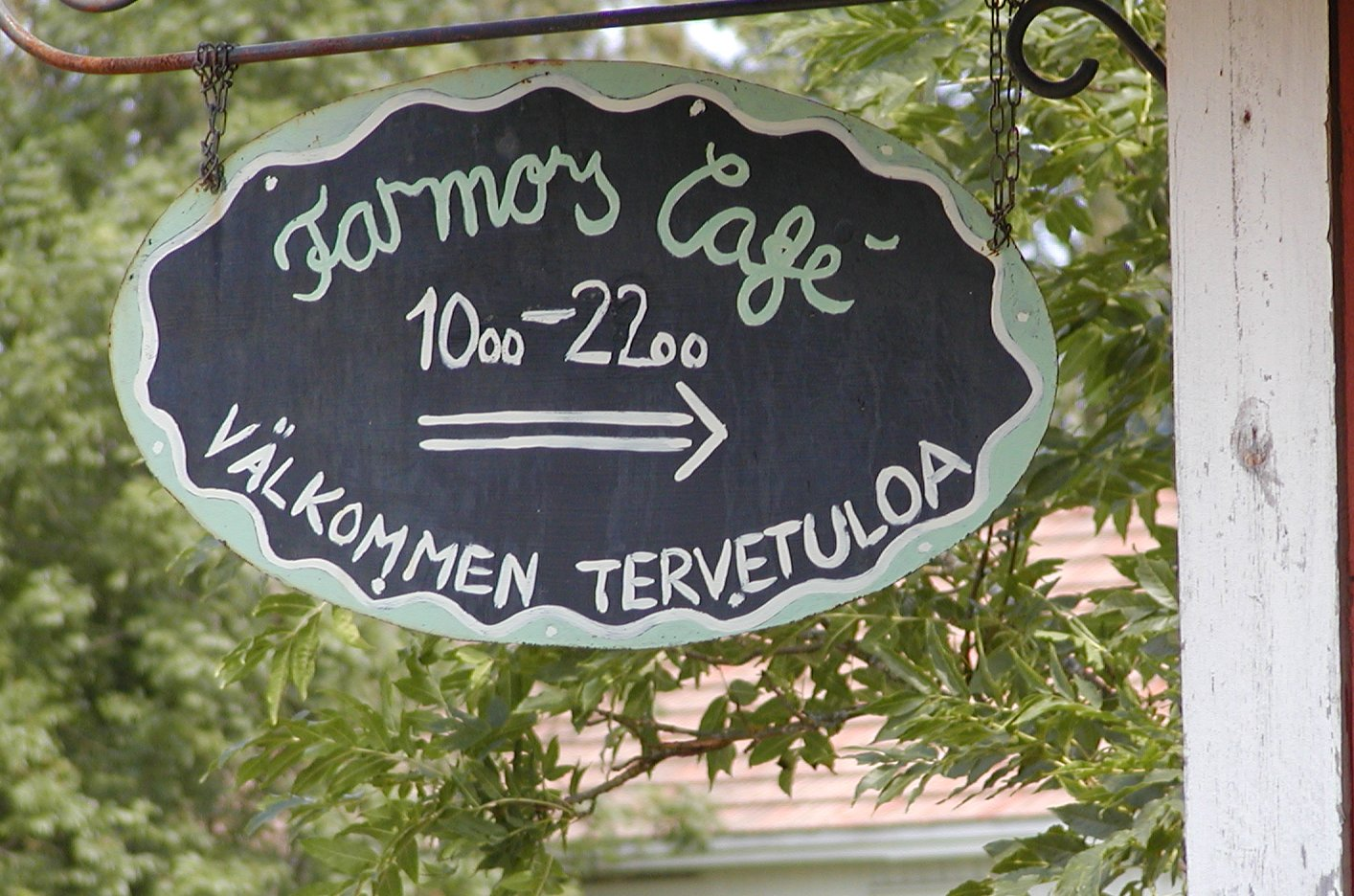

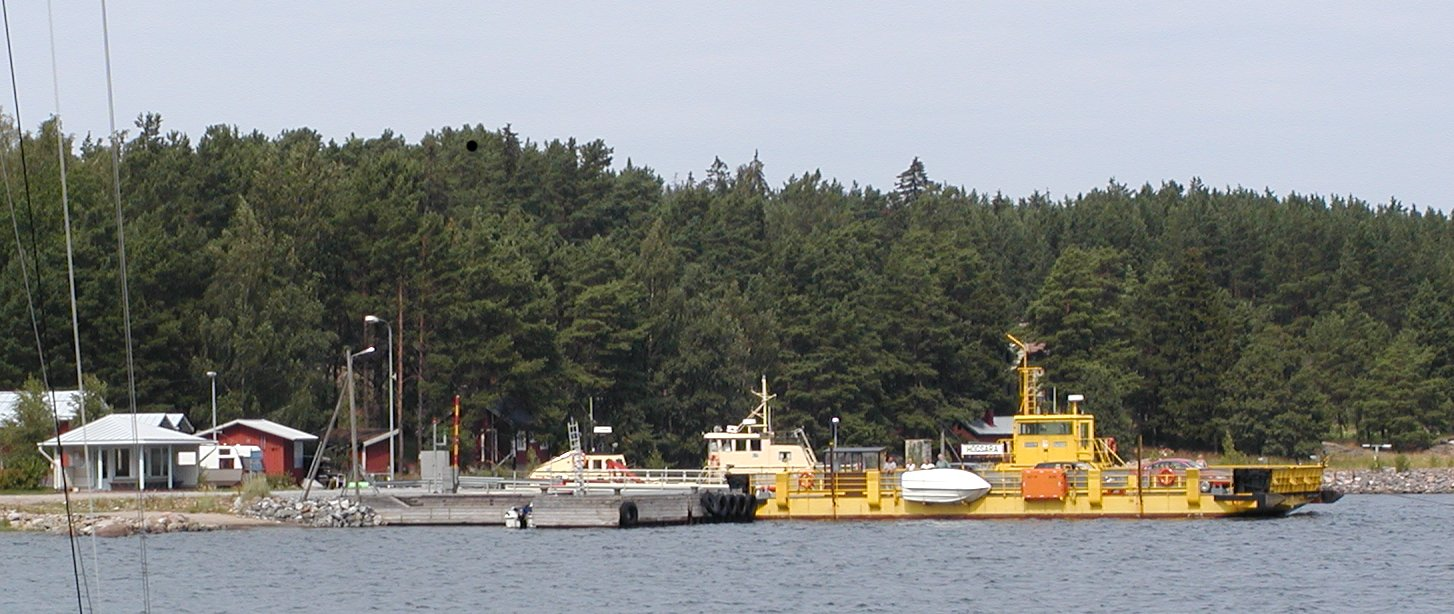
