= Örö =

Island in the Archipelago Sea, Finland

Coordinates: 59.8117°N 22.3233°E

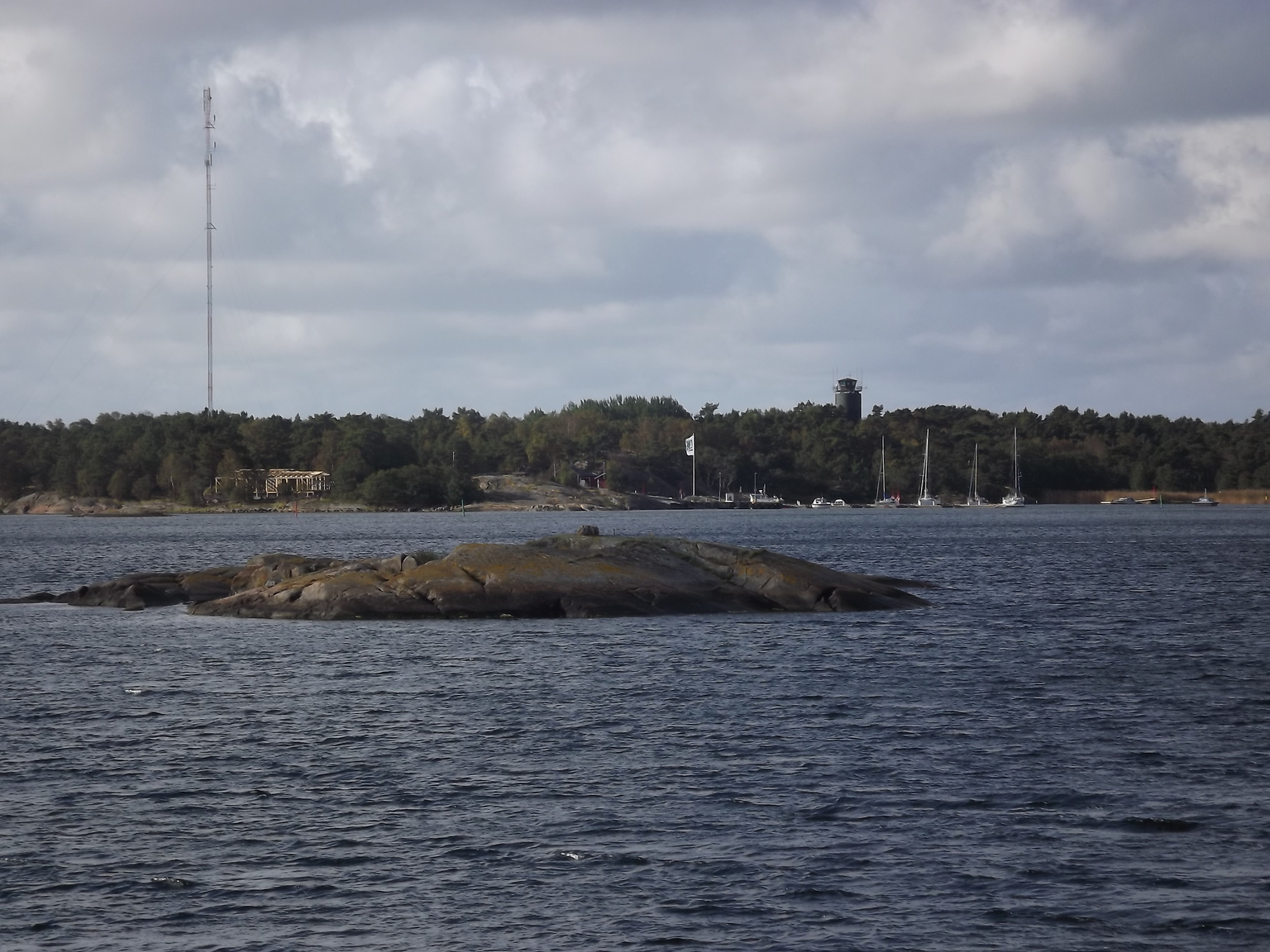
The harbour entrance

Örö is a large island in the Archipelago Sea in Finland. It is part of the municipality of Kimitoön. The island remained a military area until 2015, when it became part of the Archipelago National Park and became available to tourists. More can be found about its military service on the Fortifications of Oro page.
