= SS Helsingfors =

A number of ships have been named Helsingfors, including

- SS Helsingfors (1901), 131 GRT, later named Ustamo and Von Konow.
- SS Helsingfors (1903), 759 GRT, wrecked in 1905
