= Fortifications of Örö =

Finnish fortifications in the Gulf of Finland

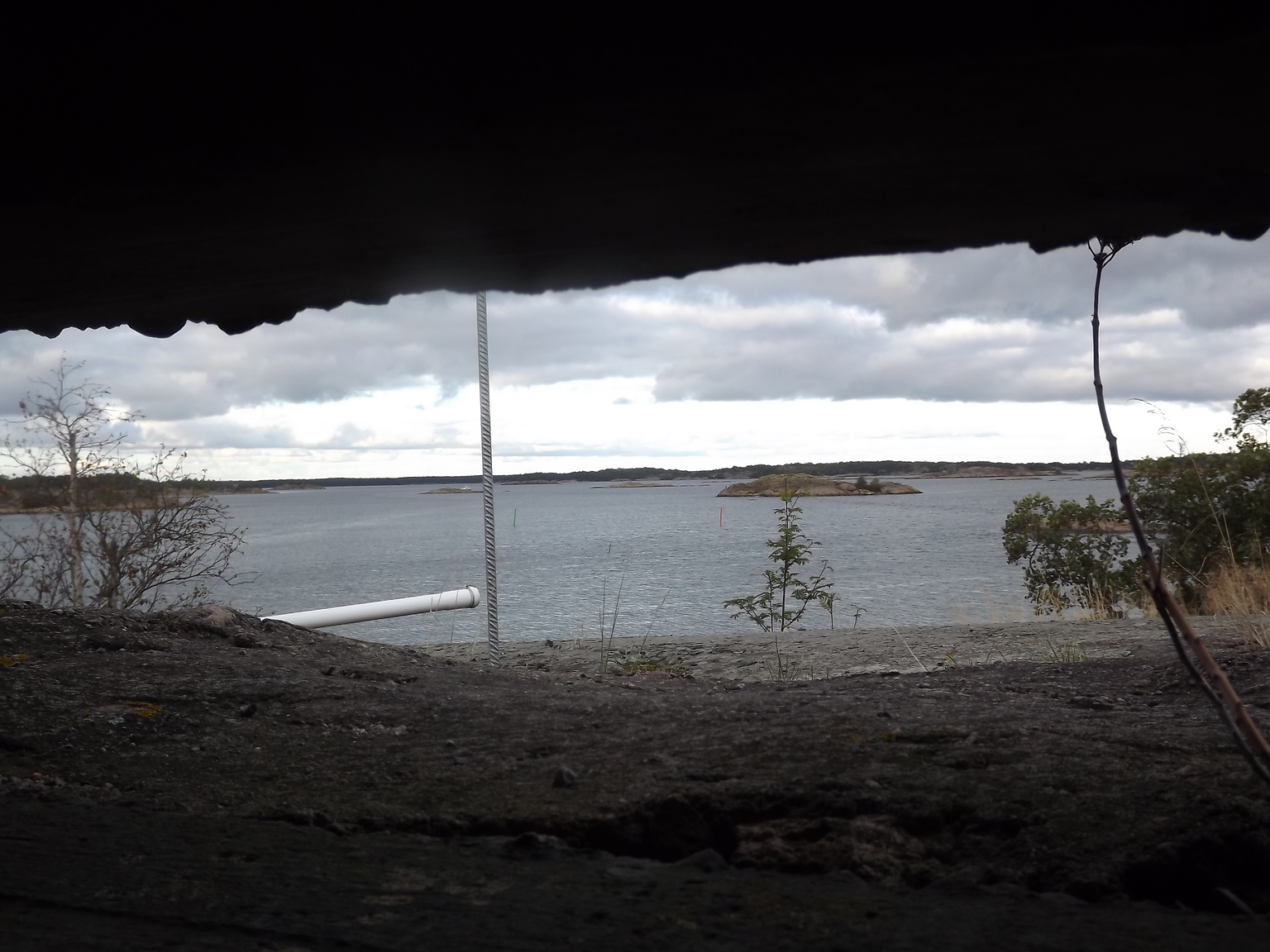
The view out of an observation post, the barrel of a 13cm gun can be seen on the left side of the photo.

The Fortifications of Örö Island, on Örö off the coast of Finland, began shortly before World War I. Work was started building positions for 4 Imperial Russian 30.5 cm, and several smaller caliber, naval guns in 1912, but by 1917, only the smaller caliber naval guns were operational. Towards the end of 1917, Örö received the 4 30.5cm guns, but the motors to move the guns hadn’t been installed, so they were still inoperable. After World War I, the island was transferred to the Finnish armed forces as part of Turku Independent Coastal Artillery Battalion, later Turku Coastal Regiment. Shortly before the Winter War, the shell stocks on the island were replenished. Örö island did not fire any of these shells however, because the Soviet forces made no attempt to attack the island. In 1941, during the Continuation War, Soviet forces bombed the island, with no results. Later that year, the guns of Örö supplied artillery support during the Battle of Bengtskär. The island was closed to the public until 2006, when the island was turned into a park. Several of the batteries and fortifications can be toured today.

== Various stages of fortifications ==
In 1917, the island was armed with:

- 4 12 cm (4.7 in) naval guns located in the north-central part of the island, facing west.
- 4 15.2cm (6in) Canet naval guns located in the southern part of the island, facing south.
- 4 30.5 cm (12 in) naval guns located on the eastern side of the island, facing south. An inscription on one of the guns says that it was meant for a battleship.

In 1947, the defenses were:

- 4 12 cm naval guns in field positions scattered across the southern tip of Örö
- 2 30.5 cm where they were originally. One of the guns can be toured today, but not all of the surrounding area is shown because it still connects to active gun batteries today.

The 4 15.2 cm guns were removed sometime before the survey, and the 4 12 cm guns in the central part of the island were removed from the original site and scattered along the southern shore of the island. There were also several M.1943 armored casemates located in the northern part of the island.

In 1967, the armament was:

- 4 15.2 cm guns where the 12 cm guns were in 1947. The 15.2 cm guns were built in revolving armored cupolas. There was an underground system of tunnels linking the 15.2 cm batteries together. At each entrance is an embrasure for a Maxim heavy machine gun that was able to fire at anyone trying to get into the tunnel system. Several machine gun domes were built into the rock overlooking the beach where the Soviets would most likely land.
- 2 30.5 cm naval guns where they had been since 1917.

The old 12 cm naval guns were removed and replaced by newer 15.2 cm naval guns with a longer range.

Armament in 1997:

- 4 15.2 cm naval guns where they had been since 1967
- 1 battery of mortars located in the central part of the island, there were also 2 M.1943 armored cupolas where the battery was built. The mortars were located in bunkers with concrete roofs that could move to allow the mortar to fire. Each of the mortar bunkers was equipped with a Maxim heavy machine gun and a M.1940 armored observation dome. The area also contained a modified M.1943 “double” armored observation casemate located near the mortar bunkers
- 3 130 53 TK guns located on the eastern side of the island. The guns are in turrets which make them look like tank turrets rather than naval guns. They are still in military service today.
- 1 observation post and infantry bunker located on the northern side of the island.
- 1 23mm Soviet anti-aircraft gun in a concrete position on the northern side of the island
- 2 23mm Soviet anti-aircraft guns in concrete positions next to each other on the northern side of the island

1 of the 2 original 30.5cm naval guns from the Imperial Russian period.

Each anti-aircraft gun was built with a shelter nearby for the crew and their accommodations.
