= Bengtskär Lighthouse =

Lighthouse in Kimitoön, Finland

Bengtskär lighthouse Bengtskär
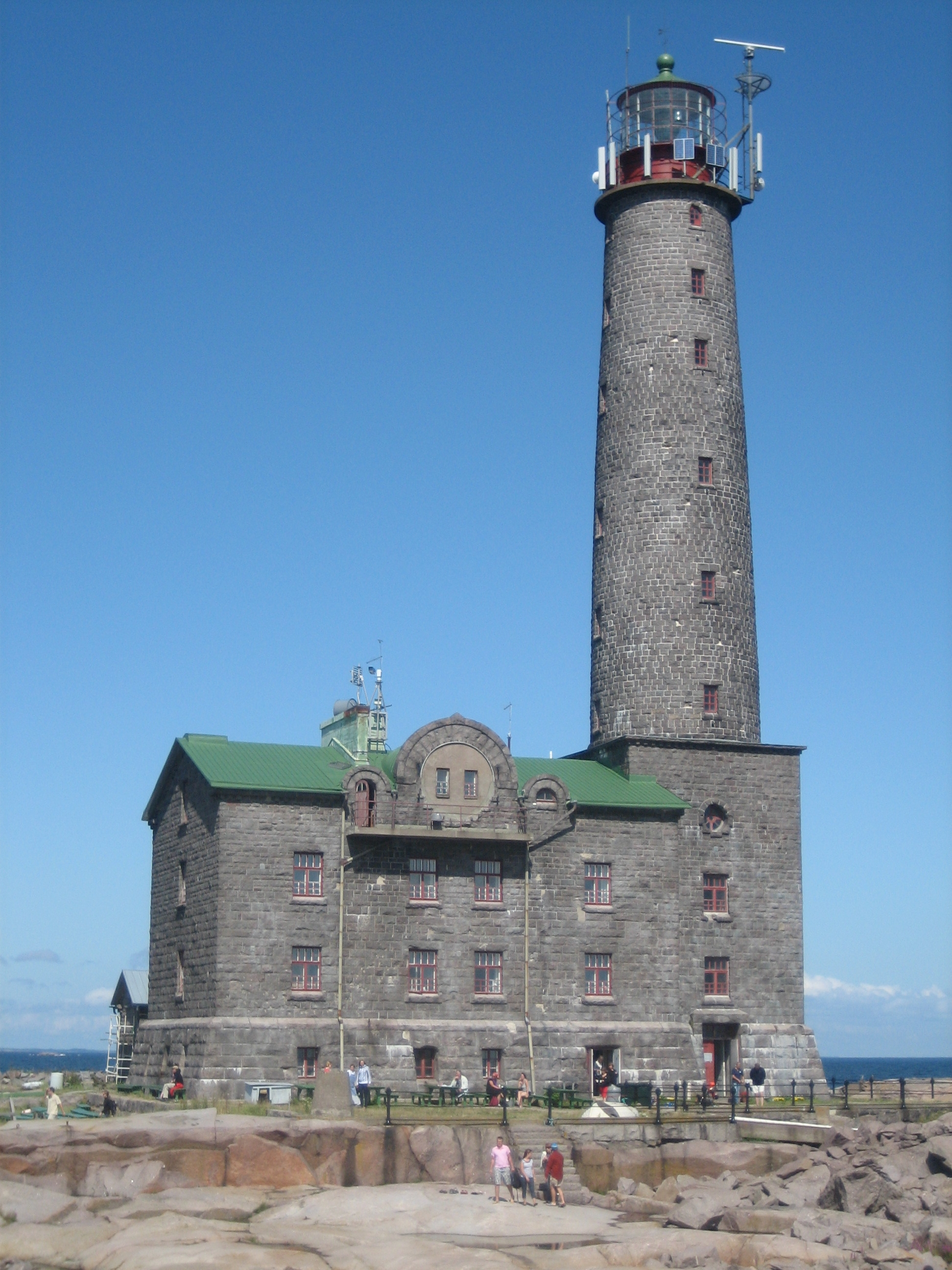
- The lighthouse in 2009
- Location: Bengtskär, Dragsfjärd, Kimitoön, Finland
- Coordinates: 59°43′24″N 22°29′57″E

Tower
- Constructed: 1906
- Construction: granite (tower), brick
- Automated: 1968
- Height: 45.8 m (150 ft)
- Shape: cylindrical tower with balcony and lantern attached to 3-1/2-story keeper's house
- Markings: Grey (tower), green (lantern, roof), red (balcony)
- Power source: kerosene, acetylene, wind turbine
- Operator: University of Turku
- Heritage: Cultural Heritage Site of National Significance

Light
- First lit: 19 December 1906
- Focal height: 51 m (167 ft)
- Range: 10 nmi (19 km; 12 mi)
- Characteristic: Fl(3) W 20s (1994–)

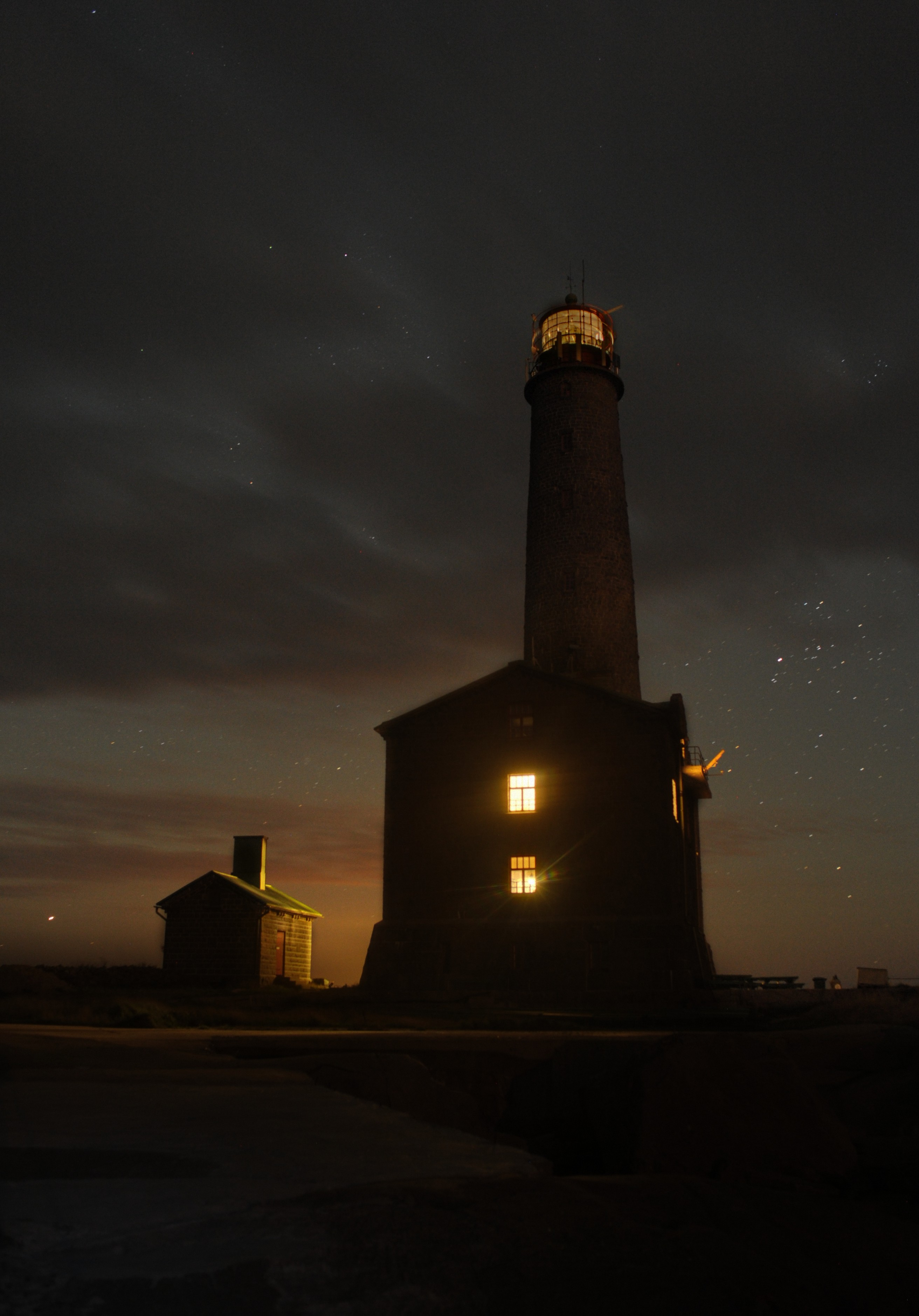
Bengtskär Lighthouse by night

Bengtskär Lighthouse is located in the Archipelago Sea about 25 kilometers south west of Hanko, Finland. It rises 52 meters above sea level and is the highest lighthouse in the Nordic countries.

== History ==
The lighthouse was built in 1906 on the Bengtskär skerry. The lighthouse had been planned for some time, but after the steamer s/s Helsingfors ran aground on New Year's Day in 1905 in the vicinity en route from Lübeck to Helsinki resulting in the death of two crew members and several others trapped on board, the project gained urgency and was completed during the following year.

Soviet troops stationed in Hanko during the Continuation War, disturbed by a Finnish observation post in the light house tried to blow up and destroy the lighthouse during the Battle of Bengtskär in 1941.

These days Bengtskär Lighthouse is a popular tourist destination and is visited annually by roughly 13,000 to 15,000 tourists. There are some hotel rooms, and a sauna made of granite.

== See also ==
- Battle of Bengtskär
