= Bengtskär =

Skerry in Kimitoön, Finland

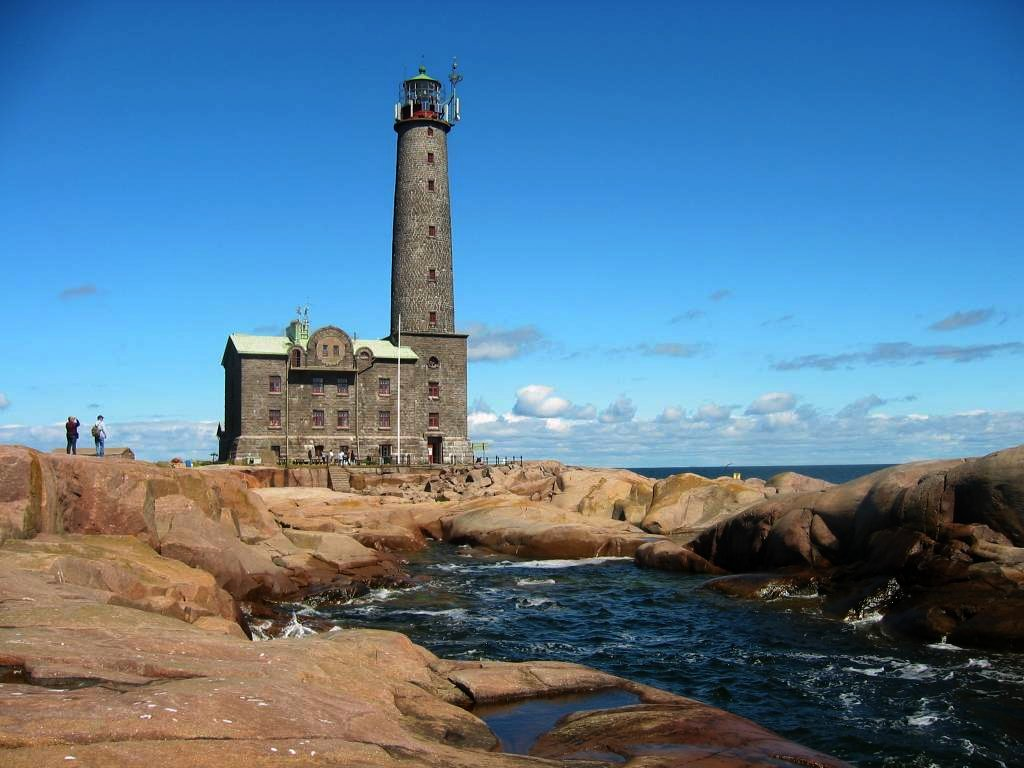
- The Bengtskär Lighthouse is a popular tourist attraction
- Interactive map of Bengtskär

Geography
- Location: Gulf of Finland, Archipelago Sea
- Coordinates: 59°43′23″N 22°29′56″E
- Archipelago: Turku
- Area: 002 km^{2} (0.77 sq mi)

Administration
- Finland
- Province: Southwest Finland

Demographics
- Population: 1

Additional information
- Official website: www.bengtskar.fi

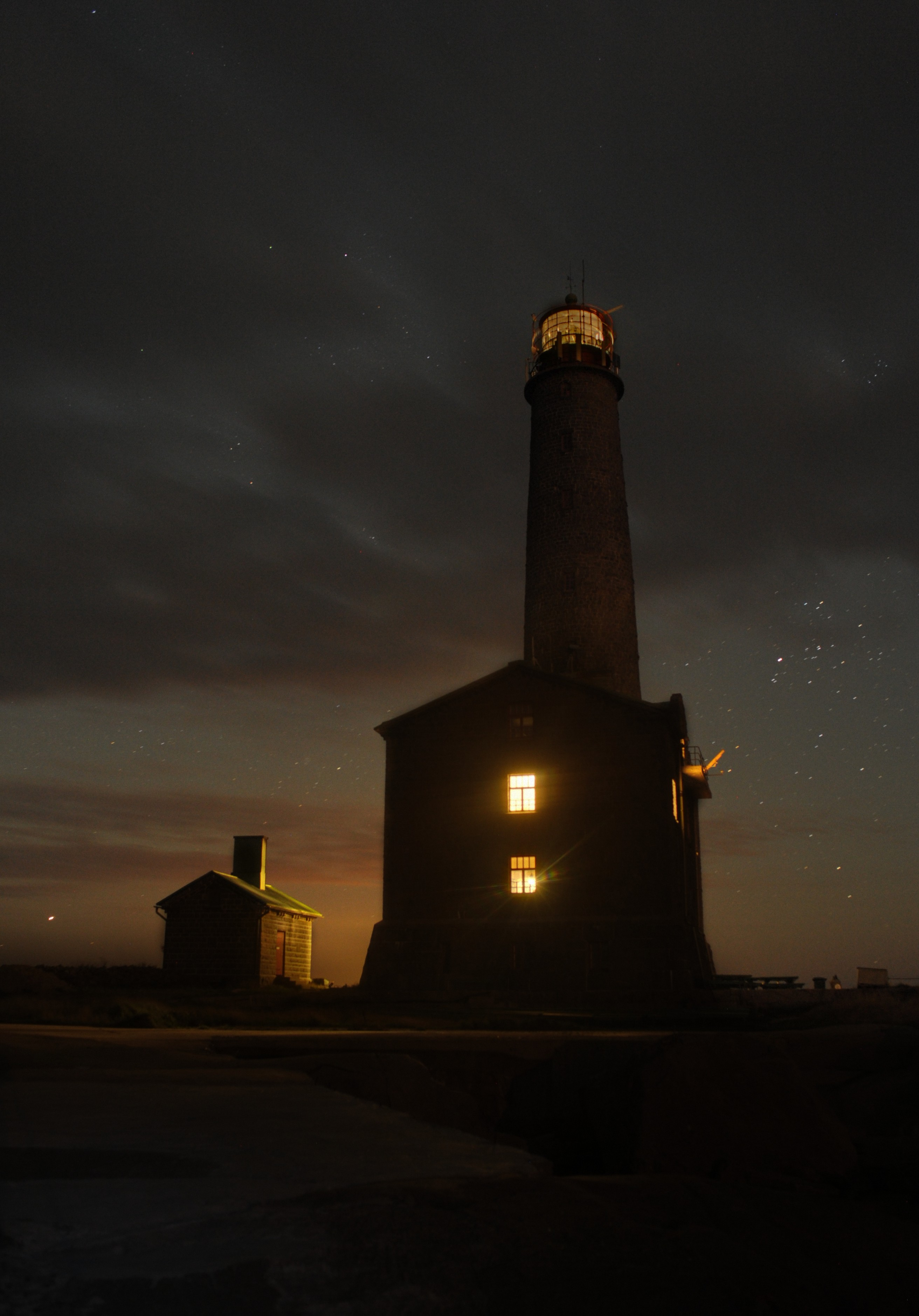
Bengtskär Lighthouse by night

Bengtskär is a Finnish island 25 kilometres (16 mi) southwest of Hanko, and part of the municipality of Kimitoön. This rocky island can be reached by ferry from the village of Kasnäs. The island has an area of about two hectares, and only a small part of it is covered with vegetation, the rest is a naked granite.

The Bengtskär Lighthouse on the skerry is the highest one in the Nordic countries, with a tower height of (46 m or 151 ft). The lighthouse is owned by the Foundation of the University of Turku. Annually the island attracts over 13,000 tourists.

On 26 July 1941, during the Continuation War Soviet troops attempted to capture and blow up the lighthouse, but the Finnish garrison managed to repel the attack. The lighthouse was damaged but not destroyed.

== See also ==
- Battle of Bengtskär
