= Kasnäs =

Village in the municipality of Kimitoön, Finland

Coordinates: 59°55′N 22°25′E

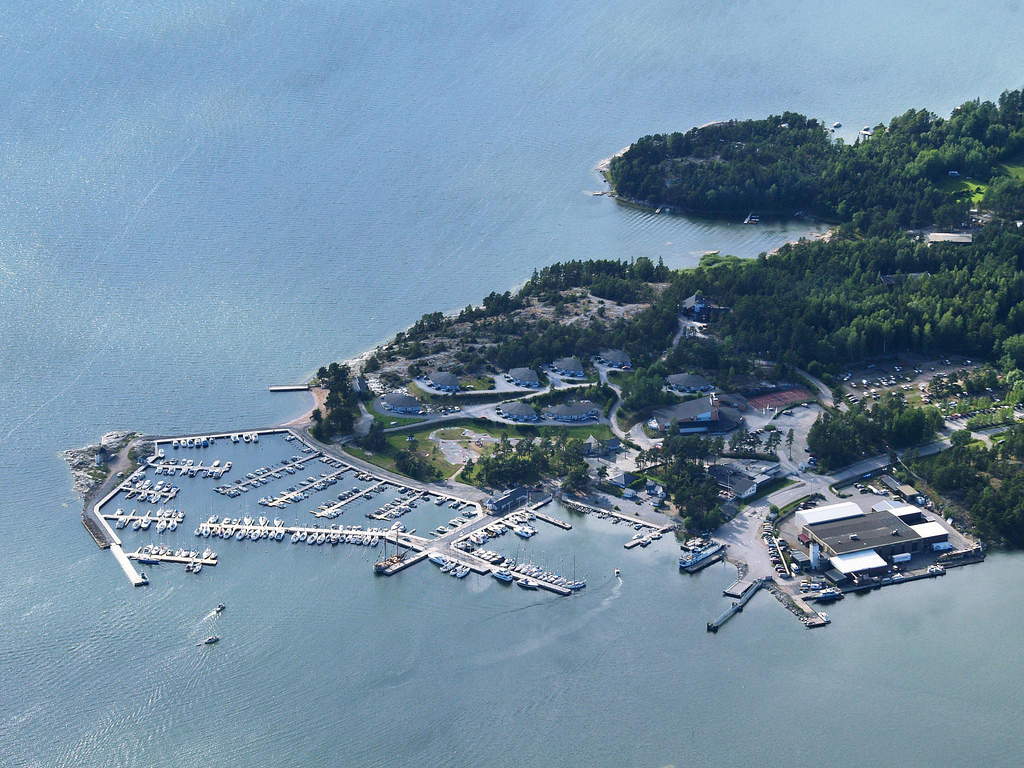
Kasnäs

Kasnäs is a village in the municipality of Kimitoön, Finland. It belongs to the archipelago of Hitis. Blåmusslan, one of the two information centers of the Archipelago National Park is situated here. The ferries to the archipelago of Hitis, including Vänö and Tunnhamn, leave from here. There is also a guest harbour and a spa hotel in Kasnäs.

Since the completion of Lövö Bridge in 2011, Kasnäs is the most southwesterly part of the municipality with a fixed road connection.
