= SS Helsingfors (1903) =

Finnish steamship built in 1903

History

Finland
- Name: Helsingfors
- Namesake: Helsinki
- Owner: Helsingfors Ångfartygs Aktiebolaget
- Port of registry: Helsinki
- Builder: Chantier Naval Anversois, Antwerp
- Yard number: 24
- Launched: 8 August 1903
- Fate: Ran aground and sank 1904

General characteristics
- Tonnage: 759 GRT
- Length: 63.00 metres (206 ft 8 in)
- Beam: 9.12 metres (29 ft 11 in)
- Installed power: Triple expansion steam engine, 800 ihp
- Propulsion: Screw propeller

Helsingfors was a Finnish freight and passenger steamship built in Belgium in 1903 for Helsingfors Ångfartygs Aktiebolaget. She ran aground during heavy seas and sank near Bengtskär on 1 January 1905. The accident resulted in the construction of the Bengtskär Lighthouse.

== Description ==
Helsingfors was 63.00 metres (206 ft 8 in) long, with a beam of 9.12 metres (29 ft 11 in). Her triple expansion steam engine, made by North Eastern Marine Engineers Ltd, Sunderland, United Kingdom, was rated at 800 ihp. She was assessed at 759 GRT.

== History ==
Helsingfors was built as yard number 24 by Chantiers Navals Anversois, Hoboken, Antwerp, Belgium. She was launched on 8 August 1903 and completed two months later. She was built to carry passengers and freight and was owned and operated by Helsingfors Ångfartygs Aktiebolaget.

During the night of 31 December 1904, Helsingfors ran aground during a gale near Bengtskär, 16 miles (26 km) southwest of Hanko, and sank on New Year's Day. She was on a voyage from Fowey, United Kingdom to Hanko with a cargo of kaolinite. The Finnish salvage vessel Protector also ran aground and was holed whilst going to her assistance. Two crew from Helsingfors, three from Protector and a pilot were drowned. These wrecks motivated the construction of the Bengtskär Lighthouse. The wreck was sold in 1906 for 401 Markka.

The broken remains of the vessel lie in 8 to 13 metres (26 to 43 ft) of water.
