= Olavi Saarinen =

Finnish politician (1923–1979)

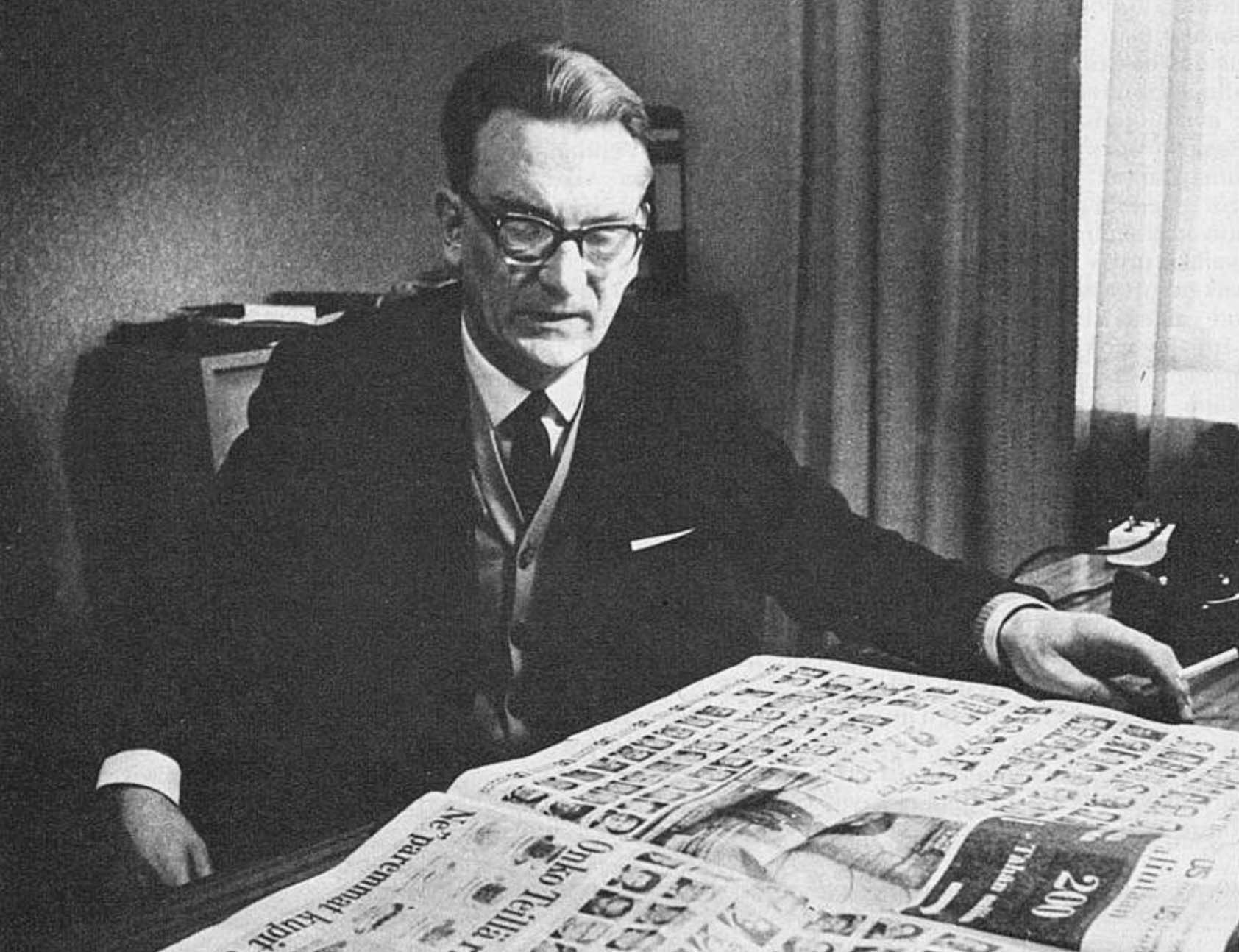
Saarinen in 1970

Olavi Saarinen (18 October 1923, in Dragsfjärd – 30 November 1979) was a Finnish trade union activist and politician. He was at first a member of the Social Democratic Party of Finland and, after 1959, of the Social Democratic Union of Workers and Smallholders. He served as a Minister of Social affairs and Health from 13 April 1962, to 17 October 1963, and as a Member of Parliament from 5 April 1966, to 22 March 1970.
