= Archipelago National Park =

National park in Finland

- IUCN category II (national park)
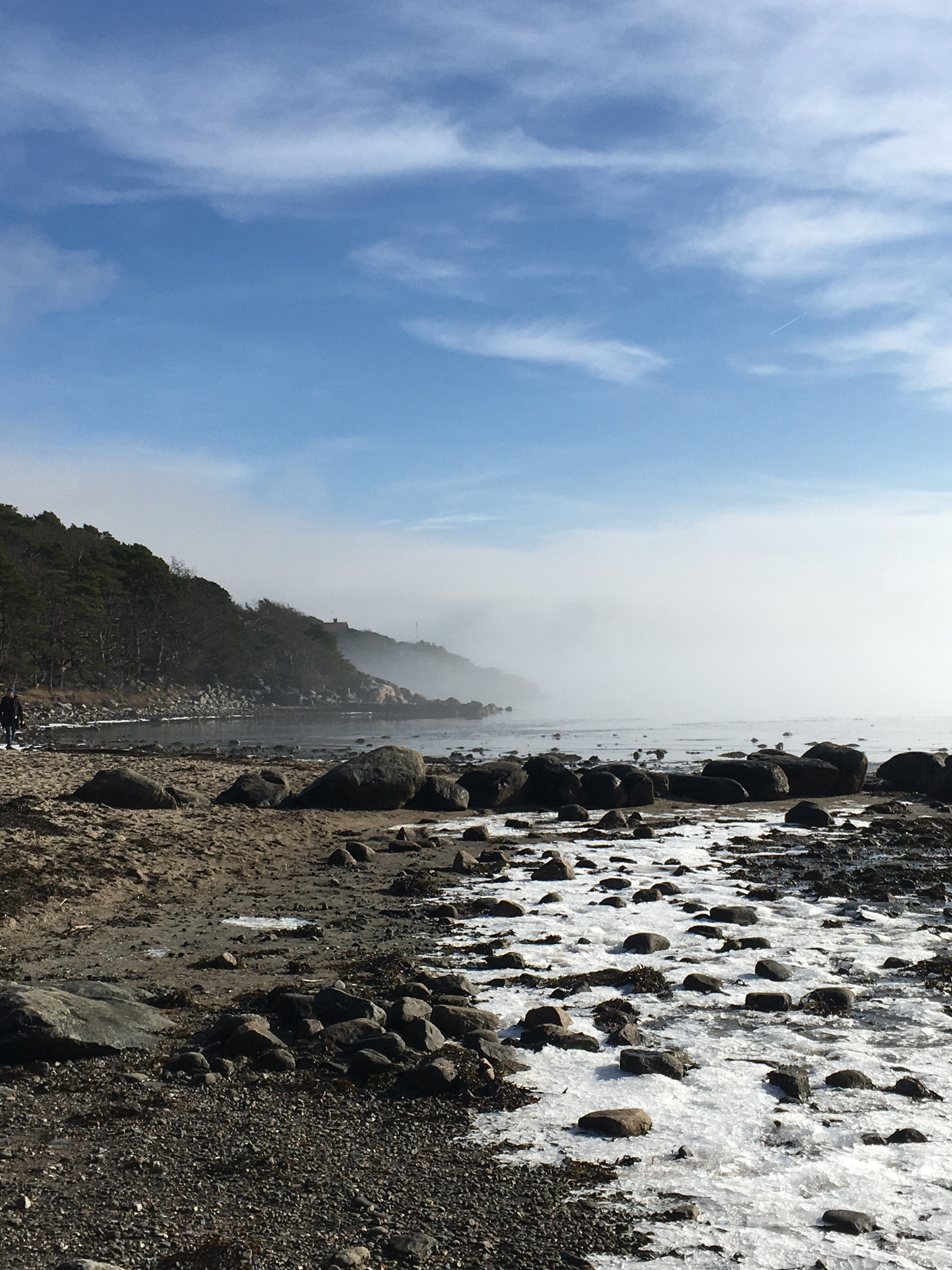
- Särö peninsula in Archipelago National Park

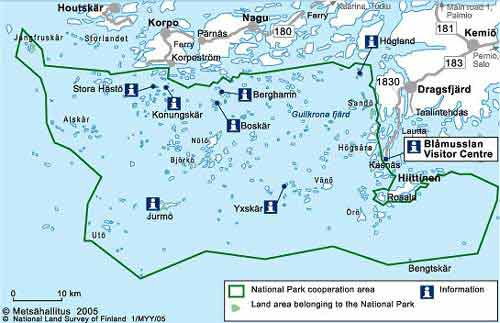

- Location within Finland
- Interactive map of Archipelago National Park
- Location: Southwest Finland, Finland
- Coordinates: 59°54′53″N 21°52′39″E
- Area: 500 km^{2} (190 sq mi)
- Established: 1983
- Visitors: 78,800 (in 2024)
- Governing body: Metsähallitus
- Website: https://www.luontoon.fi/en/destinations/archipelago-national-park

Archipelago National Park (Swedish: Skärgårdshavets nationalpark, Finnish: Saaristomeren kansallispuisto) is a national park in Southwest Finland. It was established in 1983 and includes 500 km^{2} (190 sq mi) of land area. Most of the land is on islands smaller than 1 km^{2} (0.39 sq mi). The park encompasses about 2,000 of the 8,400 islets and skerries within the cooperative area. The larger islands are mainly owned by their inhabitants. Archipelago National Park is part of the UNESCO biosphere reserves and received a PAN Parks certificate in 2007.

The park encompasses most of the Archipelago Sea region east of Åland and south of the main islands of Korpo, Nagu, Pargas, and Kimitoön. The park is mainly situated in the (former) municipalities of Nagu, Korpo, Houtskär, Iniö, Hitis, and southern Pargas. The Archipelago Sea Biosphere reserve consists of the national park's cooperative area and the rest of the islands in the Åboland archipelago only accessible by boat or ferry.

One of the objectives of the national park is to protect the archipelago's cultural landscape—such as the considerable areas used for traditional agriculture—in addition to the natural landscape. To this end, the cooperative area is an essential extension of the national park.

== History ==
=== Early human settlement ===
The archipelago of Southwest Finland has been populated since the end of the Neolithic (roughly 2000 BCE). The rich natural resources attracted people to the post-glacial archipelago during the Stone Age and Bronze Age. At the time, the Baltic Sea was saltier, thus offering large catches of fish, such as Atlantic cod. The area also supported large populations of grey seals and seabirds, the latter of which were rich sources of eggs, meat, and down for early humans. There were also good conditions for small-scale agriculture and cattle herding, thanks to a warmer climate at the time.

Due to post-glacial rebound, the habitable islands in the Archipelago Sea have slowly risen over time. The ground still rises in the Archipelago Sea at a rate of approximately 3–4.2 mm (0.12–0.17 in) per year. During the Neolithic period and the Bronze Age, the archipelago's outermost islets were located around the present-day main islands of Nagu, Korpo, and Houtskär. Meanwhile, the outermost islets of the present-day archipelago were still 20–25 metres (66–82 ft) below sea level. As islands surfaced and grew in area, inhabitants moved farther out in the archipelago. Prehistoric sites illustrate this change in topography. For example, the Neolithic settlement of Bötesberget in the municipality of Dragsfjärd, dated from 6000 BCE, would have originally been on an isolated island in the middle of open water. Today, the site is 55 metres (180 ft) above sea level, on forested upland.

The present national park area became inhabited during the Iron Age (500 BCE–800 CE, in Northern Europe). Remains of Iron Age settlements have been found in the park's cooperative area (so far, no Stone Age settlements have been found within this area). Two prehistoric fort islets have also been recognized in the archipelago, possibly dating back to the Iron Age. Sailing in the Baltic Sea region began at least by the Bronze Age. The southwestern archipelago became a part of the northern Baltic Sea region cultures, which had common means of livelihood, use of metals, and burial customs. Trade, handicraft, and navigation were also practiced. Pollen analysis has shown that agriculture along the coast has been continuous since the Iron Age.

=== Prehistoric sites ===
The archipelago has many characteristic relics—dating from the end of the Iron Age until the 18th and 19th century—which are protected by the Antiquities Act. One of the most significant types of relics are burial mounds. About 40 burial mounds, called cairns, have been found throughout the cooperation area of Archipelago National Park. These are constructed from small, low heaps of stones. Most, if not all, date from the Iron Age. The diameter of some low cairns is a few metres, but some are tens of metres long and a couple of metres high. The Finnish folk-name for these cairns translates literally as "Devil's sauna stove".

In the beginning of the Bronze Age, barrows were used to entomb dead bodies, sometimes with jewelry or weapons; later, cremation became customary. Most barrows were originally built on larger islands, which have since expanded due to land uplift. Often, the burial sites were chosen so as to stand out from the surrounding landscape, such as on rocky hills with a view to the sea, or near (but not atop) the highest place on an island. Other graves are near the shore, and some are organized in groups.

Inside the park's cooperative area, most graves have been found on the large islands of Nötö and Hitis. During the Iron Age, these areas would have bristled with islets, and were close to fishing and seal hunting grounds in the outer archipelago. Given these favourable natural conditions, these areas may already have been inhabited.

=== Later developments ===
In the late 13th century, Swedish settlers moved to the area from Svealand, southern Norrland, and Götaland, substantially increasing the population. About half of the villages in the Archipelago National Park cooperative area were inhabited by the Middle Ages. The population in the archipelago increased until the mid-16th century, after which it started to decline rapidly due to insufficient natural resources. Further decline occurred in the early 18th century due to the Great Northern War and the bubonic plague.

In the mid-19th century, technical development in fishing methods (such as hook and drift nets) made it possible for people to live outside traditional villages, leading to fast population growth. In the beginning of the 20th century, people left the archipelago, attracted by work opportunities on the mainland. Unused pastureland and meadows were gradually reforested. Starting in the 1970s, the population began to grow again, as the archipelago became a popular summer holiday destination.

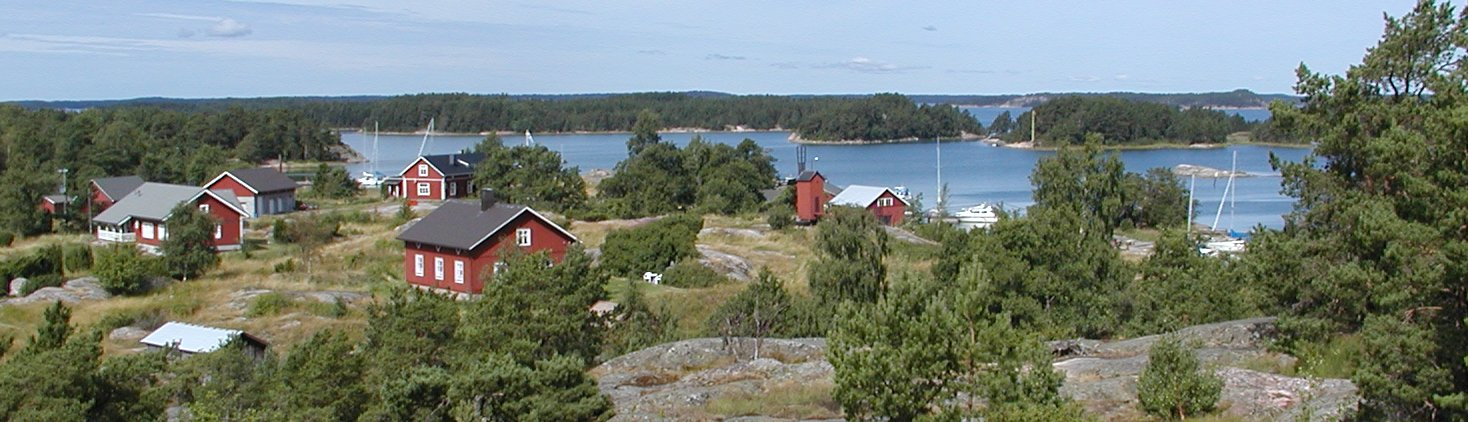
The village of Gullkrona in Nagu, within the national park

== Fauna ==
The fauna of the Archipelago National Park is well-known due to research and regular follow-ups. Twenty-five species of mammals have been identified; the most common ones include the common shrew, pygmy shrew, mountain hare, bank vole, red fox, raccoon dog, mink, and moose. The number of grey seal have increased in recent years, whereas ringed seal numbers have decreased.

The most common species of fish include the Baltic herring, European perch, northern pike, common roach, bream, viviparous eelpout, European flounder, and fourhorn sculpin.

=== Birds ===
Over 130 species of birds are known to have nested in the national park.

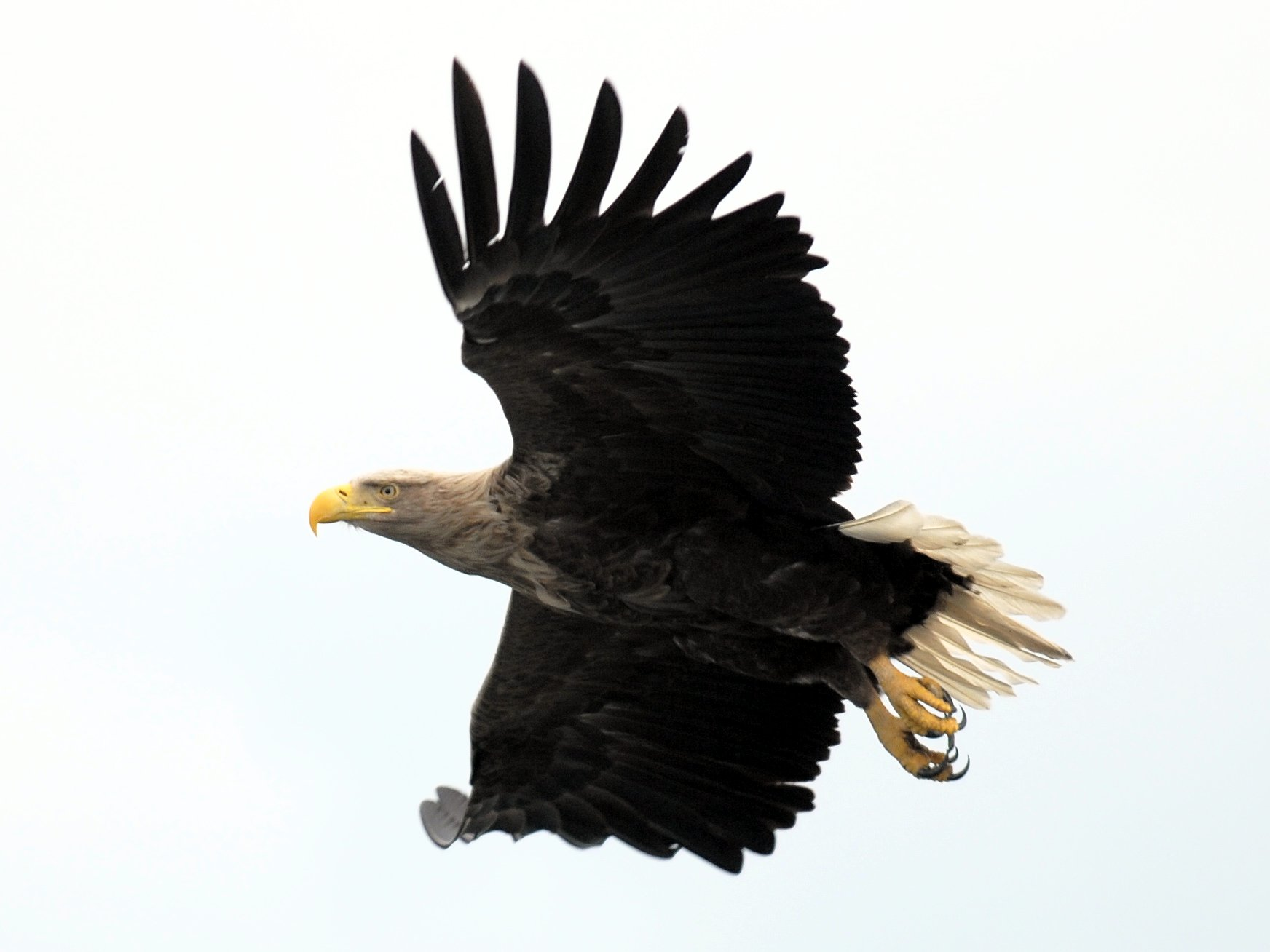
The white-tailed eagle is the symbol of the Archipelago National Park

Common

- Arctic tern
- black guillemot
- common gull
- common redshank
- common sandpiper
- common whitethroat
- Eurasian oystercatcher
- European herring gull
- European rock pipit
- great black-backed gull
- great cormorant
- goosander
- hooded crow
- lesser whitethroat
- mallard
- meadow pipit
- mute swan
- northern wheatear
- red-breasted merganser
- ruddy turnstone
- thrush nightingale
- tufted duck
- white wagtail

Less Common

- Arctic skua
- barnacle goose
- barred warbler
- black grouse
- Caspian tern
- common raven
- common shelduck
- common tern
- Eurasian eagle-owl
- Eurasian woodcock
- gadwall
- greylag goose
- horned grebe
- icterine warbler
- lesser black-backed gull
- northern lapwing
- northern shoveler
- razorbill
- ringed plover
- white-tailed eagle

Rare

- common murre
- short-billed dunlin
- little tern
- long-eared owl
- ruff
- short-eared owl

=== Removal of mink ===
Following the removal of mink from the Archipelago National Park in the 1990s, many bird species increased in numbers and experienced improved nesting success. Out of the 22 species of archipelago birds studied, 14 showed an increase in numbers. Some species (tufted duck, velvet scoter, Arctic tern) increased greatly. In 2006, removal of mink was initiated in the Vänö archipelago in southern Dragsfjärd. Here again, the results show that the nesting success of some species increased greatly and rapidly.

== Visiting the park ==
Transportation in the Archipelago National Park is mainly by boat. There are shuttle ship connections to all of the inhabited islands within the cooperative area. The islands of Holma, Jurmo, and Berghamn are accessible by shuttle ship and national park services offered on the islands. The shuttle ship harbours at Prostvik and Pärnäs in Nagu and Kasnäs in Kimitoön are accessible by road and have bus connections. Both the Blue Mussel visitor center in Kasnäs, Kimitoön, and the Archipelago Centre in Korpoström, Korpo, offer information on the Archipelago Sea and the Archipelago National Park. They can both be reached by car and have bus connections.

Visitors may move around freely by boat within the national park, except in some protected areas. Camping is allowed only in designated places (allowed on privately own lands in accordance with the freedom to roam). Building campfires is allowed only in designated places, unless mandated otherwise (i.e., fire-making is prohibited if a forest fire warning is in effect). Picking berries and mushrooms is permitted. Mind roosting birds when landing on islets; those with many nesting birds should only be visited in autumn and winter. There are nature trails on some of the islands. There is an underwater trail for divers on Stora Hästö in Korpo, and one in shallower water for snorkelers.

== Literature ==
- Miettinen, Mika 1996: Saaristomeren kansallispuiston eteläosan ja eteläisen Selkämeren pesimälinnusto 1993. - Metsähallitus, Vantaa. ISBN 951-53-0865-8 (In Finnish with English abstract)
- Mietinen, Mika; Stjernberg, Torsten & Högmander, Jouko 1997: Breeding bird fauna in the Southwestern Archipelago National Park and in its cooperative area in the beginning of the 1970s and 1990s. - Metsähallitus. Vantaa. ISBN 951-53-1236-1 (In Finnish with English abstract)

== See also ==
- List of national parks of Finland
- Protected areas of Finland
