= Niklas Hollsten =

Finnish snowboarder

Niklas Hollsten (born 15 November 1983 in Kimito) is a Finnish freeride snowboarder.

== Career ==
He has represented Finland in freeride already for several years. In 2010 Scandinavian freeride championships he won the gold medal. Furthermore, he in overall 2010 freeride world qualifier ranking he received the third place. He is also the first ever Finnish male who participated Freeride World Tour. Though Hollsten has a freestyle and boardercross background right now he competes only in freeride.
