= Battle of Bengtskär =

1941 battle of the Continuation War

- Part of Continuation War
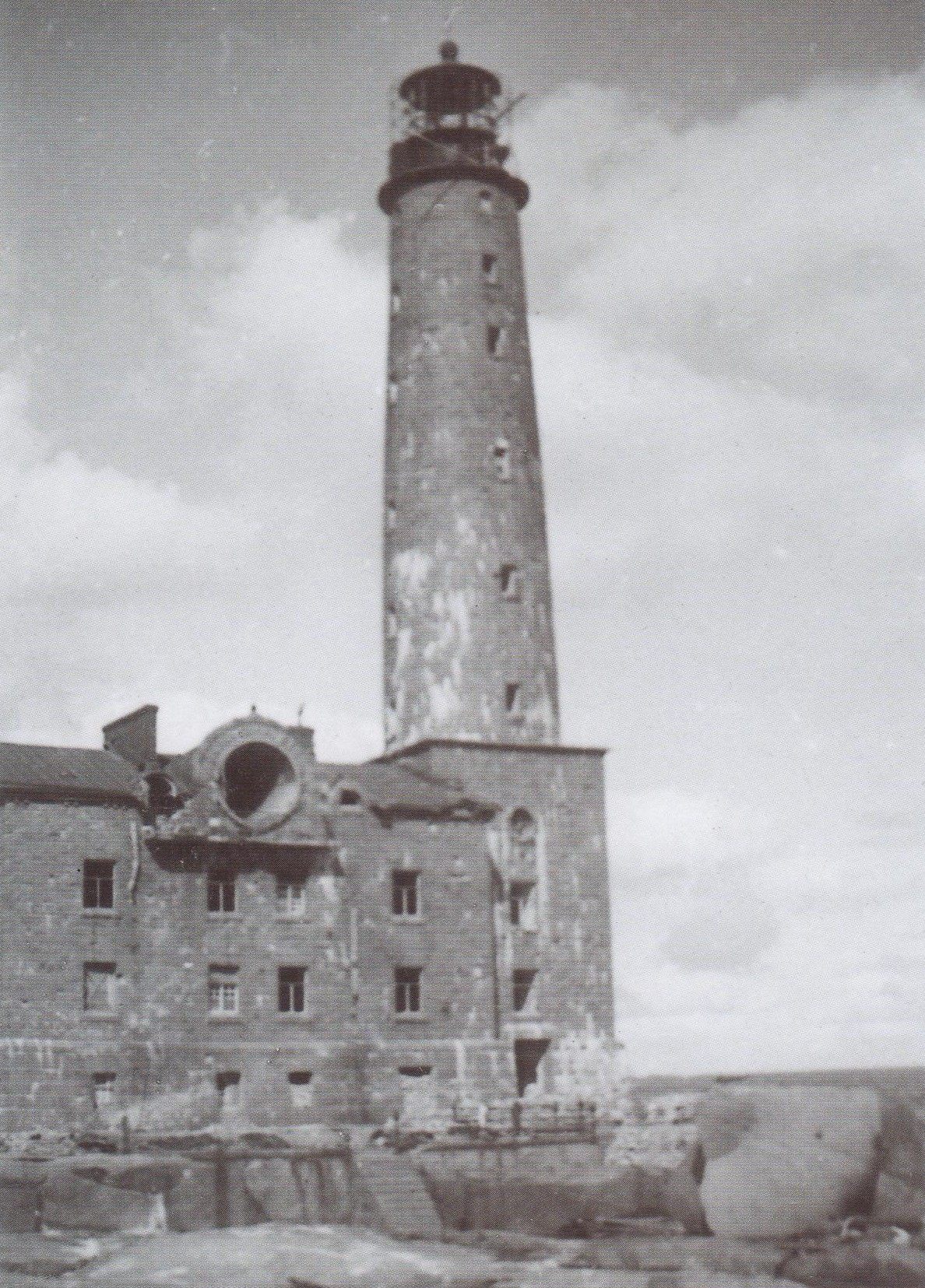
- Bengtskär Lighthouse damaged after the battle in 1941
Date	26 July 1941
Location	Bengtskär skerry, Finland
Result	Finnish victory

Belligerents
Finland	Soviet Union

Commanders and leaders
Lieutenant Fred Luther	First Lieutenant Pavel Kurilov †

Strength
2 gunboats 41 men (garrison) + 83 men (reinforcements)	10 MO-class patrol boats 31–100+ men (landing party)

Casualties and losses
31 killed 45 wounded	1 patrol boat sunk 31–80+ killed 24–29 captured

The Battle of Bengtskär was an amphibious landing action fought between Finnish and Soviet forces on 26 July 1941 during the Continuation War.

== Background ==
As a result of the Moscow Peace Treaty, Finland lost the city and port of Hanko to the Soviet Union. The port was used as a base by the Soviet Baltic Fleet from which they could dominate the Gulf of Finland. When the Continuation War broke out in 1941, Finnish forces besieged Hanko. The port in Hanko was within range of the heavy guns at Örö fortress, but a forward observation post was needed to direct their fire.

The first forward observation post was set up on islet Morgonland, east of Bengtskär. This post was attacked and overrun by a Soviet amphibious assault on 16 July. After this, a new observation post was set up at Bengtskär, which was reinforced by a platoon of Finnish marines under the command of Lieutenant Fred Luther.

== Battle ==
Soviet landing troops made a surprise attack on the island of Bengtskär with the goal to blow up the lighthouse situated on the island so that it would not disturb Soviet military operations. Finnish troops present on the island managed to defend the lighthouse and eventually drove the Soviets back with the help of support troops.

The landing was made with four MO-class patrol boats, while another 6 boats were later dispatched to retrieve the Soviet forces once it was clear the demolition attempt had failed. Finnish gunboats Uusimaa and Hämeenmaa engaged the Soviets, with Uusimaa sinking the patrol boat PK-306 with gunfire.

== Results ==
The battle resulted in a Finnish victory, due to the intervention of the gunboats. 16 Soviet sailors were saved and captured from the sinking PK-306. Another 13 were captured on the Island. Some Soviet soldiers committed suicide with hand-grenades. Finnish estimates puts Soviet losses at 60 killed, 40 of them on land.

Finnish forces suffered a loss of 16 men in the garrison and 4 men on the ships. The next day a Soviet aerial bombing killed another 11 men waiting to be evacuated. Soviet sources report that the landing party consisted of 31 men. Casualties were 31 killed, including 8 sailors, and 24 prisoners, including 16 sailors.
