= Slag brick =

Building material

Slag bricks are a building material made of slag left over from blast furnaces. In modern times, "slag brick is made by mixing, watering, grinding and pressing slag and limestone. In the production process of slag brick, the particle size of the slag is generally smaller than 8 mm, and the steam temperature injected into the kiln is about 80 °C to 100 °C, the maintaining time is about 12 hours." Blast furnace slag in granulated form has also been used as binder in mortar for building construction.

Historic buildings constructed of slag brick are common in the traditional iron-working areas of Sweden (Slaggtegel) and Finland. Imperial Steel Works in Japan was a source of slag for brick production. Slag brick was introduced in Scotland in the late 19th century. In the Tees valley of Yorkshire slag bricks are also called scoria brick and were used for road construction. Slag brick walls can be found in Butte, Montana, U.S.
