= Kimito =

Former municipality of Finland

Kimito Kimito – Kemiö
- Former municipality
- Coat of arms

- Location of Kimito in Finland.
- Interactive map of Kimito
- Location within Southwest Finland Location within Finland Location within Europe
- Country: Finland
- Province: Western Finland
- Region: Southwest Finland
- Sub-region: Åboland
- Consolidated into Kimitoön: 2009

Government
  - Municipal manager: Tom Simola

Area
  - Total: 320.17 km^{2} (123.62 sq mi)
  - Land: 317.88 km^{2} (122.73 sq mi)

Population (2004-12-31)
  - Total: 3,301
  - Density: 10.38/km^{2} (26.90/sq mi)
  - Urbanisation: 39.3%
- Time zone: UTC+02:00 (EET)
  - Summer (DST): UTC+03:00 (EEST)
- Official languages: Swedish, Finnish
- Unemployment rate: 7.2%

Kimito (Swedish: [ˈtɕimito]; Finnish: Kemiö [ˈkemiø]) is a former municipality of Finland. On January 1, 2009, it was consolidated with Dragsfjärd and Västanfjärd to form the new municipality of Kimitoön. Prior to the consolidation, it was one of the four municipalities located on Kimito island, the other three being Västanfjärd, Dragsfjärd and Halikko.

It is located in the province of Western Finland and is part of the Southwest Finland region. The municipality had a population of 3,301 (2004-12-31) and covered an area of 320.17 km^{2} (excluding sea) of which 2.29 km^{2} is inland water. The population density was 10.38 inhabitants per km^{2}.

The municipality was bilingual, with majority being Swedish and minority Finnish speakers.

It was the place where Tantalum was discovered along with Ytterby.

== Events ==
- Kimito Island Music Festival
- Baltic Jazz Festival
- Norpas Festival
- mörkÖ Festival

== Notable people ==
- Amos Anderson (1878–1961), Finnish entrepreneur and patron of the arts
- Niklas Hollsten (born 1983), Finnish freeride snowboarder
