= Dragsfjärd =

Former municipality of Finland, now part of Kimitoön

- Former municipality
- Coat of arms

- Location of Dragsfjärd in Finland (2008).
- Interactive map of Dragsfjärd
- Location within Southwest Finland Location within Finland Location within Europe
- Country: Finland
- Province: Western Finland
- Region: Southwest Finland
- Sub-region: Åboland
- Consolidated into Kimitoön: 2009

Government
  - Municipal manager: Klas Nyström

Area
  - Total: 274.95 km^{2} (106.16 sq mi)
  - Land: 266.78 km^{2} (103.00 sq mi)

Population (2004-12-31)
  - Total: 3,378
  - Density: 12.66/km^{2} (32.79/sq mi)
  - Urbanisation: 62.7%
- Time zone: UTC+02:00 (EET)
  - Summer (DST): UTC+03:00 (EEST)
- Official languages: Swedish, Finnish
- Unemployment rate: 8.3%

Dragsfjärd is a former municipality of Finland. On 1 January 2009, it was consolidated with Kimito and Västanfjärd to form the new municipality of Kimitoön. The municipality of Hitis was merged to Dragsfjärd in 1969.

It is located in the province of Western Finland and is part of the Southwest Finland region. The municipality had a population of 3,378 (2004-12-31) and covered an area of 274.95 km^{2} of which 8.17 km^{2} was water. The population density was 12.66 inhabitants per km^{2}.

The western part of the municipality belongs to the Southwestern Archipelago National Park and forms the eastern part of the park.

The municipality was bilingual, with 76% of the population being Swedish speakers and 21% being Finnish speakers.

== People from Dragsfjärd ==
- Artur Wuorimaa (1854–1921)
- Wilhelm Ramsay (1865–1928)
- Gottfrid Lindström (1887–1975)
- Allan Wallenius (1890–1942)
- Olavi Saarinen (1923–1979)
- Conny Karlsson (born 1975)
- Ahti Fredriksson (1923–1994)
