= Kimitoön =

Kimitoön Kimitoön – Kemiönsaari
- Municipality
- Kimitoöns kommun Kemiönsaaren kunta
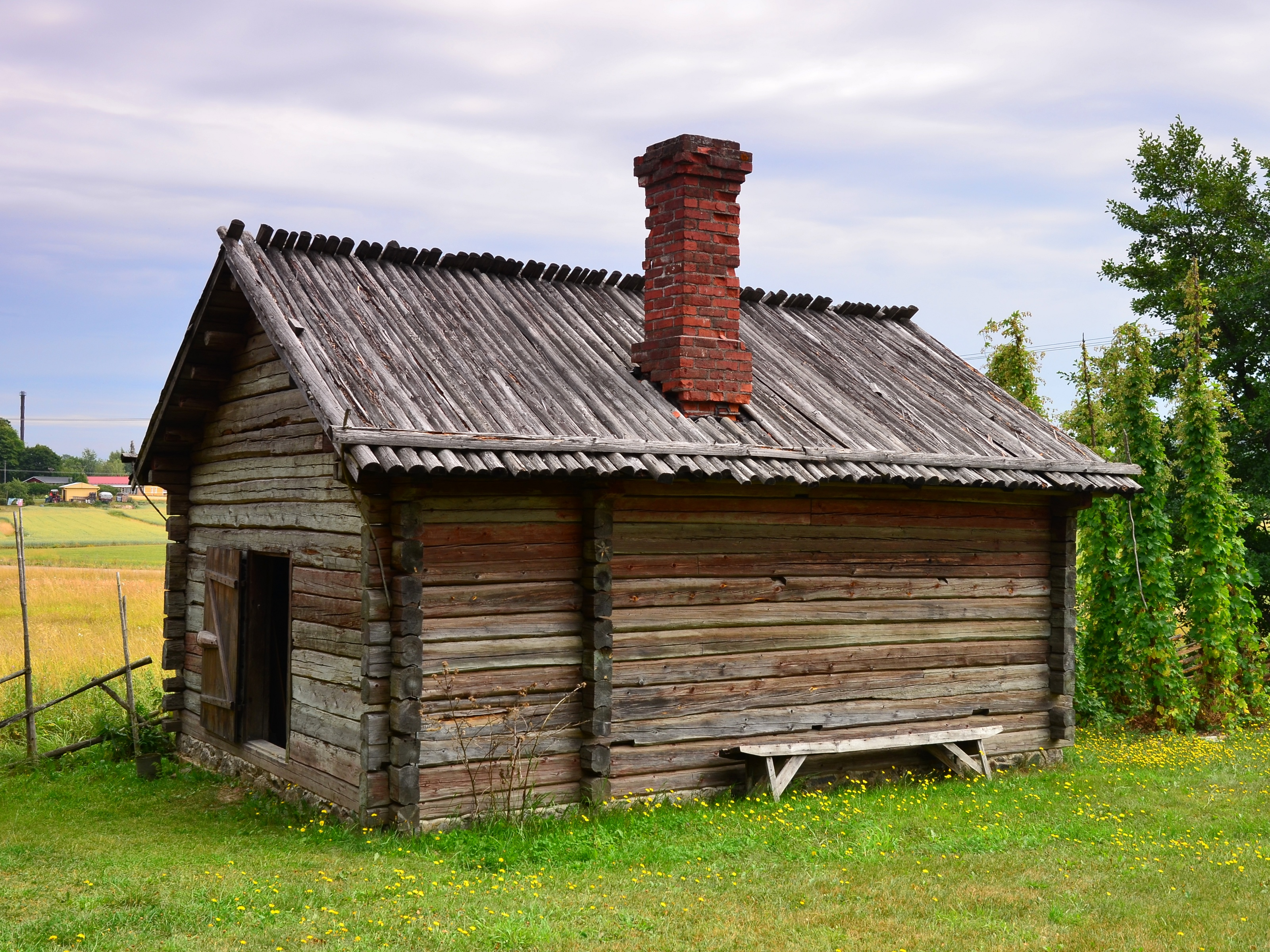
- An old sauna, Sagalund outdoor museum, Kimito, Finland

- Flag Coat of arms

- Location of Kimitoön in Finland
- Interactive map of Kimitoön
- Coordinates: 60°10′N 022°44′E
- Country: Finland
- Region: Southwest Finland
- Sub-region: Åboland
- Charter: 2009

Government
  - Municipal manager: Erika Strandberg

Area (2018-01-01)
  - Total: 2,800.99 km^{2} (1,081.47 sq mi)
  - Land: 686.91 km^{2} (265.22 sq mi)
  - Water: 2,113.94 km^{2} (816.20 sq mi)
  - Rank: 123rd largest in Finland

Population (2025-12-31)
  - Total: 6,340
  - Rank: 146th largest in Finland
  - Density: 9.23/km^{2} (23.9/sq mi)

Population by native language
  - Swedish: 65.3% (official)
  - Finnish: 30% (official)
  - Others: 4.7%

Population by age
  - 0 to 14: 11.9%
  - 15 to 64: 53.3%
  - 65 or older: 34.8%
- Time zone: UTC+02:00 (EET)
  - Summer (DST): UTC+03:00 (EEST)
- Website: en.kimitoon.fi

Kimitoön (Swedish: [t̠ʃimitoøːn]; Finnish: Kemiönsaari; Finnish: [ˈkemiønˌsɑːri]) is a municipality and island of Finland. It was created on 1 January 2009, when the municipalities of Dragsfjärd, Kimito and Västanfjärd were consolidated into a single municipality. The former municipal councils accepted the merger on 26 June 2007.

The municipality is located in the Archipelago Sea in the Southwest Finland region. The municipality has a population of 6,340 (31 December 2025) and covers an area of 2,800.99 square kilometres (1,081.47 sq mi) of which 2,113.94 km^{2} (816.20 sq mi) is water. The population density is 9.23 inhabitants per square kilometre (23.9/sq mi). The actual island is the largest coastal island of Finland with an area of 524 square kilometres (202 sq mi). It is situated in the Southwest Finland region in Western Finland province. The island has a population of 7,500 divided between the two municipalities: Kimitoön and Salo of which Salo is mostly located on the mainland.

Kimitoön is a bilingual municipality with Finnish and Swedish as its official languages. The population consists of 30% Finnish speakers, 65% Swedish speakers, and 5% speakers of other languages.

== Politics ==
Results of the 2015 Finnish parliamentary election in Kimitoön:

- Swedish People's Party 49.6%
- Social Democratic Party 13.0%
- Left Alliance 9.7%
- True Finns 6.7%
- Centre Party 10.4%
- National Coalition Party 5.4%
- Green League 3.8%
- Christian Democrats 0.8%
- Other parties 0.6%

== Gallery ==
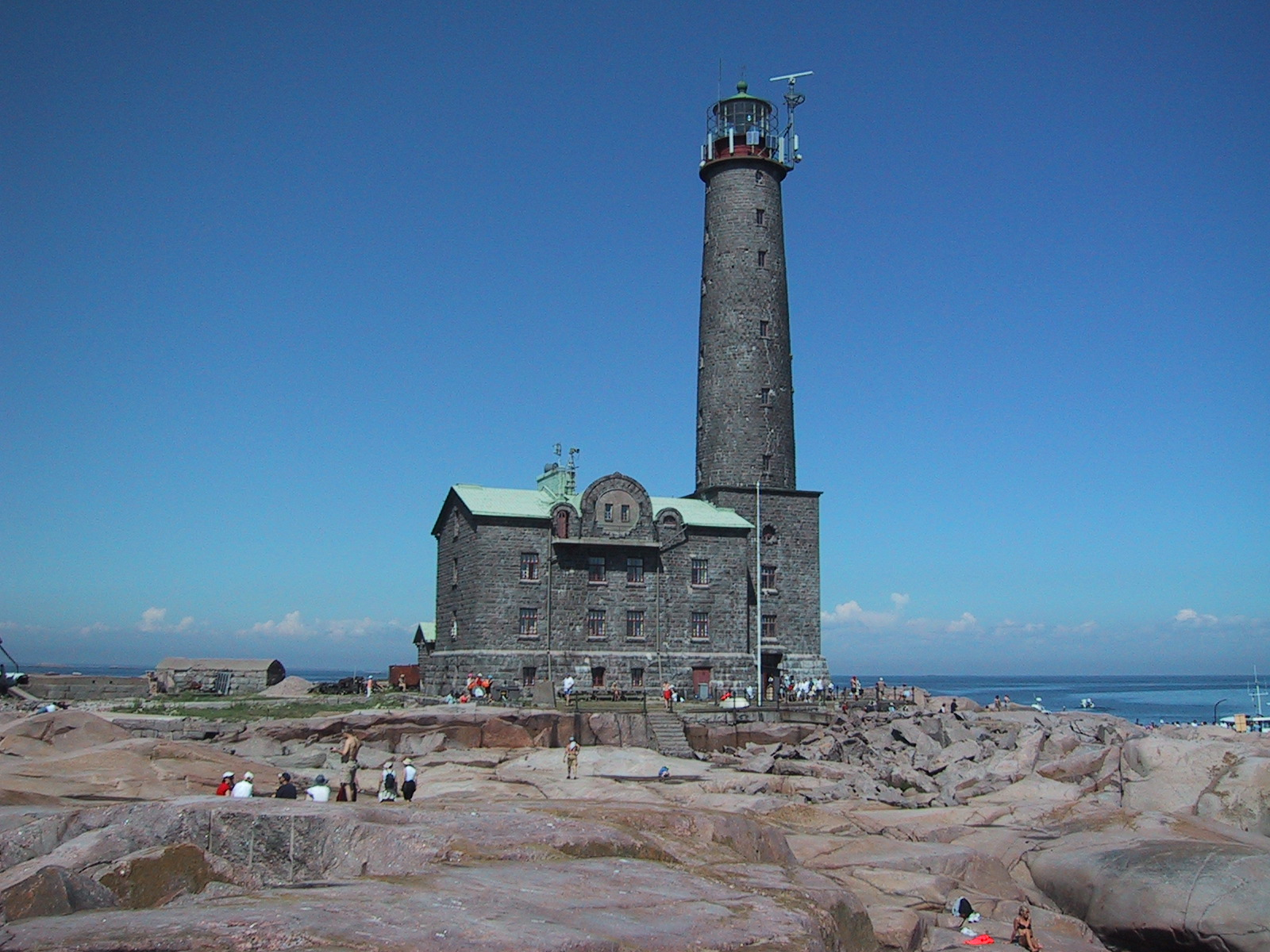
Bengtskär Lighthouse

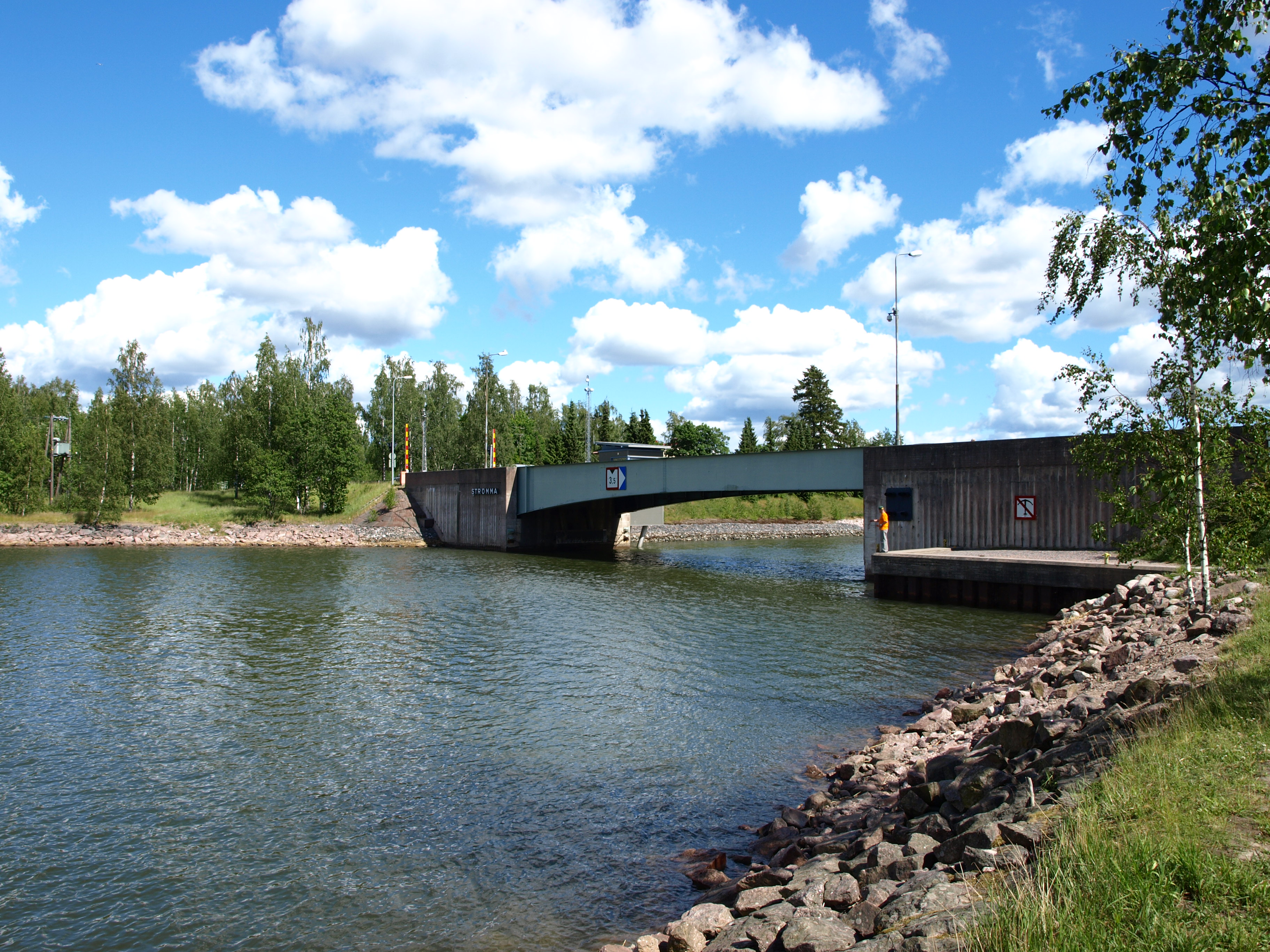
Strömma Canal

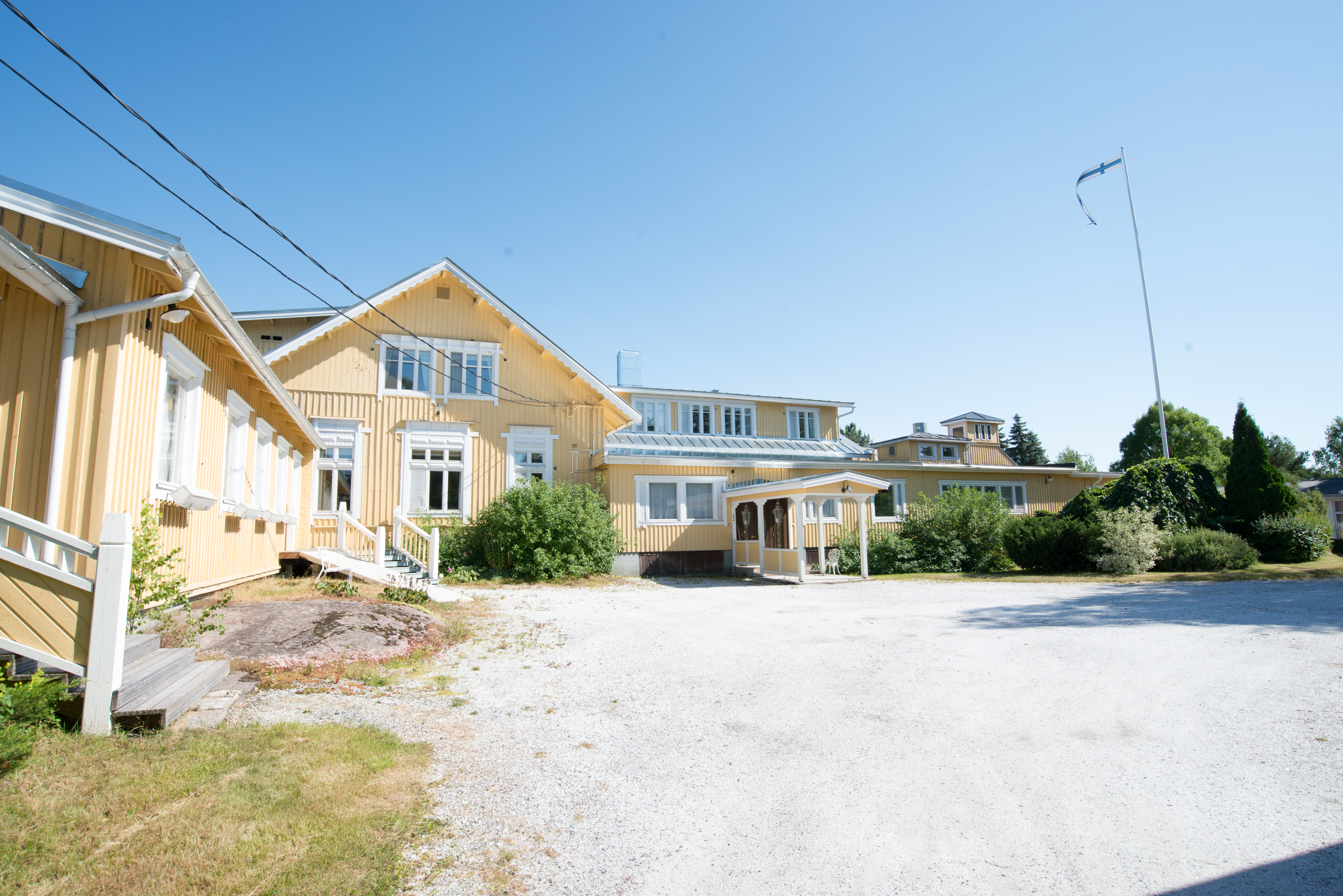
Restaurant Hotel Villa Felix

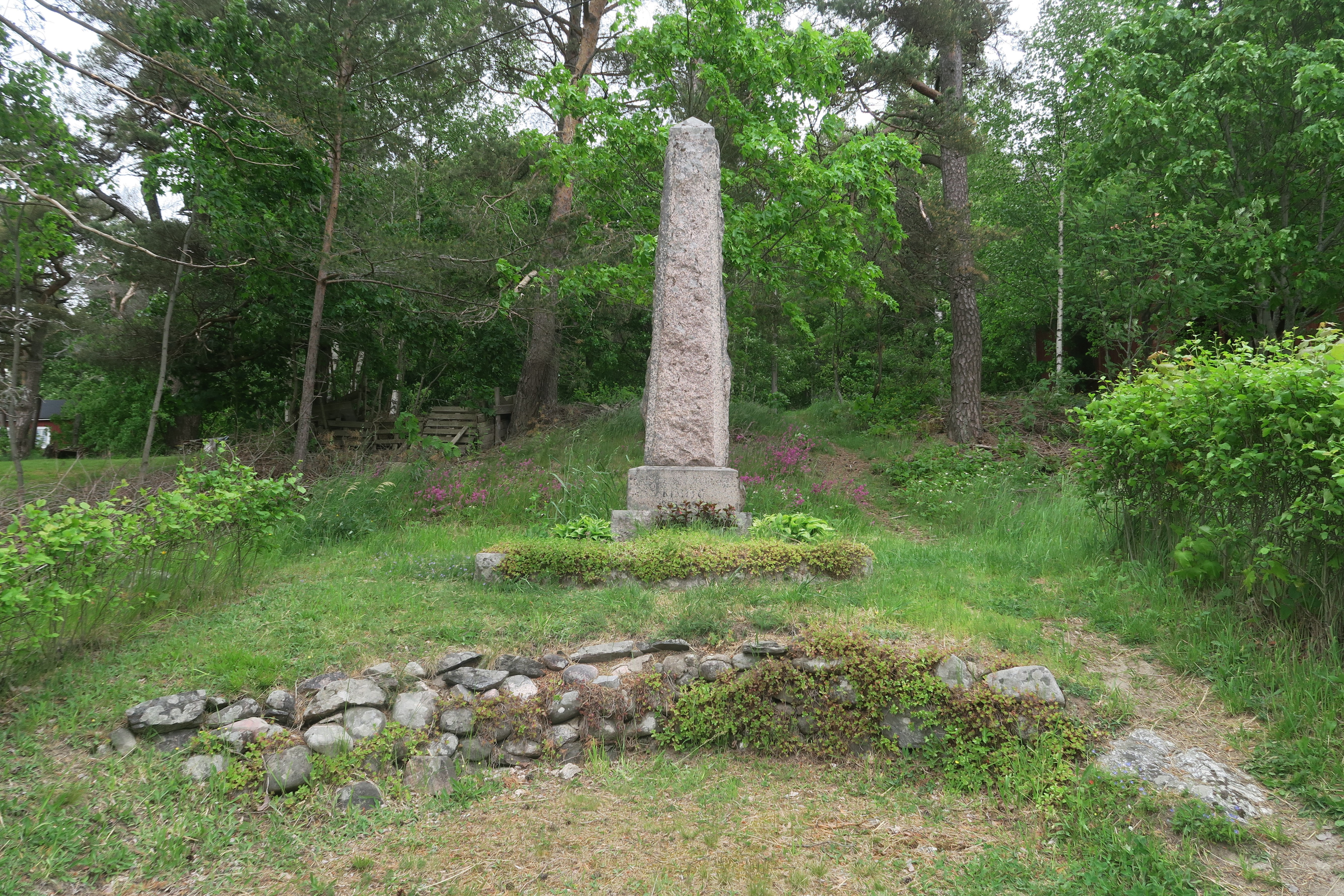
The Obelisk of Kimito Church

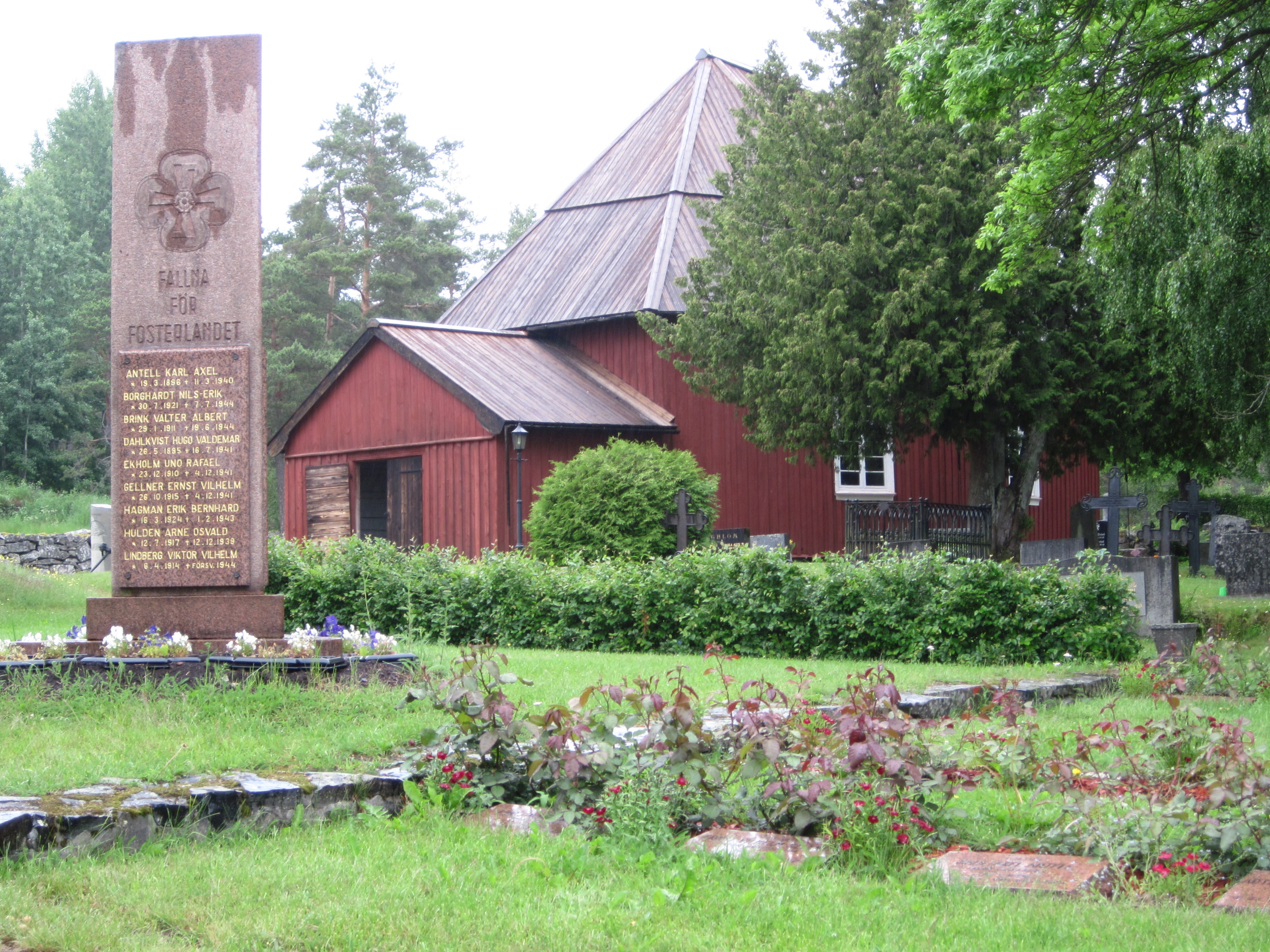
Västanfjärd Old Church

== Climate ==
Kimitoön has a humid continental climate (Köppen: Dfb) with some oceanic influences.

Climate data for Kemiönsaari Kemiö (1991–2020 normals, extremes 1984– present from Kemiö, Lovböle, and Vänö)
Month	Jan	Feb	Mar	Apr	May	Jun	Jul	Aug	Sep	Oct	Nov	Dec	Year
Record high °C (°F)	8.9 (48.0)	9.1 (48.4)	12.8 (55.0)	22.2 (72.0)	29.6 (85.3)	30.9 (87.6)	33.3 (91.9)	31.2 (88.2)	27.5 (81.5)	17.8 (64.0)	14.3 (57.7)	10.2 (50.4)	33.3 (91.9)
Mean daily maximum °C (°F)	−0.6 (30.9)	−1.0 (30.2)	2.6 (36.7)	8.8 (47.8)	15.1 (59.2)	19.2 (66.6)	22.3 (72.1)	21.1 (70.0)	15.8 (60.4)	9.2 (48.6)	4.3 (39.7)	1.5 (34.7)	9.9 (49.8)
Daily mean °C (°F)	−3.3 (26.1)	−4.2 (24.4)	−1.1 (30.0)	4.0 (39.2)	10.0 (50.0)	14.5 (58.1)	17.5 (63.5)	16.2 (61.2)	11.5 (52.7)	6.1 (43.0)	2.1 (35.8)	−0.9 (30.4)	6.0 (42.8)
Mean daily minimum °C (°F)	−6.2 (20.8)	−7.3 (18.9)	−4.9 (23.2)	−0.4 (31.3)	4.3 (39.7)	9.0 (48.2)	12.3 (54.1)	11.4 (52.5)	7.4 (45.3)	3.0 (37.4)	−0.2 (31.6)	−3.5 (25.7)	2.1 (35.8)
Record low °C (°F)	−35.2 (−31.4)	−30.6 (−23.1)	−25.9 (−14.6)	−13.1 (8.4)	−5.5 (22.1)	−0.6 (30.9)	2.9 (37.2)	0.8 (33.4)	−5.2 (22.6)	−13.0 (8.6)	−20.5 (−4.9)	−31.1 (−24.0)	−35.2 (−31.4)
Average precipitation mm (inches)	65 (2.6)	47 (1.9)	45 (1.8)	35 (1.4)	36 (1.4)	58 (2.3)	68 (2.7)	81 (3.2)	67 (2.6)	85 (3.3)	85 (3.3)	85 (3.3)	758 (29.8)
Average precipitation days (≥ 1.0 mm)	12	9	9	8	7	9	8	10	9	12	13	14	120
Source 1: FMI normals 1991-2020
Source 2: Record highs and lows

Climate data for Kemiönsaari Vänö (1991–2020 normals, extremes 1992–present)
Month	Jan	Feb	Mar	Apr	May	Jun	Jul	Aug	Sep	Oct	Nov	Dec	Year
Record high °C (°F)	7.7 (45.9)	6.8 (44.2)	9.9 (49.8)	18.7 (65.7)	25.1 (77.2)	28.8 (83.8)	31.3 (88.3)	29.1 (84.4)	24.3 (75.7)	16.4 (61.5)	13.0 (55.4)	9.6 (49.3)	31.3 (88.3)
Mean daily maximum °C (°F)	0.6 (33.1)	−0.6 (30.9)	1.6 (34.9)	6.3 (43.3)	11.9 (53.4)	16.6 (61.9)	20.4 (68.7)	19.8 (67.6)	15.4 (59.7)	9.8 (49.6)	5.6 (42.1)	2.9 (37.2)	9.2 (48.6)
Daily mean °C (°F)	−1.1 (30.0)	−2.5 (27.5)	−0.6 (30.9)	3.4 (38.1)	8.7 (47.7)	13.6 (56.5)	17.5 (63.5)	17.3 (63.1)	13.3 (55.9)	8.1 (46.6)	4.1 (39.4)	1.3 (34.3)	6.9 (44.4)
Mean daily minimum °C (°F)	−3.2 (26.2)	−4.7 (23.5)	−3.0 (26.6)	1.1 (34.0)	6.0 (42.8)	11.0 (51.8)	15.3 (59.5)	15.1 (59.2)	11.4 (52.5)	6.6 (43.9)	2.5 (36.5)	−0.5 (31.1)	4.8 (40.6)
Record low °C (°F)	−24.8 (−12.6)	−23.5 (−10.3)	−19.1 (−2.4)	−10.5 (13.1)	−1.2 (29.8)	4.3 (39.7)	8.4 (47.1)	7.8 (46.0)	3.5 (38.3)	−3.9 (25.0)	−12.0 (10.4)	−18.5 (−1.3)	−24.8 (−12.6)
Source 1: FMI normals 1991-2020
Source 2: Record highs and lows

== See also ==
- Fasta Åland
- Hailuoto
