= Turku and Pori Province =

Province of Finland (1634–1997)

Coordinates: 60.4517°N 22.2700°E

Turku and Pori Province Turun ja Porin lääni (Finnish) Åbo och Björneborgs län (Swedish) Або-Бьёрнеборгская губерния (Russian)
- County of Sweden 1634–1809; Province of Grand Duchy of Finland 1809–1917; Province of independent Finland 1917–1997
- 1634–1997
- Coat of arms

- Map of Turku and Pori Province (1996)
- Capital: Turku
- Area
  - 1 January 1993: 20,721 km^{2} (8,000 sq mi)
- Population
  - 1 January 1993: 731,786
- History
  - Established: 1634
  - Disestablished: 1997
| Succeeded by |
| Province of Åland; Western Finland Province |

Turku and Pori Province, or Åbo and Björnborg County, (Note: Finnish: Turun ja Porin lääni, Swedish: Åbo och Björneborgs län, Russian: Або-Бьёрнеборгская губерния. In Finnish contexts, lääni or län is usually translated as 'province', while in Swedish contexts, län is usually translated as 'county'.) was an administrative province (Finnish: lääni, Swedish: län) in Finland. It existed as part of the Kingdom of Sweden from 1634 to 1809, the Grand Duchy of Finland under the Russian Empire from 1809 to 1917, and the Republic of Finland from 1917 until the province was abolished in 1997.

The province was first established in the 1634 Instrument of Government as the Province of North and South Finland, with its seat in Turku (Åbo). It was formed by uniting the slottsläns corresponding to Finland Proper, Satakunta and the Åland Islands. In 1641, Satakunta was briefly separated to form Pori Province with the seat in Pori (Björneborg), but the division proved short-lived, and in 1646 the areas were reunited as Turku and Pori Province.

During the 18th century, administrative adjustments reduced the size of the province. In Gustav III's great provincial reform of 1775, most of Upper Satakunta was transferred to the newly established Vaasa Province.

When Finland was annexed by the Russian Empire in 1809 and reorganized as the autonomous Grand Duchy of Finland, the provincial administration remained largely unchanged, and Turku and Pori Province continued under Russian rule. Under Swedish rule, the governor's title had been landshövding, but in 1837 it was changed to guvernör.

In 1918, after Finland’s independence, Åland was separated from the province and made into a distinct autonomous territory, while some municipalities of Satakunta were transferred to Häme Province. Proposals to divide Turku and Pori Province into separate provinces of Finland Proper and Satakunta were considered in the early 1980s but never realized.

In 1997, Turku and Pori Province was merged with the northern part of the Häme Province and with the provinces of Vaasa and Central Finland to form the new Western Finland Province. All Finnish provinces were abolished on 1 January 2010.

== Maps ==
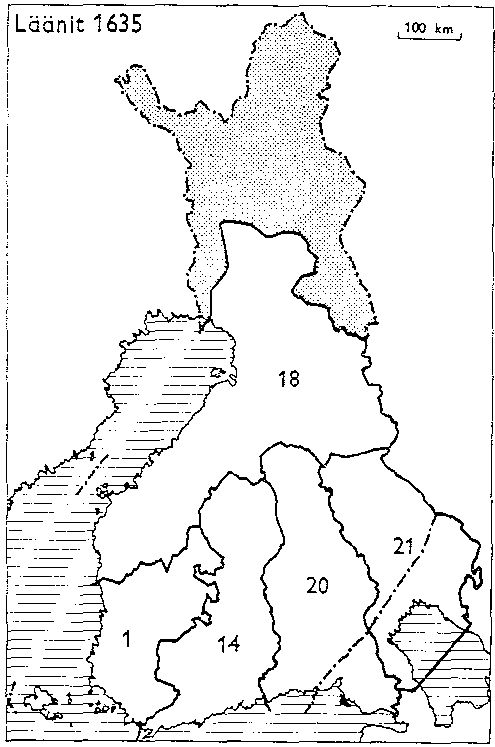
Provinces of Finland 1634: 1: Turku and Pori, 14: Nyland and Tavastehus, 18: Ostrobothnia, 20: Viborg and Nyslott, 21: Kexholm

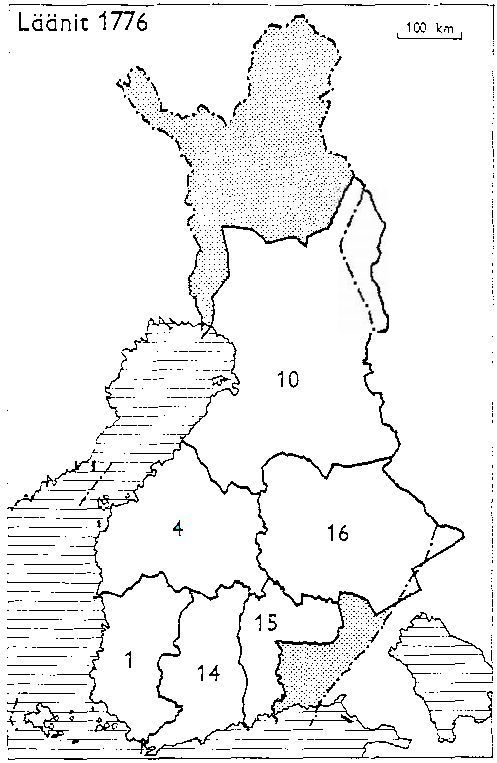
Provinces of Finland 1776: 1: Turku and Pori, 4: Vaasa, 10: Oulu, 14: Nyland and Tavastehus, 15: Kymmenegård, 16: Savolax and Karelia

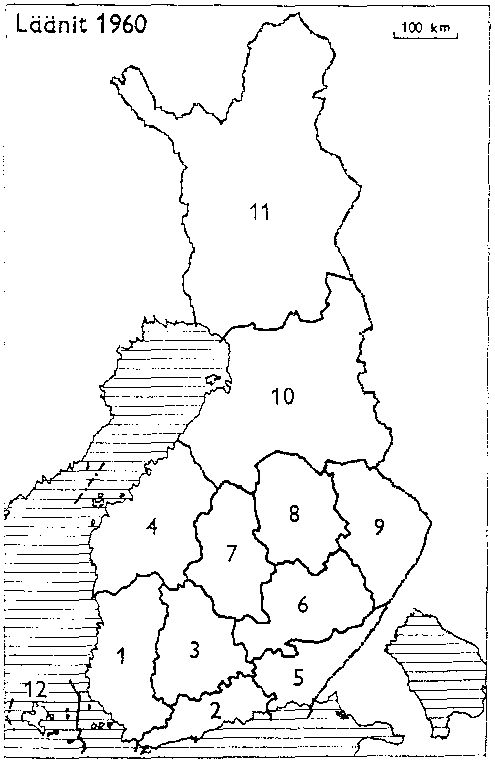
Provinces of Finland 1960: 1: Turku and Pori, 2: Uusimaa, 3: Häme, 4: Vaasa, 5: Kymi, 6: Mikkeli, 7: Central Finland, 8: Kuopio, 9: Northern Karelia, 10: Oulu, 11: Lapland, 12: Åland

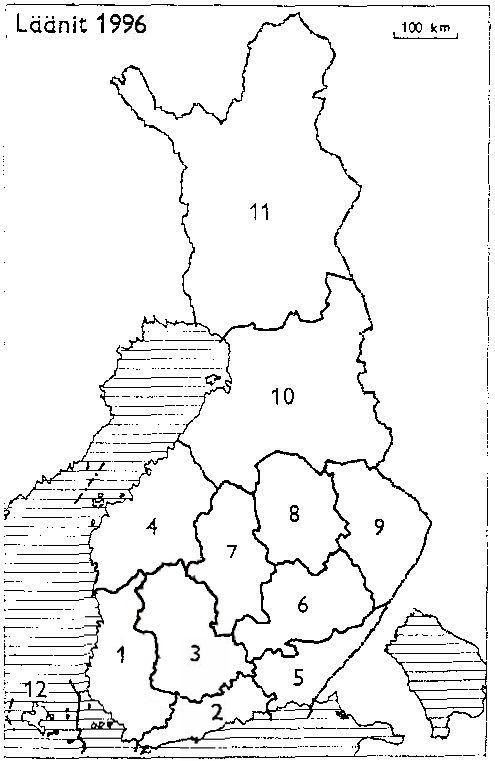
Provinces of Finland 1996: 1: Turku and Pori, 2: Uusimaa, 3: Häme, 4: Vaasa, 5: Kymi, 6: Mikkeli, 7: Central Finland, 8: Kuopio, 9: Northern Karelia, 10: Oulu, 11: Lapland, 12: Åland

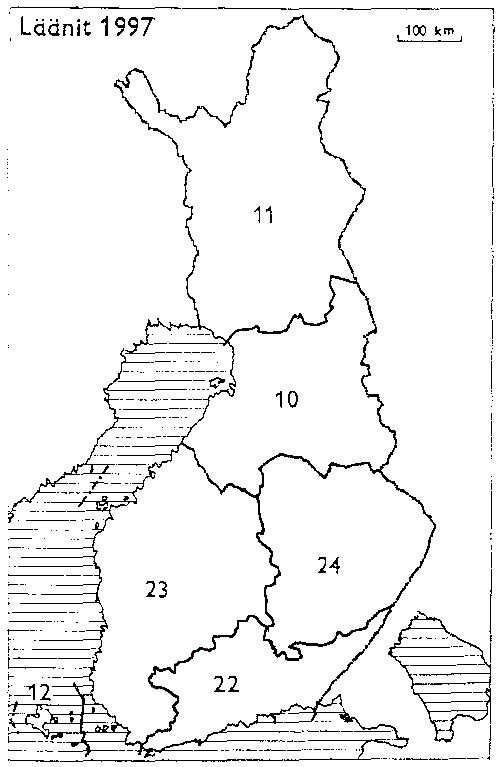
Provinces of Finland 1997: 10: Oulu, 11: Lapland, 12: Åland, 22: Southern Finland, 23: Western Finland, 24: Eastern Finland

== Municipalities in 1997 (cities in bold) ==
- Alastaro
- Askainen
- Aura
- Dragsfjärd
- Eura
- Eurajoki
- Halikko
- **Harjavalta**
- Honkajoki
- Houtskär
- **Huittinen**
- Iniö
- Jämijärvi
- **Kaarina**
- **Kankaanpää**
- Karinainen
- Karvia
- Kimito
- Kiikala
- Kiikoinen
- Kisko
- Kiukainen
- Kodisjoki
- **Kokemäki**
- Korpo
- Koski Tl
- Kullaa
- Kustavi
- Kuusjoki
- Köyliö
- **Laitila**
- Lappi
- Lavia
- Lemu
- Lieto
- **Loimaa**
- Loimaan kunta
- Luvia
- Marttila
- Masku
- Mellilä
- Merikarvia
- Merimasku
- Mietoinen
- Muurla
- Mynämäki
- **Naantali**
- Nakkila
- Nagu
- Noormarkku
- Nousiainen
- Oripää
- **Pargas**
- Paimio
- Perniö
- Pertteli
- Piikkiö
- Pomarkku
- **Pori**
- Punkalaidun
- Pyhäranta
- Pöytyä
- **Raisio**
- **Rauma**
- Rusko
- Rymättylä
- **Salo**
- Sauvo
- Siikainen
- **Somero**
- Suodenniemi
- Suomusjärvi
- Säkylä
- Särkisalo
- Taivassalo
- Tarvasjoki
- **Turku**
- Ulvila
- **Uusikaupunki**
- Vahto
- **Vammala**
- Vampula
- Vehmaa
- Velkua
- Västanfjärd
- Yläne
- Äetsä

== Former municipalities (disestablished before 1997) ==
- Ahlainen
- Angelniemi
- Hinnerjoki
- Hitis
- Honkilahti
- Kakskerta
- Kalanti
- Karjala
- Karkku
- Karuna
- Kauvatsa
- Keikyä
- Kiikka
- Kuusisto
- Lokalahti
- Maaria
- Metsämaa
- Naantalin mlk
- Paattinen
- Paraisten mlk
- Porin mlk
- Pyhämaa
- Rauman mlk
- Suoniemi
- Tyrvää
- Uskela
- Uudenkaupungin mlk

== Governors ==
=== Swedish realm ===
==== North and South Finland Province, including Åland ====
- Broder Andersson Rålamb 1634–1637
- Melchior von Falkenberg 1637–1641

==== Turku Province, including Åland ====
- Melchior von Falkenberg 1641–1642
- Knut Lilliehöök 1642–1646

==== Pori Province ====
- Two governors were appointed, but neither assumed the post.

==== Turku and Pori Province, including Åland ====
- Knut Lilliehöök 1647–1648
- Lorentz Creutz the Elder 1649–1655
- Erik von der Linde 1655–1666
- Ernest Johann Creutz 1666
- Harald Oxe 1666–1682
- Lorenz Creutz the Younger 1682–1698
- Jakob Bure 1698–1706
- Justus von Palmberg 1706–1714
- Johan Stiernstedt 1714–1722 (acting 1711–1713)
- Otto Reinhold Yxkull 1722–1746
- Lars Johan Ehrenmalm 1747–1749 (acting 1744–1747)
- Johan Georg Lillienberg 1749–1757
- Jeremias Wallén 1757–1769
- Christoffer Johan Rappe 1769–1776
- Fredrik Ulrik von Rosen 1776–1781
- Magnus Wilhelm Armfelt 1782–1790
- Joakim von Glan (acting 1789–1790)
- Ernst Gustaf von Willebrand 1790–1806
- Olof Wibelius (acting 1801–1802)
- Knut von Troil 1806–1809
- Otto Reinhold Meurman (acting governor over Åland 1808–1809)

=== Grand Duchy of Finland ===
==== Turku and Pori Province, including Åland ====
- Knut von Troil 1809–1816
- Otto Herman Lode (acting 1811–1813)
- Carl Erik Mannerheim 1816–1826
- Lars Gabriel von Haartman (acting 1820–1822)
- Eric Wallenius 1826–1828 (acting 1822–1826)
- Adolf Broberg 1828–1831
- Lars Gabriel von Haartman 1831–1842 (acting 1820–1822)
- Gabriel Anton Cronstedt 1842–1856 (acting 1840–1842)
- Samuel Werner von Troil (acting 1856)
- Carl Fabian Langenskiöld 1856–1858
- Selim Mohamed Ekbom (acting 1857–1858)
- Johan Axel Cedercreutz 1863 (acting 1858–1863)
- Carl Magnus Creutz 1866–1889 (acting 1864–1866)
- Axel Gustaf Samuel von Troil 1889–1891
- Wilhelm Theodor von Kraemer 1891–1903
- Theodor Hjalmar Lang 1903–1905
- Knut Gustaf Nikolai Borgenström 1905–1911
- Eliel Ilmari Wuorinen 1911–1917

=== Independent Finland ===
==== Turku and Pori Province ====
- Albert Alexander von Hellens (acting 1917)
- Kaarlo Collan 1918–1922 (acting 1917–1918)
- Ilmari Helenius 1922–1932
- Wilho Kyttä 1932–1949
- Erkki Härmä 1949–1957
- Esko Kulovaara 1957–1971
- Sylvi Siltanen 1972–1977
- Paavo Aitio 1977–1985
- Pirkko Työläjärvi 1985–1997

== Sources ==
- Lääninhallinto 350 vuotta / Länsförvaltningen 350 år (in Finnish and Swedish). Helsinki: Sisäasiainministeriö / Inrikesministeriet. 1986. ISBN 951-46-8896-1.
- Tiihonen, Seppo (1984). Suomen hallintohistoria (in Finnish). Helsinki: Valtion Painatuskeskus. ISBN 951-9314-32-6.
- Haapala, Pertti; Toivo, Raisa Maria (2007). Suomen historian kartasto (in Finnish). Helsinki: Karttakeskus. ISBN 978-951-593-029-3.
