= Regions of Western Finland =

The former Province of Western Finland in Finland was divided into seven regions, 34 districts and 192 municipalities.

== Regions ==
- Southern Ostrobothnia (Etelä-Pohjanmaa/ Södra Österbotten)
- Ostrobothnia (Österbotten/ Pohjanmaa)
- Pirkanmaa (Pirkanmaa/ Birkaland)
- Satakunta (Satakunta/ Satakunta)
- Central Ostrobothnia (Keski-Pohjanmaa/ Mellersta Österbotten)
- Central Finland (Keski-Suomi/ Mellersta Finland)
- Southwest Finland (Varsinais-Suomi/ Egentliga Finland)

== Southern Ostrobothnia ==
- South-Eastern Bothnia
  - Isojoki (Storå)
  - Jurva
  - Karijoki (Bötom)
  - Kauhajoki
  - Teuva (Östermark)
- Northern Seinänaapurit District
  - Ilmajoki (Ilmola)
  - Nurmo
  - Seinäjoki
  - Ylistaro
- Southern Seinänaapurit District
  - Jalasjärvi
  - Kurikka
  - Peräseinäjoki
- Kuusiokunnat District
  - Alavus (Alavo)
  - Kuortane
  - Lehtimäki
  - Soini
  - Töysä
  - Ähtäri (Etseri)
- Härmänmaa District
  - Alahärmä
  - Kauhava
  - Lapua (Lappo)
  - Ylihärmä
- Järviseutu District
  - Alajärvi
  - Evijärvi
  - Kortesjärvi
  - Lappajärvi
  - Vimpeli (Vindala)

== Ostrobothnia Region ==
- Kyrönmaa District
  - Isokyrö (Storkyro)
  - Laihia (Laihela)
  - Vähäkyrö (Lillkyro)
- Vaasa District
  - Korsnäs
  - Malax (Maalahti)
  - Korsholm (Mustasaari)
  - Oravais (Oravainen)
  - Vaasa (Vasa)
  - Vörå-Maxmo (Vöyri-Maksamaa)
- South-Eastern Bothnia Coastal District
  - Kaskinen (Kaskö)
  - Kristinestad (Kristiinankaupunki)
  - Närpes (Närpiö)
- Jakobstad District
  - Kronoby (Kruunupyy)
  - Larsmo (Luoto)
  - Jakobstad (Pietarsaari)
  - Pedersöre (Pedersören kunta)
  - Nykarleby (Uusikaarlepyy)

== Pirkanmaa Region ==
- North Western Pirkanmaa
  - Hämeenkyrö (Tavastkyro)
  - Ikaalinen (Ikalis)
  - Kihniö
  - Parkano
- South-Eastern Pirkanmaa
  - Kuhmalahti
  - Pälkäne
- Southern Pirkanmaa
  - Akaa (Ackas)
  - Kylmäkoski
  - Urjala
  - Valkeakoski
- Tampere District
  - Kangasala
  - Lempäälä
  - Nokia
  - Pirkkala (Birkala)
  - Tampere (Tammerfors)
  - Vesilahti
  - Ylöjärvi
- South-Western Pirkanmaa
  - Mouhijärvi
  - Punkalaidun
  - Vammala
  - Äetsä
- Upper Pirkanmaa
  - Juupajoki
  - Kuru
  - Mänttä
  - Orivesi
  - Ruovesi
  - Vilppula
  - Virrat (Virdois)

== Satakunta Region ==
- Rauma District
  - Eura
  - Eurajoki (Euraåminne)
  - Kiukainen (Kiukais)
  - Lappi
  - Rauma (Raumo)
- South-Eastern Satakunta
  - Huittinen (Vittis)
  - Kokemäki (Kumo)
  - Köyliö (Kjulo)
  - Säkylä
  - Vampula
- Pori District
  - Harjavalta
  - Luvia
  - Nakkila
  - Noormarkku (Norrmark)
  - Pomarkku (Påmark)
  - Pori (Björneborg)
  - Ulvila (Ulvsby)
- Northern Satakunta
  - Honkajoki
  - Jämijärvi
  - Kankaanpää
  - Karvia
  - Kiikoinen
  - Lavia
  - Merikarvia (Sastmola)
  - Siikainen (Siikais)

== Central Ostrobothnia Region ==
- Kaustinen District
  - Halsua (Halso)
  - Kaustinen (Kaustby)
  - Lestijärvi
  - Perho
  - Toholampi
  - Ullava
  - Veteli (Vetil)
- Kokkola District
  - Himanka (Himango)
  - Kannus
  - Kokkola (Karleby)
  - Kälviä (Kelviå)
  - Lohtaja (Lochteå)

== Central Finland Region ==
- Jyväskylä District
  - Jyväskylä
  - Jyväskylän maalaiskunta (Jyväskylä landskommun)
  - Laukaa (Laukas)
  - Muurame
  - Uurainen
- South-Eastern Middle Finland
  - Hankasalmi
  - Joutsa
  - Leivonmäki
  - Luhanka
  - Toivakka
- Keuruu District
  - Keuruu (Keuru)
  - Multia
  - Petäjävesi
- Jämsä District
  - Jämsä
  - Jämsänkoski
  - Korpilahti
  - Kuhmoinen (Kuhmois)
- Äänekoski District
  - Konnevesi
  - Äänekoski
- Saarijärvi District
  - Kannonkoski
  - Karstula
  - Kivijärvi
  - Kyyjärvi
  - Pylkönmäki
  - Saarijärvi
- Viitasaari District
  - Kinnula
  - Pihtipudas
  - Viitasaari

== Southwest Finland Region ==
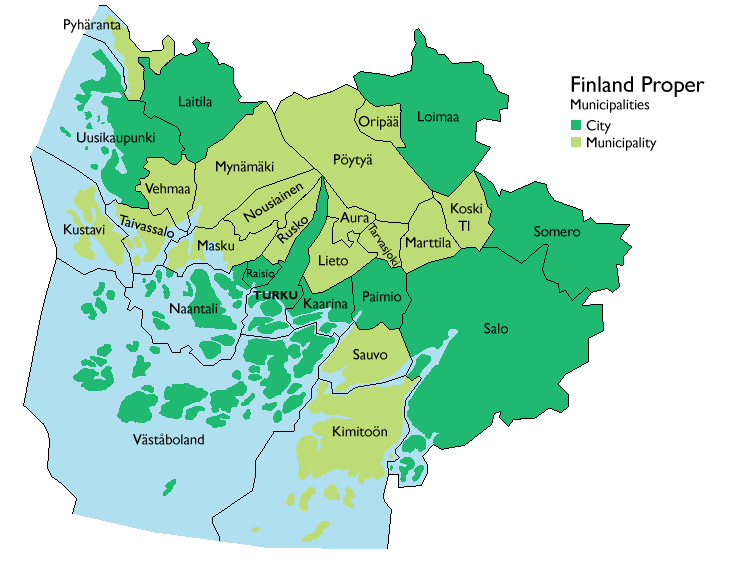

- Åboland-Turunmaa
  - Dragsfjärd
  - Houtskär (Houtskari)
  - Iniö
  - Kimito (Kemiö)
  - Korpo (Korppoo)
  - Nagu (Nauvo)
  - Pargas (Parainen)
  - Västanfjärd
- Salo District
  - Halikko
  - Kiikala
  - Kisko
  - Kuusjoki
  - Muurla
  - Perniö (Bjärnå)
  - Pertteli (S:t Bertils)
  - Salo
  - Somero
  - Suomusjärvi
  - Särkisalo (Finby)
- Turku District
  - Askainen (Villnäs)
  - Kaarina (S:t Karins)
  - Lemu (Lemo)
  - Lieto (Lundo)
  - Masku
  - Merimasku
  - Naantali (Nådendal)
  - Nousiainen (Nousis)
  - Paimio (Pemar)
  - Piikkiö (Pikis)
  - Raisio (Reso)
  - Rusko
  - Rymättylä (Rimito)
  - Sauvo (Sagu)
  - Turku (Åbo)
  - Vahto
  - Velkua
- Vakka-Suomi
  - Kustavi (Gustavs)
  - Laitila (Letala)
  - Mietoinen (Mietois)
  - Mynämäki (Virmo)
  - Pyhäranta
  - Taivassalo (Tövsala)
  - Uusikaupunki (Nystad)
  - Vehmaa (Vemo)
- Loimaa District
  - Alastaro
  - Aura
  - Koski Tl (Koskis)
  - Loimaa
  - Marttila (S:t Mårtens)
  - Mellilä
  - Oripää
  - Pöytyä
  - Tarvasjoki
  - Yläne

== See also ==
- Municipalities of Southern Ostrobothnia
- Municipalities of Ostrobothnia
- Municipalities of Pirkanmaa
- Municipalities of Satakunta
- Municipalities of Central Ostrobothnia
- Municipalities of Central Finland
- Municipalities of Finland Proper
