= Oulu Province =

Province of Finland (1775–2009)

Coordinates: 64°30′N 27°00′E

Province of Oulu Oulun lääni Uleåborgs län
- County of Sweden 1775–1809; Province of Grand Duchy of Finland 1809–1917; Province of independent Finland 1917–2009
- 1775–2009
- Coat of arms

- Province of Oulu (in red)
- Capital: Oulu
- Area
  - 1 January 1993: 61,582 km^{2} (23,777 sq mi)
  - 31 December 2009: 61,582 km^{2} (23,777 sq mi)
- Population
  - 1 January 1993: 445,706
  - 31 December 2009: 471,774
- History
  - Established: 1775
  - Disestablished: 2009
Preceded by
County of Ostrobothnia

Oulu Province (Finnish: Oulun lääni, Swedish: Uleåborgs län, Russian: Губерния О́улу) was a province of Finland from 1775 to 2009. It bordered the provinces of Lapland, Western Finland and Eastern Finland and also the Gulf of Bothnia and Russia.

== History ==
The Province of Oulu was established in 1775 when Finland was an integrated part of Sweden from the northern part of Ostrobothnia County. The new province was named after its administrative seat of Oulu.

As a consequence of the tumultuous conflicts of the Napoleonic Wars, Sweden had allied itself with the Russian Empire, United Kingdom and the other parties of the Fourth Coalition against Napoleonic France. However, following the treaty of Treaty of Tilsit in 1807, Russia made peace with France and left the coalition. This enabled Russia in 1808 to challenge Sweden in the Finnish War, over the control of Finland. In the Treaty of Fredrikshamn on 17 September 1809 Sweden was obliged to cede all its territory in Finland, to Russia.

The ceded territories became a part of the Russian Empire and were reconstituted into the Grand Duchy of Finland, with the Russian Tsar as Grand Duke. The Province of Oulu was expanded in 1809 with the parts of the Västerbotten County (eastern part of the Torne Valley and historical Lapland).

After Finland became independent from Russia, in 1917, there were no changes in Oulu Province until 1938, when the northern part was split off and established as the Lapland Province.

All the provinces of Finland were abolished on 1 January 2010.

Provinces of Finland 1634: 1: Turku and Pori, 14: Nyland and Tavastehus, 18: Ostrobothnia, 20: Viborg and Nyslott, 21: Kexholm	Provinces of Finland 1776: 1: Turku and Pori, 4: Vaasa, 10: Oulu, 14: Uusimaa and Häme, 15: Kymenkartano, 16: Savo and Karelia	Provinces of Finland 1938: 1: Turku and Pori, 2: Uusimaa, 3: Häme, 4: Vaasa, 6: Mikkeli, 8: Kuopio, 10: Oulu, 11: Lapland, 12: Åland, 13: Viipuri	Provinces of Finland 1996: 1: Turku and Pori, 2: Uusimaa, 3: Häme, 4: Vaasa, 5: Kymi, 6: Mikkeli, 7: Central Finland, 8: Kuopio, 9: Northern Karelia, 10: Oulu, 11: Lapland, 12: Åland	Provinces of Finland 1997: 10: Oulu, 11: Lapland, 12: Åland, 22: Southern Finland, 23: Western Finland, 24: Eastern Finland

Map of Oulu County from 1795.

== Administration ==
The State Provincial Office was a joint regional authority of seven different ministries. It promoted national and regional objectives of the State central administration.

== Subdivisions ==
At the time of its abolition, Oulu Province was composed of two regions:

- Northern Ostrobothnia (Pohjois-Pohjanmaa / Norra Österbotten)
- Kainuu (Kainuu / Kajanaland).

These regions were further divided into a total of 9 subregions and 43 municipalities. In the list below, the municipalities that designate themselves as cities or towns (Finnish: kaupunki, Swedish: stad) are shown in bold.

=== North Ostrobothnia ===
==== Oulu sub-region ====
- Hailuoto (Karlö)
- Haukipudas
- Kempele
- Kiiminki (Kiminge)
- Liminka (Limingo)
- Lumijoki
- Muhos
- **Oulu** (Uleåborg)
- Oulunsalo
- Tyrnävä

==== Oulunkaari sub-region ====
- Ii (Ijo)
- **Pudasjärvi**
- Utajärvi
- Yli-Ii

==== Raahe sub-region ====
- Pyhäjoki
- **Raahe** (Brahestad)
- Siikajoki
- Vihanti

==== Siikalatva sub-region ====
- **Haapavesi**
- Pyhäntä
- Siikalatva

==== Nivala–Haapajärvi sub-region ====
- **Haapajärvi**
- Kärsämäki
- **Nivala**
- **Pyhäjärvi**
- Reisjärvi

==== Ylivieska sub-region ====
- Alavieska
- **Kalajoki**
- Merijärvi
- **Oulainen**
- Sievi
- **Ylivieska**

==== Koillismaa sub-region ====
- **Kuusamo**
- Taivalkoski

=== Kainuu ===
==== Kehys-Kainuu sub-region ====
- Hyrynsalmi
- **Kuhmo**
- Puolanka
- Suomussalmi

==== Kajaani sub-region ====
- **Kajaani** (Kajana)
- Paltamo
- Ristijärvi
- Sotkamo
- Vaala

== Former municipalities (disestablished before 2009) ==
- Kajaanin mlk
- Oulujoki
- Paavola
- Rautio
- Revonlahti
- Saloinen
- Kestilä
- Kuivaniemi
- Pattijoki
- Piippola
- Pulkkila
- Rantsila
- Ruukki
- Temmes
- Vuolijoki
- Ylikiiminki

== Governors ==
- Carl Magnus Jägerhorn 1775–1782
- Adolf Tandefelt 1782–1785
- Johan Fredrik Carpelan 1785–1800
- Samuel af Forselles 1800–1802
- Adolf Edelsvärd 1802–1804
- Jakob Daniel Lange 1805–1808
- Carl Henrik Ehrenstolpe 1809–1820
- Samuel Fredrik von Born 1820–1826
- Johan Abraham Stjernschantz 1826–1834
- Robert Wilhelm Lagerborg 1834–1849
- Alexander Lavonius 1849–1862
- George von Alfthan 1862–1873
- Otto Nyberg 1873–1879
- Carl Johan Jägerhorn 1878–1883
- Carl Adolf Tamelander 1883–1884
- Johan Gabriel Masalin 1884–1886
- Johan Axel Gripenberg 1886–1889
- Anders Johan Malmgren 1889–1897
- Gustaf Esaias Fellman 1897–1901
- Edvard Furuhjelm 1901–1903
- Otto Savander 1903–1905
- Guido Gadolin 1905–1911
- Hjalmar Langinkoski 1911–1915
- Axel Fabian af Enehjelm 1915–1917
- Matts von Nandelstadh 1917–1925
- Eero Pehkonen 1925–1948
- Kaarle Määttä 1949–1967
- Niilo Ryhtä 1967–1973
- Erkki Haukipuro 1973–1986
- Ahti Pekkala 1986–1991
- Eino Siuruainen 1991–2009
