= Mikael Toppelius =

Finnish painter

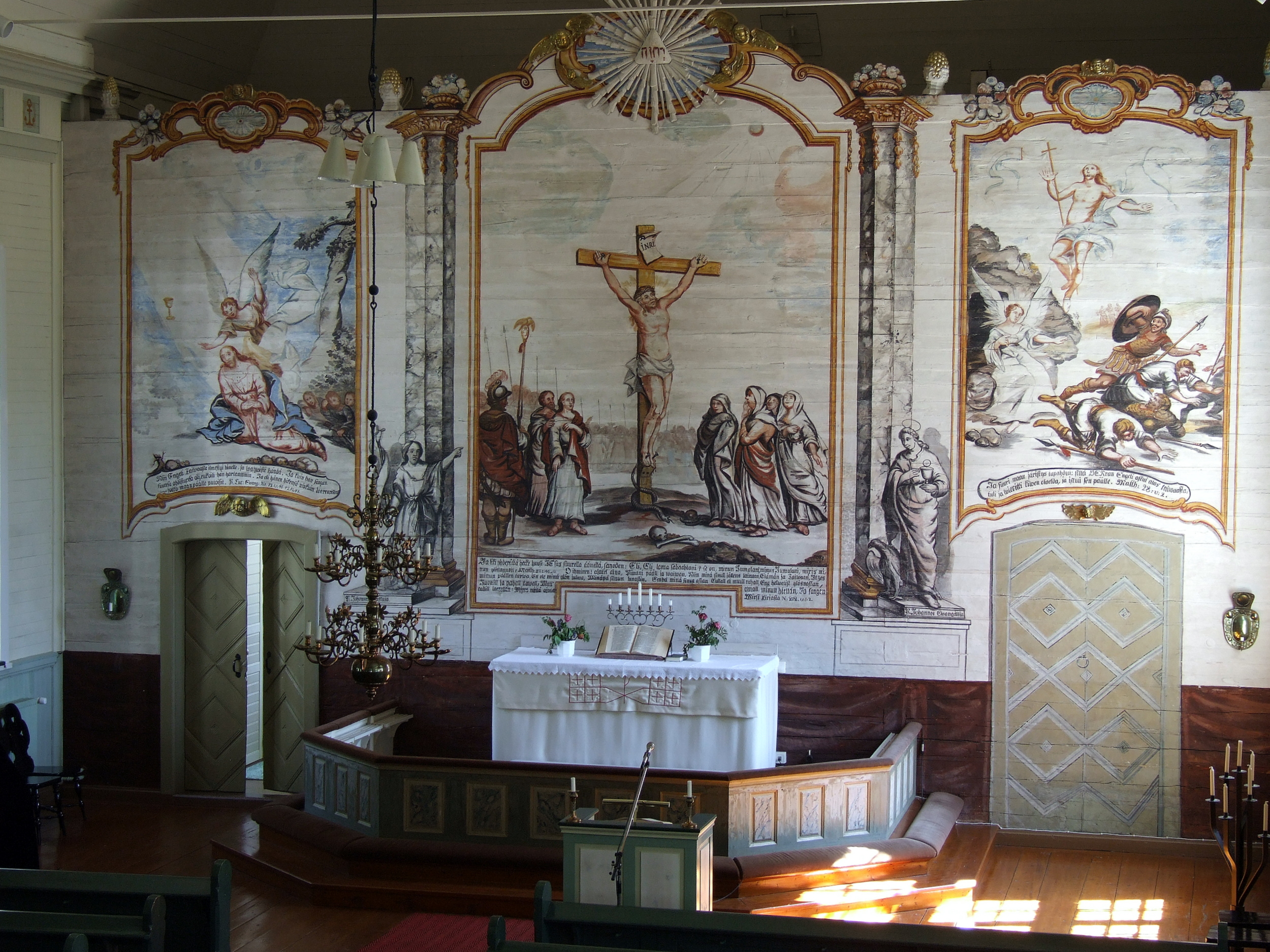
The Altarpiece at Rantsila Church.

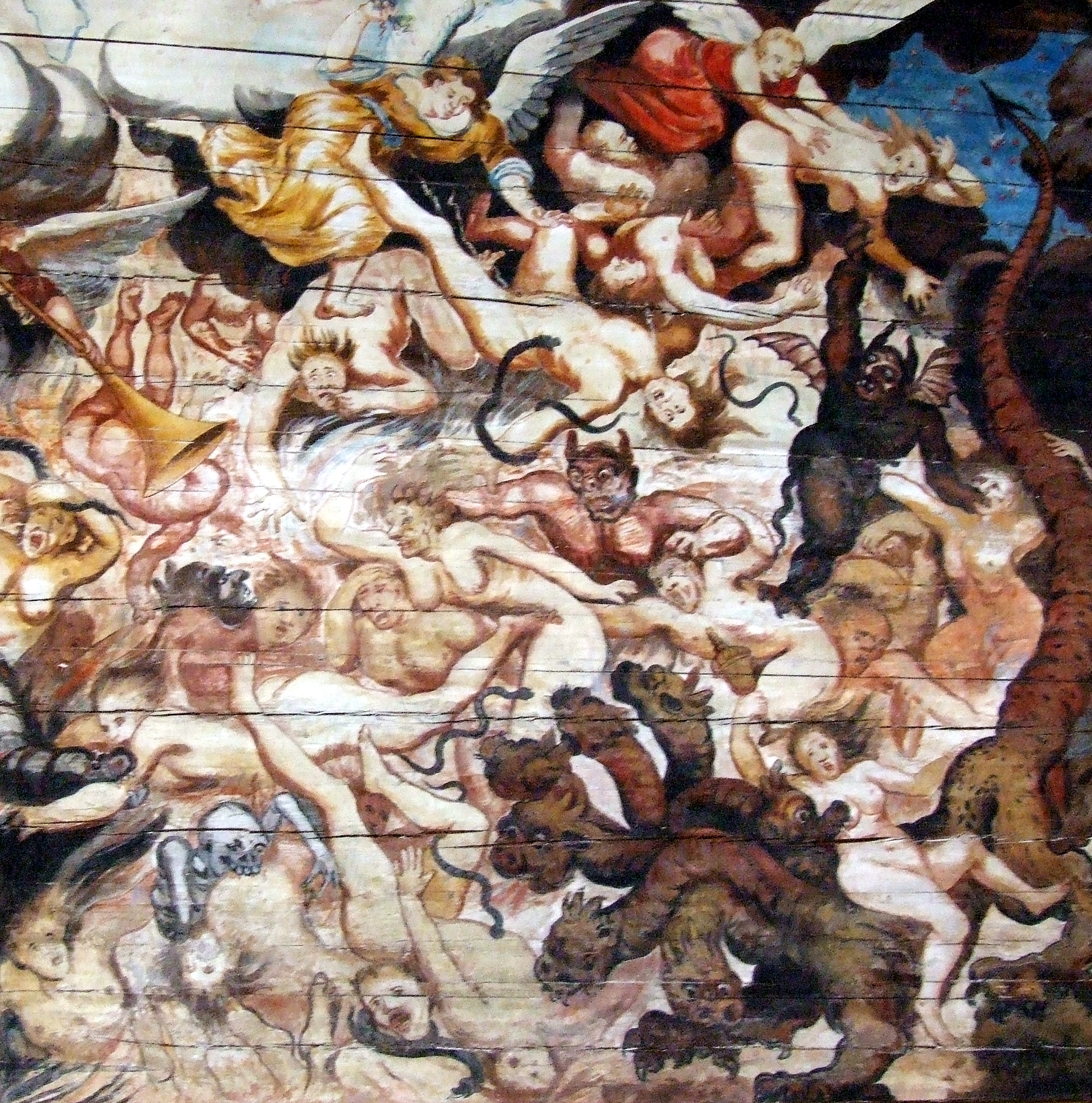
The Day of Judgment (detail), from Haukipudas Church.

Mikael Toppelius (10 August 1734, Oulu – 27 December 1821, Oulu) was a Finnish church painter; the last significant representative of the Ostrobothnian church painting tradition. His grandson was the well-known writer, Zachris Topelius.

== Biography ==
The family's original surname was "Toppila", but his grandfather had Latinized it when he began a civil service career. His mother was from a family with a long line of clergymen. His father was a clerk for the local customs office and an amateur painter, who inspired Mikael's interest in art and gave him his first lessons.

He was only fourteen when his received his first employment from a local priest who had become interested in his career. This involved painting figures at the Gustav Adolf Church in Iisalmi. As it turned out, the priest's brother was the Royal Librarian so, in 1751, Toppelius went to Stockholm with a letter of recommendation to Johan Pasch, the court painter. He remained there as an apprentice for two years, doing decorative work at the castle for the new King, Adolf Frederick.

He returned to Oulu in 1753, and three years later, was given his first job as a professional artist, decorating the old church in Hailuoto, which burned down in 1968. His church painting career eventually lasted almost seven decades. Most of his work was done within Ostrobothnia and Northern Savonia.

His best-known works are probably those depicting Biblical events in Haukipudas Church, created from 1774 to 1777, which includes his largest painting; a Day of Judgment which measures eight meters wide by four meters high (roughly 26 x 13 feet). From 1786 to 1795, he created similar scenes for the church in Kempele. Other notable works are in the churches of Lohtaja, Siikajoki and Rantsila.

His last project was in Revonlahti, near Paavola, in 1821, the year he died. Overall, he decorated approximately 30 churches. Four of them have been destroyed by fire. Ten were demolished but whenever possible, his work was transferred to the new church or donated to a museum. Three (in Piippola, Ilmajoki and Tohmajärvi) still exist in their original form.
