= List of former municipalities of Finland =

This is a list of the former municipalities of Finland.

Contents: A B C D E F G H I J K L M N O P Q R S T U V W X Y Z Ä Ö

== A ==
- Ahlainen (Swedish: Vittisbofjärd) – became part of Pori in 1972
- Aitolahti (Swedish: Aitolax) – became part of Tampere in 1966
- Akaa (Swedish: Ackas) – divided in 1946 between Toijala, Kylmäkoski, Sääksmäki and Viiala. The name was re-introduced in 2007 when the municipalities of Toijala and Viiala were consolidated.
- Alahärmä – consolidated with Kauhava in 2009
- Alastaro – consolidated with Loimaa in 2009
- Alatornio (Swedish: Nedertorneå) – became part of Tornio in 1973
- Alaveteli (Swedish: Nedervetil) – consolidated with Kronoby in 1969
- Angelniemi – became part of Halikko in 1967
- Anjala – consolidated with Sippola in 1975 to form the Anjalankoski market town
- Antrea (Swedish: S:t Andree) – was lost to the USSR in 1944
- Anttola – became part of Mikkeli in 2001
- Artjärvi (Swedish: Artsjö) – consolidated with Orimattila in 2011
- Askainen (Swedish: Villnäs) – consolidated with Masku in 2009

== B ==
- Bergö – became part of Malax in 1975
- Björköby – became part of Korsholm in 1973
- Bromarv – consolidated mostly with Tenala (southern part with Hanko) in 1977

== D ==
- Degerby – consolidated with Ingå (fi. Inkoo) in 1946
- Dragsfjärd – consolidated with Kimito and Västanfjärd to form Kimitoön in 2009

== E ==
- Ekenäs (Finnish: Tammisaari) – consolidated with Karis and Pohja (Swedish: Pojo) to form Raseborg in 2009
- Ekenäs landskommun (Finnish: Tammisaaren maalaiskunta) – consolidated with Ekenäs in 1977
- Elimäki (Swedish: Elimä) – consolidated with Kouvola in 2009
- Eno – consolidated with Joensuu in 2009
- Eräjärvi – became part of Orivesi in 1973
- Esse (Finnish: Ähtävä) – became part of Pedersöre in 1977
- Etelä-Pirkkala (Swedish: Södra Birkkala) – name of Pirkkala (Swedish: Birkala) in 1922–1938

== H ==
- Haaga (Swedish: Haga) – became part of Helsinki (Swedish: Helsingfors) in 1946
- Haapasaari – became part of Kotka in 1974
- Halikko – consolidated with Salo in 2009
- Harlu – was lost to the USSR in 1944
- Hauho – consolidated with Hämeenlinna (Swedish: Tavastehus) in 2009
- Haukivuori – became part of City of Mikkeli (Swedish: S:t Michel) in 2007
- Heinjoki – was lost to the USSR in 1944
- Heinolan maalaiskunta (Swedish: Heinola landskommun) and Heinola were consolidated as Heinola in 1997
- Helsingin maalaiskunta (Swedish: Helsinge landskommun) – renamed as Vantaa (Swedish: Vanda) in 1972, parts of the municipality had been annexed to Helsinki in 1946 with the exception of Vuosaari (Swedish: Nordsjö), which was annexed in 1966
- Himanka (Swedish: Himango) – consolidated with Kalajoki in 2010
- Hiitola – was lost to the USSR in 1944
- Hinnerjoki – became part of Eura in 1970
- Honkajoki – consolidated with Kankaanpää in 2021
- Honkilahti (Swedish: Honkilax) – became part of Eura in 1970
- Houtskär (Finnish: Houtskari) – consolidated with Iniö, Korpo, Nagu and Pargas to form Väståboland
- Huopalahti (Swedish: Hoplax) – became part of Helsinki (Swedish: Helsingfors) in 1946
- Hyvinkään maalaiskunta (Swedish: Hyvinge landskommun) – became part of Hyvinkää (Swedish: Hyvinge) in 1969
- Hämeenkoski – consolidated with Hollola in 2016
- Hämeenlinnan maalaiskunta (Swedish: Tavastehus landskommun) – was divided in 1948 between Hämeenlinna (Swedish: Tavastehus), Renko and Vanaja (Swedish: Vånå)

== I ==
- Ikaalisten maalaiskunta – merged with the neighbouring market town of Ikaalinen in 1972, which became a city in 1977.
- Impilahti (Swedish: Imbilax) – was lost to the USSR in 1944, currently part of Pitkyaranta
- Iniö – consolidated with Houtskär, Korpo, Nagu and Pargas to form Väståboland, and renamed to Pargas in 2011.

== J ==
- Jaakkima – was lost to the USSR in 1944
- Jaala – consolidated with Kouvola in 2009
- Jalasjärvi – consolidated with Kurikka in 2016
- Jeppo – consolidated with Nykarleby in 1975
- Johannes (Swedish: S:t Johannes) – was lost to the USSR in 1944
- Joutseno – consolidated with Lappeenranta (Swedish: Villmanstrand) in 2009
- Juankoski – consolidated with Kuopio in 2017
- Jurva – consolidated with Kurikka in 2009
- Jyväskylän maalaiskunta – consolidated with Jyväskylä in 2009
- Jämsänkoski – consolidated with Jämsä in 2009
- Jäppilä – became part of Pieksänmaa in 2004, along with Pieksämäen maalaiskunta and Virtasalmi
- Jääski – partially lost to the USSR in 1944, partially incorporated into Imatra, Joutseno and Ruokolahti (Swedish: Ruokolax) in 1948

== K ==
- Kaarlela (Swedish: Karleby) – became part of the City of Kokkola (Swedish: Karleby) in 1977
- Kajaanin maalaiskunta (Kajana landskommun) – became part of the City of Kajaani (Swedish: Kajana) in 1977
- Kakskerta – consolidated with Turku (Swedish: Åbo) in 1968
- Kalanti (Swedish: Kaland; formerly known as Uusikirkko Tl, Nykyrka in Swedish) – became part of Uusikaupunki (Swedish: Nystad) in 1993
- Kalvola – consolidated with Hämeenlinna in 2009
- Kangaslampi – became part of the Varkaus in 2005
- Kanneljärvi – was lost to the USSR in 1944
- Karhula – became part of the Kotka in 1977
- Karinainen (Swedish: Karinais) – consolidated along with Pöytyä in 2005 to form the municipality of Pöytyä (Swedish: Pöytis)
- Karis – consolidated with Ekenäs and Pohja (Swedish: Pojo) to form Raseborg in 2009
- Karis landskommun – consolidated with Karis in 1969
- Karjala – became part of Mynämäki (Swedish: Virmo) in 1977
- Karkku (formerly known as Sastamala) – became part of Vammala in 1973
- Karttula – consolidated with Kuopio in 2011
- Karuna – became part of Sauvo (Swedish: Sagu) in 1969
- Karunki (Swedish: Karungi) – became part of the Tornio in 1973
- Kaukola – was lost to the USSR in 1944
- Kauvatsa – became part of Kokemäki in 1969
- Keikyä – formed Äetsä with Kiikka in 1981
- Kemin maalaiskunta (Swedish: Kemi landskommun) – renamed as Keminmaa in 1979
- Kerimäki – consolidated with Savonlinna in 2013
- Kestilä – consolidated with Piippola, Pulkkila and Rantsila to form Siikalatva in 2009
- Kiihtelysvaara – became part of Joensuu in 2005
- Kiikala – consolidated with Salo in 2009
- Kiikka – formed Äetsä along with Keikyä in 1981
- Kimito – consolidated with Dragsfjärd and Västanfjärd to form Kimitoön in 2009
- Kirvu – was lost to the USSR in 1944
- Kisko – consolidated with Salo in 2009
- Kiukainen (Swedish: Kiukais) – consolidated with Eura in 2009
- Kivennapa (Swedish: Kivinebb) – was lost to the USSR in 1944
- Kodisjoki – became part of Rauma (Swedish: Raumo) in 2007
- Koijärvi – was divided between Forssa and Urjala in 1969
- Koivisto (Swedish: Björkö, Vl) – was lost to the USSR in 1944
- Koiviston mlk (Björkö landskommun Vl) – was lost to the USSR in 1944
- Konginkangas – became part of Äänekoski in 1993
- Korpilahti (Swedish: Korpilax) – consolidated with Jyväskylä in 2009
- Korpiselkä – was partially lost to the USSR in 1944, the rest was incorporated into Tuupovaara in 1946
- Korpo – consolidated with Houtskär, Iniö, Nagu and Pargas to form Väståboland
- Kortesjärvi – consolidated with Kauhava in 2009
- Koskenpää – became part of Jämsänkoski in 1969
- Koski Hl. – renamed as Hämeenkoski in 1995
- Kuhmalahti (Swedish: Kuhmalax) – consolidated with Kangasala in 2011
- Kuivaniemi – became part of Ii (Swedish: Ijo) in 2007
- Kullaa – became part of Ulvila (Swedish: Ulvsby) in 2005
- Kulosaari (Swedish: Brändö) – became part of Helsinki (Swedish: Helsingfors) in 1946
- Kuolajärvi – renamed as Salla in 1936
- Kuolemajärvi – was lost to the USSR in 1944
- Kuopion maalaiskunta (Swedish: Kuopio landskommun) – most of the municipality was incorporated into Kuopio and the rest into Siilinjärvi in 1969
- Kuorevesi – became part of Jämsä in 2001
- Kurkijoki (Swedish: Kronoborg) – was lost to the USSR in 1944
- Kuru – consolidated with Ylöjärvi in 2009
- Kuusankoski – consolidated with Kouvola in 2009
- Kuusjoki – consolidated with Salo in 2009
- Kuusjärvi – renamed as Outokummun kauppala in 1968
- Kvevlax became part of Korsholm in 1973
- Kylmäkoski – consolidated with Akaa (Swedish: Ackas) in 2011
- Kymi (Swedish: Kymmene) – became part of the City of Kotka in 1977
- Kyyrölä – became part of Muolaa in 1934
- Käkisalmen mlk (Swedish: Kexholms landskommun) – was lost to the USSR in 1944
- Käkisalmi (Swedish: Kexholm) – was lost to the USSR in 1944
- Kälviä (Swedish: Kelviå) – consolidated with Kokkola (Swedish: Karleby) in 2009
- Köyliö – consolidated with Säkylä in 2016

== L ==
- Lahdenpohja – was lost to the USSR in 1944
- Lammi – consolidated with Hämeenlinna (Swedish: Tavastehus) in 2009
- Lappee – became part of the Lappeenranta (Swedish: Villmanstrand) in 1967
- Lappi – consolidated with Rauma (Swedish: Raumo) in 2009
- Lappfjärd – became part of the Kristinestad in 1973
- Lauritsala – consolidated with Lappeenranta (Swedish: Villmanstrand) in 1967
- Lavansaari (Swedish: Lövskär) – was lost to the USSR in 1944
- Lavia – consolidated with Pori in 2015
- Lehtimäki – consolidated with Alajärvi in 2009
- Leivonmäki – became part of Joutsa in 2008
- Lemu – consolidated with Masku in 2009
- Liljendal – consolidated with Loviisa (Swedish: Lovisa) in 2010
- Lohjan kunta (Swedish: Lojo kommun) and Lohja were consolidated to form Lohja (Swedish: Lojo) in 1997
- Lohjan maalaiskunta (Swedish: Lojo landskommun) – renamed as Lohjan kunta (Swedish: Lojo kommun) in 1978
- Lohtaja (Swedish: Lochteå) – consolidated with Kokkola (Swedish: Karleby) in 2009
- Loimaan kunta (Swedish: Loimaa kommun) and Loimaa consolidated to form Loimaa in 2005
- Loimaan maalaiskunta (Loimijoki landskommun) – renamed as Loimaan kunta in 1978
- Lokalahti (Swedish: Lokalax) – became part of the Uusikaupunki (Swedish: Nystad) in 1981
- Lumivaara – was lost to the USSR in 1944
- Luopioinen (Swedish: Luopiois) – became part of Pälkäne in 2007
- Luvia – merged with Eurajoki in 2017
- Längelmäki – was divided in 2007 between Jämsä and Orivesi

== M ==
- Maaninka – consolidated with Kuopio in 2015
- Maaria (Swedish: S:t Marie) – became part of Turku (Swedish: Åbo) in 1967
- Maxmo (Maksamaa) – consolidated with Vörå to form Vörå-Maxmo in 2007
- Mellilä – consolidated with Loimaa in 2009
- Merimasku – consolidated with Naantali (Swedish: Nådendal) in 2009
- Messukylä (Swedish: Messoby) – became part of Tampere (Swedish: Tammerfors) in 1947
- Metsämaa – became part of Loimaan kunta in 1976
- Metsäpirtti – was lost to the USSR in 1944
- Mietoinen (Swedish: Mietois) – became part of Mynämäki in 2007
- Mikkelin maalaiskunta (Swedish: S:t Michels landskommun) – became part of Mikkeli in 2001
- Mouhijärvi – consolidated with Äetsä and Vammala to form Sastamala in 2009
- Munsala – consolidated with Nykarleby in 1975
- Muolaa – was lost to the USSR in 1944
- Muurla – consolidated with Salo in 2009
- Muuruvesi – became part of Juankoski in 1971
- Mänttä – consolidated with Vilppula (Swedish: Filpula) in 2009. At the same time, Vilppula was renamed as Mänttä-Vilppula (Swedish: Mänttä-Filpula).

== N ==
- Naantalin maalaiskunta (Swedish: Nådendals landskommun) – became part of Naantali (Swedish: Nådendal) in 1964
- Nagu – consolidated with Pargas, Houtskär, Iniö and Korpo to form a new city of Väståboland
- Nastola – consolidated with Lahti in 2016
- Nedervetil (Swedish: Alaveteli) – consolidated with Kronoby in 1969
- Noormarkku (Swedish: Norrmark) – consolidated with Pori (Swedish: Björneborg) in 2010
- Nuijamaa – became part of the City of Lappeenranta (Swedish: Villmanstrand) in 1989
- Nummi – was consolidated with Pusula to form Nummi-Pusula in 1981
- Nurmeksen maalaiskunta (Swedish: Nurmes landskommun) became part of Nurmes in 1973
- Nurmo – consolidated with Seinäjoki in 2009
- Nykarleby landskommun – consolidated with 1975 with Nykarleby

== O ==
- Oravais – consolidated with Vörå-Maxmo to form Vörå in 2011
- Oulujoki (Swedish: Uleälv) – was divided in 1965. Most of it was consolidated with Oulu (Swedish: Uleåborg), and other parts with Haukipudas, Kempele, Kiiminki (Swedish: Kiminge), Oulunsalo (Swedish: Uleåsalo), Tyrnävä, Utajärvi and Ylikiiminki (Swedish: Överkiminge).
- Oulunkylä (Swedish: Åggelby) – became part of the City of Helsinki (Swedish: Helsingfors) in 1946

== P ==
- Paattinen (Swedish: Patis) – became part of Turku (Swedish: Åbo) in 1973
- Paavola – was consolidated with Revonlahti (Swedish: Revolax) to form Ruukki in 1973
- Pargas landskommun – consolidated with Houtskär, Iniö, Nagu and Korpo to form Väståboland
- Pattijoki – became part of the City of Raahe (Swedish: Brahestad) in 2003
- Perniö (Swedish: Bjärnå) – consolidated with Salo in 2009
- Pertteli (Swedish: S:t Bertils) – consolidated with Salo in 2009
- Pertunmaa – consolidated with Mäntyharju in 2025
- Peräseinäjoki and Seinäjoki consolidated to form the City of Seinäjoki in 2005
- Pernå – consolidated with Loviisa in 2010
- Petalax – consolidated with Malax in 1973
- Petsamo – was lost to the USSR in 1944
- Pieksämä – name of Pieksämäki in 1930–1948
- Pieksämäen maalaiskunta (Pieksämäki landskommun) – consolidated with Jäppilä and Virtasalmi to form Pieksänmaa in 2004
- Pieksänmaa – became part of City of Pieksämäki in 2007
- Pielisensuu – became part of the City of Joensuu in 1954
- Pielisjärvi – became part of Lieksa in 1973
- Pietarsaaren maalaiskunta – Finnish name of Pedersöre until 1989
- Pihlajavesi – became part of Keuruu in 1969
- Piikkiö (Pikis) – consolidated with Kaarina in 2009
- Piippola – consolidated with Kestilä, Pulkkila and Rantsila to form Siikalatva in 2009
- Pohja (Swedish: Pojo) – consolidated with Ekenäs and Karis to form Raseborg
- Pohjaslahti – consolidated partly with Vilppula and partly with Virrat in 1973
- Pohjois-Pirkkala – renamed as Nokia in 1938
- Porin maalaiskunta (Swedish: Björneborgs landskommun) – became part of the City of Pori in 1967
- Pörtom – consolidated with Närpes in 1973
- Porvoon maalaiskunta (Swedish: Borgå landskommun) and Porvoo formed the new City of Porvoo in 1997
- Pulkkila – consolidated with Kestilä, Piippola and Rantsila to form Siikalatva in 2009
- Punkaharju – consolidated with Savonlinna in 2013
- Purmo – consolidated with Pedersöre in 1977
- Pusula – was merged with Nummi to form Nummi-Pusula in 1981
- Pyhäjärvi Vpl – was lost to the USSR in 1944
- Pyhäjärvi Ol – renamed as Pyhäsalmi in 1993 and again as Pyhäjärvi in 1996
- Pyhäjärvi Ul – became part of Karkkila in 1969
- Pyhämaa – became part of the City of Uusikaupunki in 1974
- Pyhäsalmi – name of Pyhäjärvi in 1993–1996
- Pyhäselkä – consolidated with Joensuu in 2009
- Pylkönmäki – consolidated with Saarijärvi in 2009
- Pälkjärvi – was partially lost to the USSR in 1944, the rest was incorporated into Tohmajärvi in 1946

== R ==
- Räisälä – was lost to the USSR in 1944
- Rantsila (Swedish: Frantsila) – consolidated with Kestilä, Piippola and Pulkkila to form Siikalatva in 2009
- Rauman maalaiskunta (Swedish: Raumo landskommun) – became part of the City of Rauma in 1993
- Rautio – became part of Kalajoki in 1973
- Rautu – was lost to the USSR in 1944
- Renko (Swedish: Rengo) – consolidated with Hämeenlinna in 2009
- Replot – became part of Korsholm in 1973
- Revonlahti (Swedish: Revonlax) – consolidated with Paavola to form Ruukki in 1973
- Riistavesi – became part of the City of Kuopio in 1973
- Ristiina – became part of City of Mikkeli (Swedish: S:t Michel) in 2013
- Rovaniemen maalaiskunta (Swedish: Rovaniemi landskommun) – was consolidated with the City of Rovaniemi to form the City of Rovaniemi in 2006
- Ruotsinpyhtää (Swedish: Strömfors) – consolidated with Loviisa in 2010
- Ruskeala – was lost to the USSR
- Ruukki – became part of Siikajoki in 2007
- Rymättylä (Swedish: Rimito) – consolidated with Naantali in 2009

== S ==
- Saari – consolidated with Parikkala and Uukuniemi to form Parikkala in 2005
- Sahalahti (Swedish: Sahalax) – became part of Kangasala in 2005
- Säkkijärvi – was partially lost to the USSR in 1944, the rest was incorporated into Miehikkälä and Ylämaa in 1946
- Sakkola – was lost to the USSR in 1944
- Salmi – was lost to the USSR in 1944
- Saloinen (Swedish: Salois; known as Salo until 1913) – became part of the City of Raahe in 1973
- Sammatti – consolidated with Lohja in 2009
- Sastamala – the old name of Karkku. The name was re-introduced in 2009, when Äetsä, Mouhijärvi and Vammala were consolidated.
- Savonranta – consolidated with Savonlinna in 2009
- Säyneinen – became part of Juankoski in 1971
- Seinäjoen maalaiskunta (Swedish: Seinäjoki landskommun) – became part of Seinäjoki in 1959
- Seiskari (Swedish: Seitskär) – was lost to the USSR in 1944
- Sideby – became part of the City of Kristinestad in 1973
- Simpele – was partially lost to the USSR in 1944, the rest was incorporated into Rautjärvi in 1973
- Sippola – was consolidated with Anjala to form Anjalankosken kauppala in 1975
- Snappertuna – most of the municipality was incorporated into Ekenäs and the rest into Karis in 1977
- Somerniemi (Swedish: Sommarnäs) – became part of Somero in 1977
- Soanlahti – was lost to the USSR in 1944
- Solf – the part on the mainland became part of Korsholm in 1973
- Sortavala (Swedish: Sordavala) – was lost to the USSR in 1944
- Sortavalan mlk (Swedish: Sordavala landskommun) – was lost to the USSR in 1944
- Suistamo – was lost to the USSR in 1944
- Sumiainen (Swedish: Sumiais) – became part of City of Äänekoski together with Suolahti in 2007
- Sundom – became part of the City of Vaasa in 1973
- Suodenniemi – became part of City of Vammala in 2007
- Suojärvi – was lost to the USSR in 1944
- Suolahti – became part of City of Äänekoski together with Sumiainen in 2007
- Suomenniemi – became part of City of Mikkeli (Swedish: S:t Michel) in 2013
- Suomusjärvi – consolidated with Salo in 2009
- Suoniemi – became part of the City of Nokia in 1973
- Suursaari – was lost to the USSR in 1944
- Särkisalo (Swedish: Finby) – consolidated with Salo in 2009
- Säräisniemi – a part of Utajärvi was annexed to Säräisniemi to form the municipality of Vaala in 1954
- Säynätsalo – became part of the City of Jyväskylä in 1993
- Sääksmäki – became part of Valkeakoski in 1973
- Sääminki (Säminge) – most of the municipality was incorporated into Savonlinna and the rest into Punkaharju in 1973

== T ==
- Tarvasjoki – consolidated with Lieto in 2015
- Teisko – was divided between Tampere and Kuru in 1972
- Temmes – became part of Tyrnävä in 2001
- Tenala – became part of the City of Ekenäs in 1993
- Terijoki – was lost to the USSR in 1944
- Terjärv – consolidated with Kronoby in 1969
- Toijala – consolidated with Viiala to form Akaa in 2007
- Tottijärvi – became part of the City of Nokia in 1976
- Turtola – renamed as Pello in 1949
- Tuulos – consolidated with Hämeenlinna in 2009
- Tuupovaara – became part of the City of Joensuu in 2005
- Tyrvää (Swedish: Tyrvis) – became part of Vammala in 1973, originally Vammala was separated from Tyrvää in 1915
- Tyrväntö – became part of Hattula in 1971
- Tytärsaari – was lost to the USSR in 1944
- Töysä – consolidated with Alavus in 2013

== U ==
- Ullava – consolidated with Kokkola in 2009
- Uudenkaupungin maalaiskunta (Nystads landskommun) – became part of the City of Uusikaupunki in 1969
- Uukuniemi – consolidated with Parikkala and Saari to form Parikkala in 2005
- Uusikirkko (Swedish: Nykyrka) – was lost to the USSR in 1944
- Uusikirkko Tl (Swedish: Nykyrka Åbo län) – renamed as Kalanti in 1936, became part of the City of Uusikaupunki in 1993
- Uskela – became part of Salo in 1967

== V ==
- Vahto – consolidated with Rusko in 2009
- Vahviala – was partially lost to the USSR in 1944, the rest was incorporated into Lappee and Ylämaa in 1946
- Valkjärvi – was lost to the USSR in 1944
- Valkeala – consolidated with Kouvola in 2009
- Valtimo – consolidated with Nurmes in 2020
- Vammala – consolidated with Äetsä and Mouhijärvi to form Sastamala in 2009
- Vampula – consolidated with Huittinen in 2009
- Vanaja (Swedish: Vånå) – was divided between Hämeenlinna, Hattula, Janakkala and Renko in 1967
- Varpaisjärvi – consolidated with Lapinlahti in 2011
- Vehkalahti (Swedish: Veckelax) – became part of the City of Hamina in 2003
- Vehmersalmi – became part of the City of Kuopio in 2005
- Velkua – consolidated with Naantali in 2009
- Viiala – consolidated with Toijala to form Akaa in 2007
- Viipuri (Swedish: Viborg) – was lost to the USSR in 1944
- Viipurin maalaiskunta (Swedish: Viborgs landskommun) – was lost to the USSR in 1944
- Viljakkala – became part of City of Ylöjärvi in 2007
- Vilppula (Swedish: Filpula) – consolidated with Mänttä to form Mänttä-Vilppula in 2009
- Virtasalmi – consolidated with Pieksämäen maalaiskunta and Jäppilä to form Pieksänmaa in 2004
- Vörå (Finnish: Vöyri) – consolidated with Maxmo to form Vörå-Maxmo in 2007
- Vörå-Maxmo – consolidated with Oravais to form (new) Vörå in 2011
- Vuoksela – was lost to the USSR in 1944
- Vuoksenranta – was lost to the USSR in 1944
- Vuolijoki – became part of the City of Kajaani in 2007
- Värtsilä – was partially lost to the USSR in 1944, consolidated with Tohmajärvi to form Tohmajärvi in 2005
- Västanfjärd – consolidated with Dragsfjärd and Kimito to form Kimitoön in 2009

== Y ==
- Ylämaa – consolidated with Lappeenranta in 2010
- Ylihärmä – consolidated with Kauhava in 2009
- Ylikiiminki (Swedish: Överkiminge) – consolidated with Oulu in 2009
- Ylistaro – consolidated with Seinäjoki in 2009
- Yläne – consolidated with Pöytyä in 2009

== Ä ==
- Äetsä – consolidated with Mouhijärvi and Vammala to form Sastamala in 2009
- Äyräpää – was lost to the USSR in 1944
- Äänekosken maalaiskunta (Swedish: Äänekoski landskommun) – consolidated with Äänekoski in 1969

== Ö ==
- Öja – became part of Kaarlela in 1969
- Övermark – consolidated with Närpes in 1973

== See also ==
- Former municipalities of Norway
- Viipuri province
