= Pattijoki =

- Former municipality
- Pattijoen kunta Pattijoki kommun
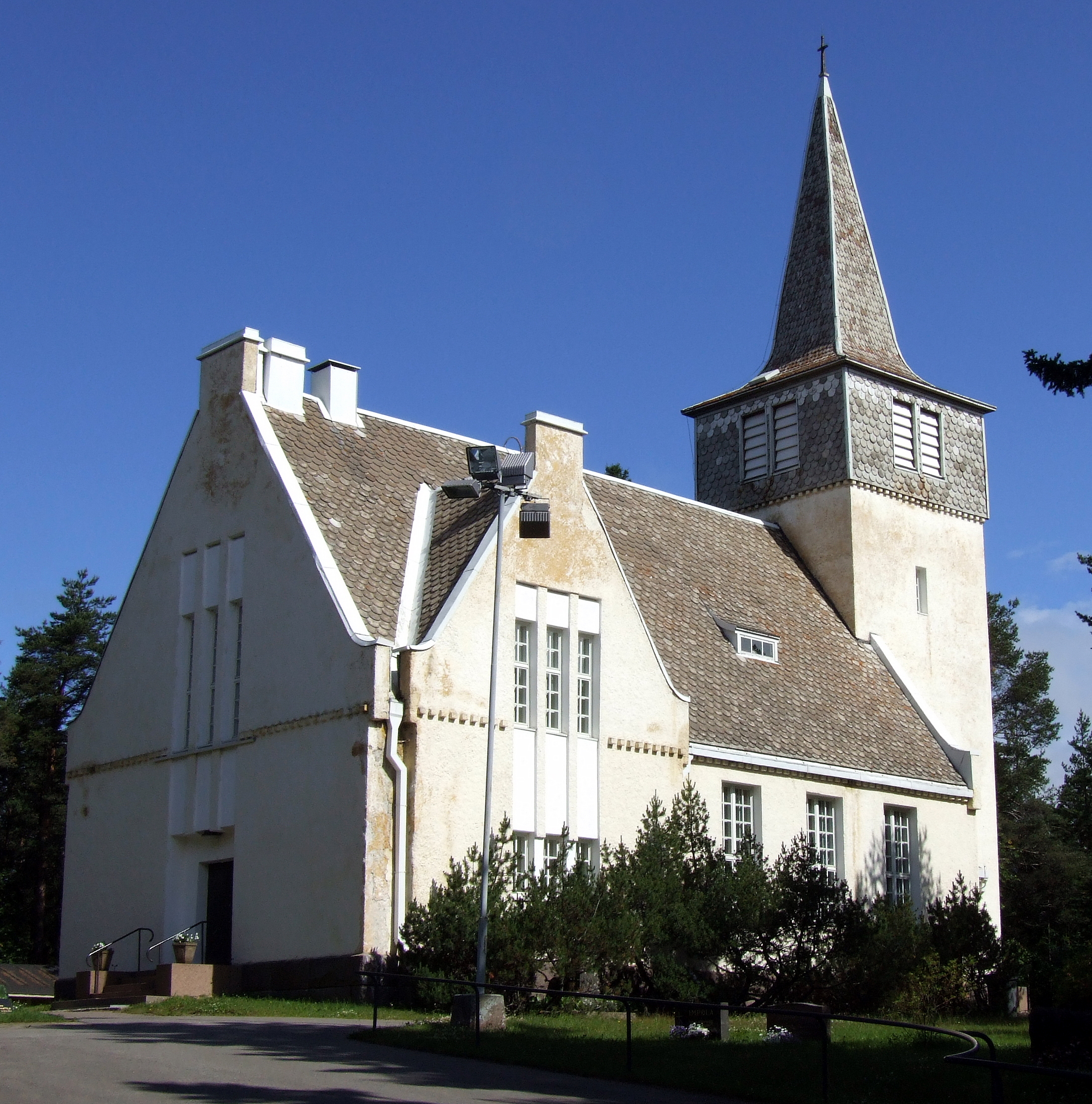
- Pattijoki Church.

- Coat of arms

- Location of Pattijoki in Finland
- Coordinates: 64.7000027°N 24.5833258°E
- Country: Finland
- Province: Oulu Province
- Region: Northern Ostrobothnia
- Established: 1865
- Merged into Raahe: 2003
- Seat: Pattijoen kirkonkylä

Area
  - Land: 260.2 km^{2} (100.5 sq mi)

Population (2002-12-31)
  - Total: 6,253

Pattijoki is a settlement and former municipality in Finland. It was a part of the Oulu Province, but now located in the region of Northern Ostrobothnia. It was consolidated with the town of Raahe in 2003.

It bordered Raahe, Siikajoki, Vihanti and Pyhäjoki. It has also bordered Saloinen, Revonlahti, Paavola and Ruukki when said municipalities existed.

== History ==
Pattijoki is named after a homonymous river. Its name seems to refer to the local dialectal word patti meaning "puddle". The de jure border of Sweden and Novgorod according to Treaty of Oreshek may have been at the river, however it may have also been the Pyhäjoki further south.

Pattijoki was first mentioned in 1546 as a part of the Saloinen parish, which at the time was called Salo. The area of Vihanti was originally a wilderness used as hunting grounds by the people of Pattijoki and Saloinen.

In 1649, the town of Salo was established from the lands of this parish. The town was soon renamed Brahestad, or Raahe.

When the municipal system was implemented in 1865, the municipality was called Salon emäseurakunta, with its seat in the village of Pattijoki. The area of the later Saloinen municipality was known as Salon kappeliseurakunta or Salo for short. The municipality has been called Pattijoki since the early 20th century, becoming the official name in 1920.

Pattijoki acted as a separate municipality until 2003, when it was consolidated with Raahe.

== Church ==
The Pattijoki church was opened in 1912. It was designed by Josef Stenbäck and is made from concrete. In 2003, it became a local church within the Raahe parish.
