= Metsämaa =

- Former municipality
- Metsämaan kunta Metsämaa kommun
- Coat of arms

- Location of Metsämaa in Finland
- Coordinates: 60.9377920°N 23.1569686°E
- Country: Finland
- Province: Turku and Pori Province
- Region: Finland Proper
- Established: 1914
- Merged into Loimaan kunta: 1976
- Seat: Metsämaan kirkonkylä

Area
  - Land: 93.2 km^{2} (36.0 sq mi)

Population (1975-12-31)
  - Total: 1,079

Metsämaa is a village and a former municipality of Finland in the former Turku and Pori Province, now in the region of Finland Proper.

The municipality was consolidated with Loimaan kunta in 1976, which was consolidated with the town of Loimaa in 2005.

== Geography ==
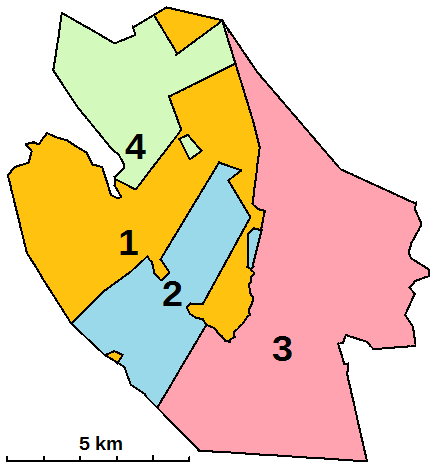
Register villages of Metsämaa in 1927. 1: Metsämaa, 2: Kallio, 3: Korpi, 4: Majanoja

Metsämaa is located on the banks of the river Kojonjoki (Koijoki, Koenjoki) which begins from Koijärvi and discharges into the Loimijoki near Alastaro.

The municipality of Metsämaa bordered Punkalaidun, Humppila, Ypäjä and Loimaan kunta.

=== Villages ===
Metsämaa has four register villages: Kallio, Korpi, Majanoja and Metsämaa (Metsämaan kirkonkylä).

== History ==
Metsämaa was originally a part of the Loimaa parish. The village was first mentioned in 1587 as Metzänmaa. Its name literally means "forest land", as the area of Metsämaa is more forested in comparison to Loimaa proper.

Metsämaa gained chapel rights in 1777 and a church was built in the village. The first chaplain was designated in 1799. In 1914, Metsämaa became an independent parish and municipality.

The municipality was consolidated with Loimaan kunta in 1976. The parish remained independent until 2000. Loimaan kunta was consolidated with the town of Loimaa in 2005.

== Church ==
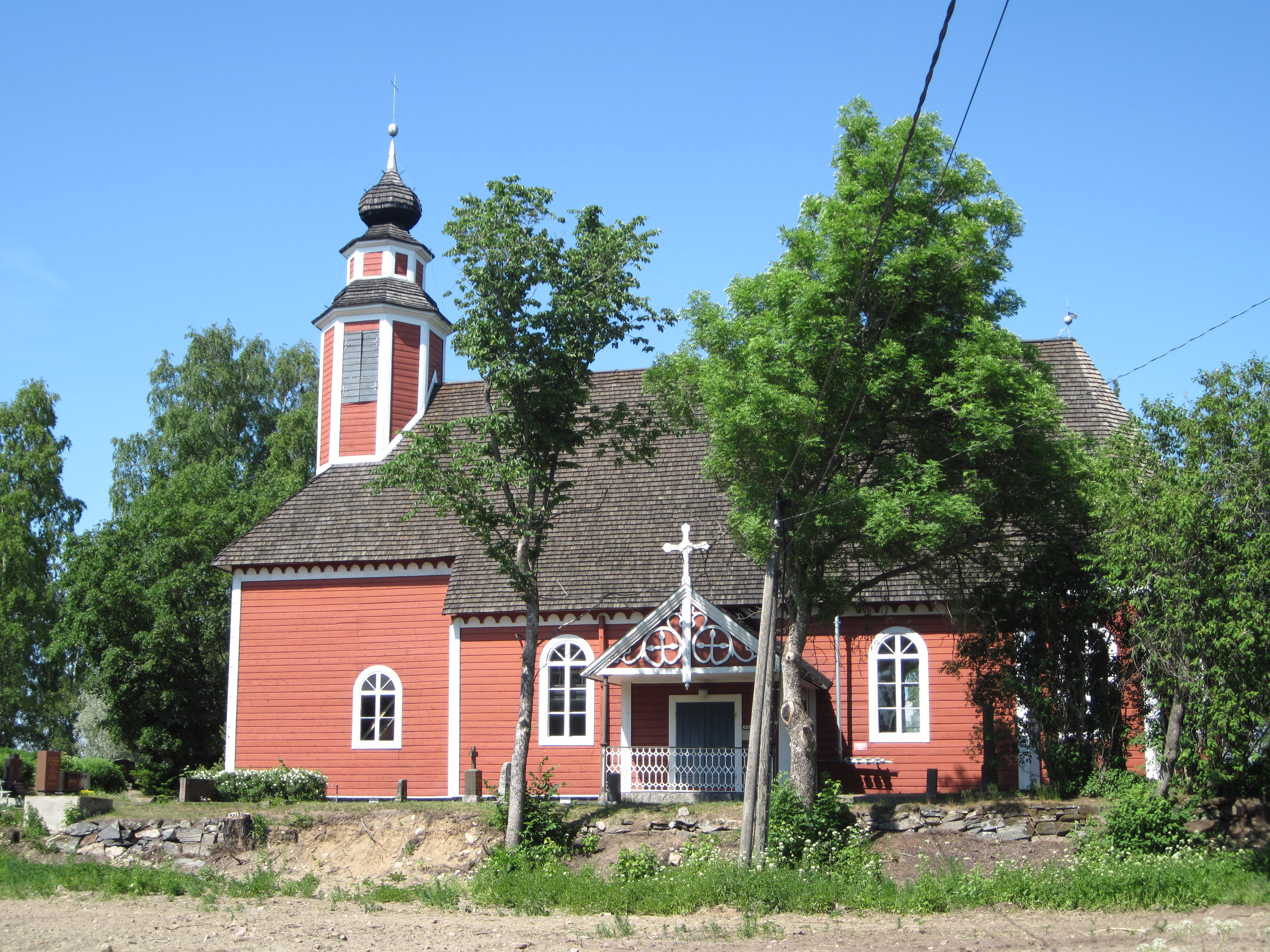

The church of Metsämaa was built in 1777. It has 350 seats and a graveyard is located around it. The graveyard also includes soldier graves.

== Services ==
=== Education ===
Metsämaa has a school for grades 1-6 (ala-aste). The school was established in 1881 and consists of the original building and a newer one built in the 1940s.

== Notable people ==
- Kosti Klemelä
- Vilho Tervasmäki
