= Kodisjoki =

Former municipality of southwest Finland

- Former municipality
- Kodisjoen kunta Kodisjoki kommun
- Coat of arms

- Location of Kodisjoki in Finland
- Coordinates: 61°01′40″N 021°41′15″E
- Country: Finland
- Province: Western Finland Province
- Region: Satakunta
- Established: 1896
- Merged into Rauma: 2007

Area
  - Land: 41.16 km^{2} (15.89 sq mi)
  - Water: 1.67 km^{2} (0.64 sq mi)

Population (2006-12-31)
  - Total: 570

Kodisjoki is a tiny village and a former municipality of Finland. At the time of the municipality's disestablishment, Kodisjoki was located in the province of Western Finland, now it is in the Satakunta region. Kodisjoki became part of the city of Rauma in 2007.

The municipality was unilingually Finnish.

== Geography ==
Kodisjoki bordered Rauma, Lappi, Laitila and Pyhäranta. Until 1997, it bordered Rauman maalaiskunta instead of Rauma.

=== Villages ===
Officially Kodisjoki only had a single village, also called Kodisjoki. The village consists of multiple parts: Ahteri, Heikolankulma, Heinilä, Isopuoli, Sahankulma, Vuorela and Ylöjänpää.

== History ==
Kodisjoki was first mentioned in 1504 as a part of the Laitila parish. Its name is derived from a dialectal word kodiksin/kodismaa referring to a garden or a small field next to a house. The name of Kodjala in Laitila has a similar etymology. Kodisjoki became a separate municipality in 1896, but due to its small size, it was still ecclesiastically subordinate to Laitila.

Kodisjoki was consolidated with the town of Rauma in 2007.
