= Paavola =

- Former municipality
- Paavolan kunta Paavola kommun
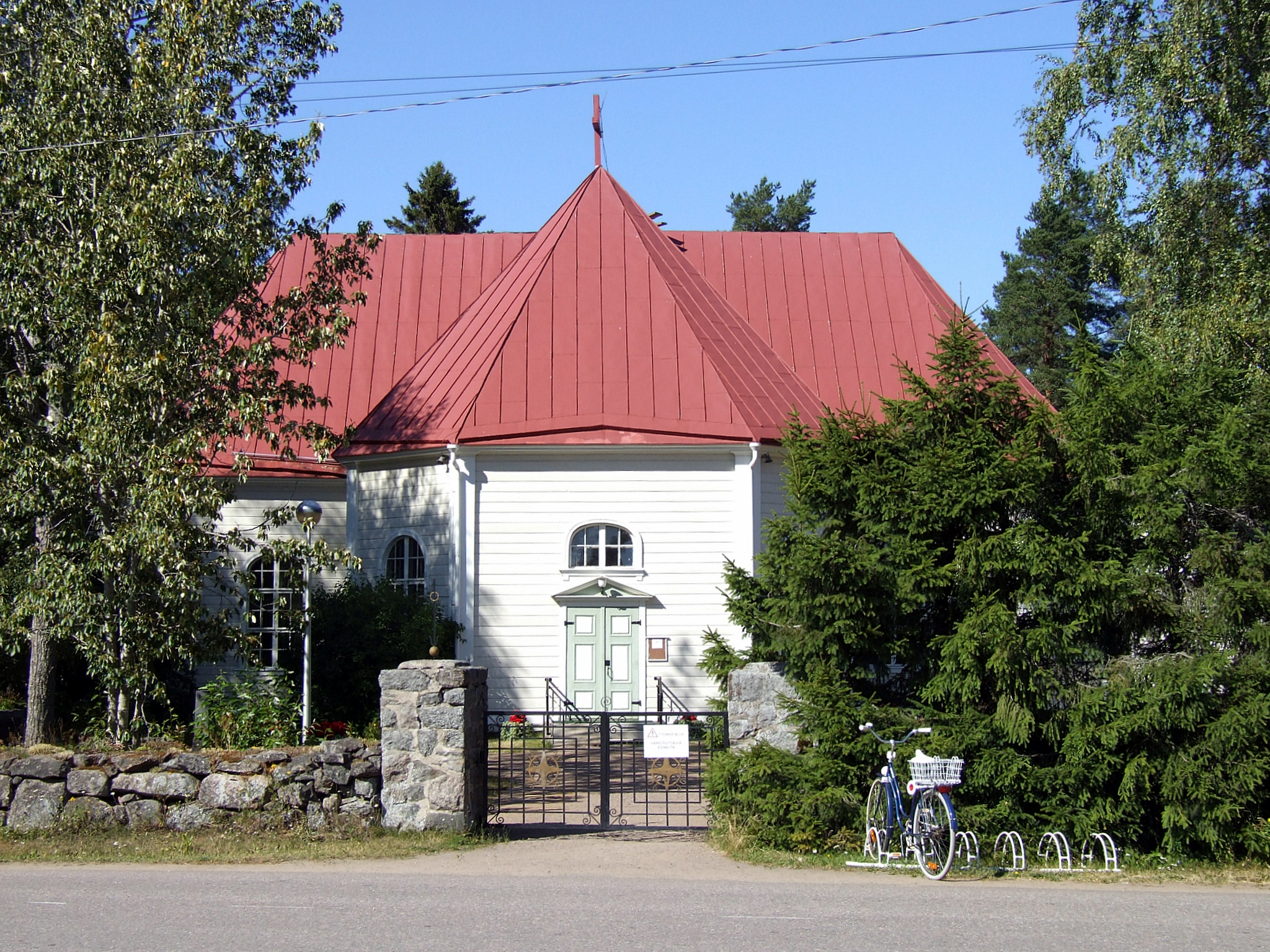
- Paavola Church

- Coat of arms

- Location of Paavola in Finland
- Coordinates: 64°36′30″N 025°12′20″E
- Country: Finland
- Region: North Ostrobothnia
- Established: 1874
- Consolidated: 1973

Area
  - Land: 565.8 km^{2} (218.5 sq mi)

Population (1970)
  - Total: 4,568
  - Density: 8.074/km^{2} (20.91/sq mi)
- Time zone: UTC+2 (EET)
  - Summer (DST): UTC+3 (EEST)

Paavola is a former municipality of Finland, now part of Siikajoki. Its center is located by the Siikajoki river. Though lacking rail transport connections, the settlement lies in the crossroads of routes 86 and 807.

In 1973, Paavola was consolidated with the neighboring municipality of Revonlahti to form the municipality of Ruukki. Ruukki in turn was consolidated with Siikajoki in 2007.

== Geography ==
The municipality of Paavola bordered Revonlahti, Liminka, Rantsila, Vihanti and Pattijoki.

=== Villages ===
- Lappi
- Luohua
- Pehkola (Paavolan kirkonkylä)
- Ruukki

== History ==
The name of Paavola is derived from the name of Paavo Laurinpoika, who established a farm in the area in the 1550s. Paavola was a part of the Siikajoki parish, becoming a chapel community in 1811 and a separate parish in 1874.

Paavola and Revonlahti united in 1973 to form Ruukki, which was consolidated with Siikajoki in 2007.

== Picture Gallery ==
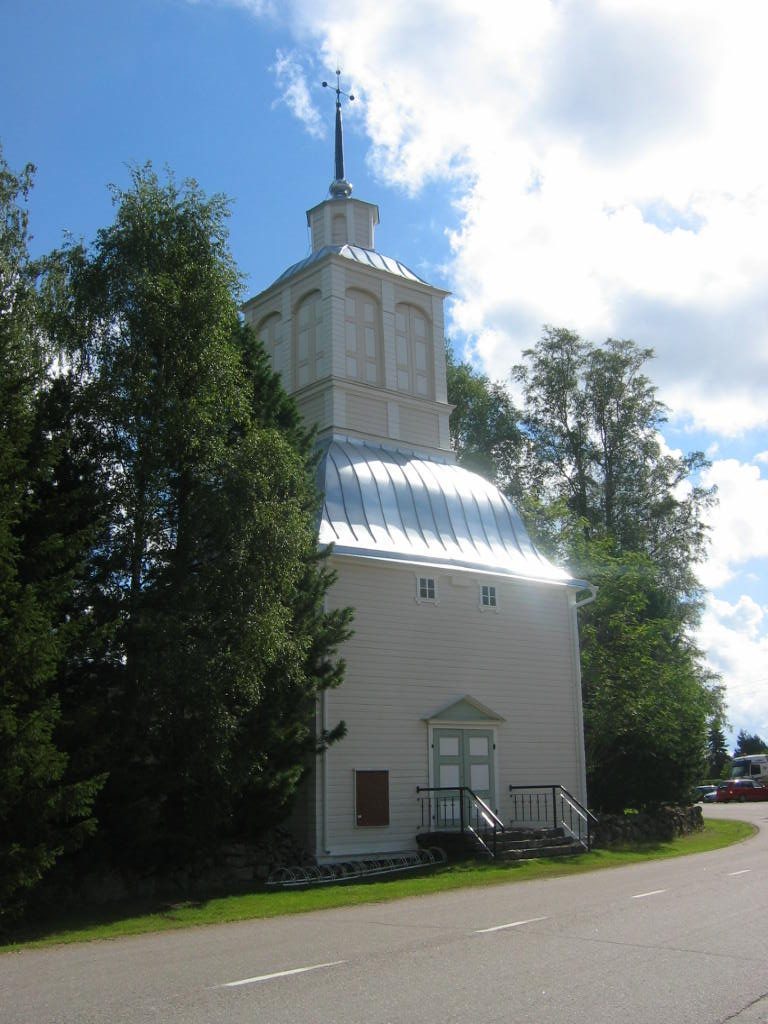
Paavola Church Campanile
