= Luohuan Ylipää =

Village in Siikajoki, Finland

Coordinates: 64°32′00″N 025°12′00″E

Luohuan Ylipää is a village in Siikajoki, Northern Ostrobothnia region of Finland.
