= Jouko Hassi =

Finnish sprinter

Jouko Hassi (born November 19, 1959, in Rantsila) is a Finnish former sprinter. His club team was Oulun Pyrintö.

He competed in 100 metres and 4 x 100 metres relay at the 1983 World Championships, but was eliminated in the heats on both occasions.

== Personal bests ==
- 100m: 10.45 in Ylivieska, 1984
- 200m: 21.26 in Budapest, 1981

== Progression 100m ==
Year	Time	Wind	City	Date
1982	10.61	+0.3	Helsinki	28 July 1982
1983	10.46	+1.6	Ylivieska	17 July 1983
1984	10.45	+1.7	Ylivieska	1 July 1984
1985	10.89	+2.0	Kempele	13 June 1985
1986	10.92	-0.8	Tornio	29 June 1986
1987	10.96	-0.2	Kuopio	29 July 1987
