= Vilho Tervasmäki =

Finnish soldier and historian (1915–2010)

Vilho Olavi Tervasmäki (11 July 1915, Metsämaa – 15 July 2010) was a colonel on the Finnish General Staff, and later a Doctor of Political Science and war historian.

He was born in the Grand Duchy of Finland, Russian Empire, to Oscar Anselmi Tervasmäki and Lydia Alexandra Ali-Jaukkari.
