= Yrjö Halonen =

Finnish politician

- Born: 23 May 1862; Kestilä, Finland
- Died: 11 August 1941 (aged 79)
- Occupations: Cantor; bank director; politician

Yrjö Halonen (23 May 1862 – 11 August 1941) was a Finnish cantor, bank director and politician, born in Kestilä. He was a member of the Diet of Finland from 1897 to 1905 and of the Parliament of Finland from 1908 to 1909 and again from 1913 to 1916, representing the Finnish Party.
