= Seinäjoen maalaiskunta =

- Former municipality
- Seinäjoen maalaiskunta Seinäjoki landskommun
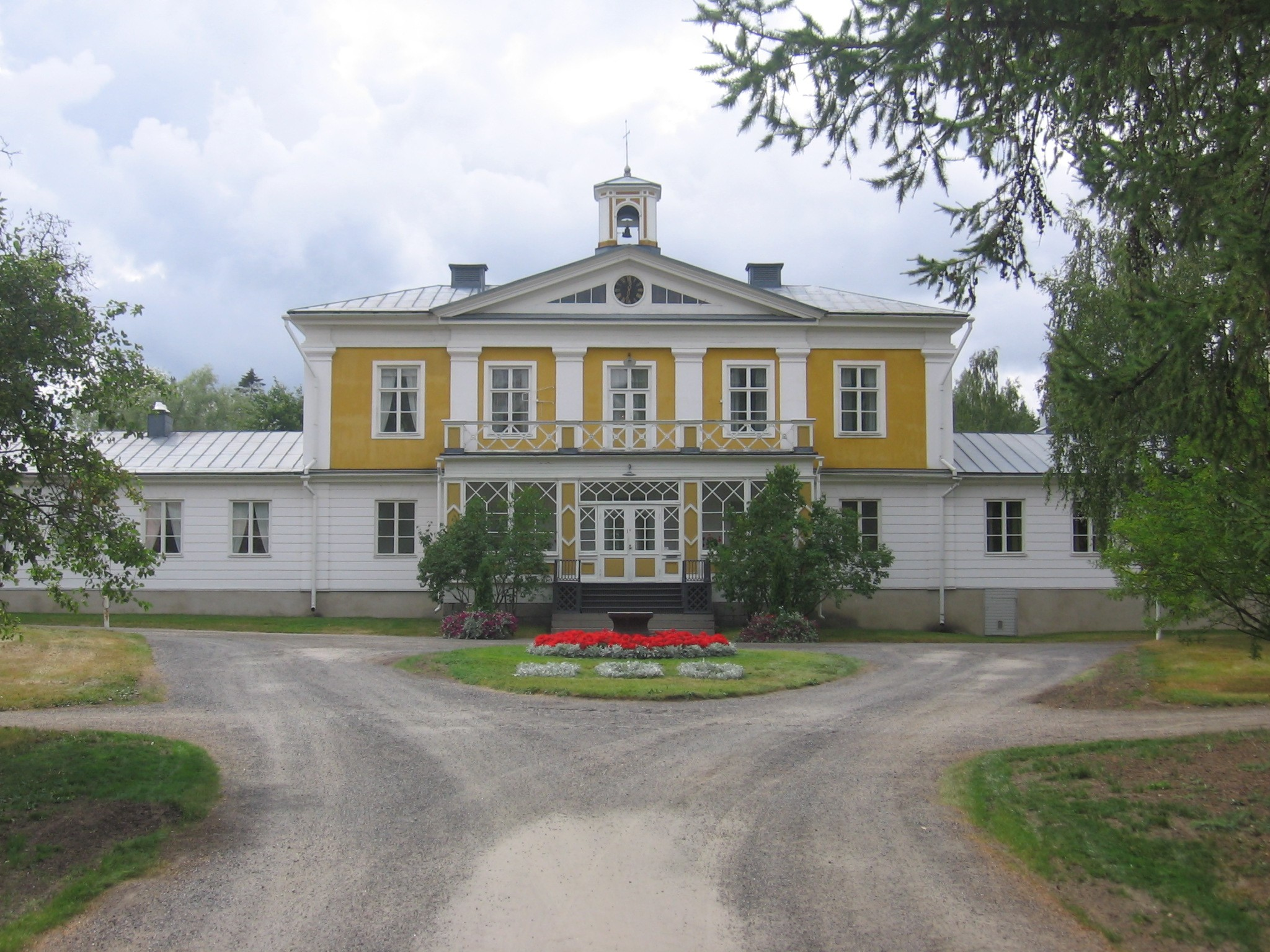
- Törnävä Manor

- Coat of arms

- Location in Finland (1935).
- Interactive map of Seinäjoen maalaiskunta
- Location within South Ostrobothnia Location within Finland Location within Europe
- Coordinates: 62°46′09″N 22°51′04″E
- Country: Finland
- Province: Vaasa Province
- Modern-day region: South Ostrobothnia
- Established from Ilmajoki: 1868
- Consolidated to Seinäjoki: 1959

Area
  - Land: 110.9 km^{2} (42.8 sq mi)

Population (1958-12-31)
  - Total: 5,164
  - Density: 46.56/km^{2} (120.6/sq mi)

Seinäjoen maalaiskunta (lit. 'Seinäjoki rural municipality'), before 1931 simply Seinäjoki, is a former municipality of Finland, which was located in Vaasa Province. The municipality was established in 1868 when it was separated from Ilmajoki. After the railways were built in the 1880s, the surrounding area of Seinäjoki railway station gained commercial and regional significance and it was separated as a market town from the municipality in 1931. The municipality of Seinäjoki ceased to exist in a forced merger with the market town in 1959. A year after the merger the market town of Seinäjoki became officially a city.

The centre of Seinäjoki municipality was modern-day Törnävä district of Seinäjoki, which houses the Törnävä Manor of the Wasastjerna noble family. The manor also served as a municipal hall for the municipality.
