= Tapio Junno =

Finnish sculptor

Tapio Junno (12 January 1940, Piippola – 25 December 2006) was a Finnish sculptor. He received the Pro Finlandia medal for his work in 1989.

One central element of Tapio Junno's sculpture is a bronze male, often dazzled by a piercing ray of light. The figures express the alternating feelings of human existence, such as pain and joy, light and shadow.
