= Piippola =

- Village, former municipality
- Piippolan kunta Piippola kommun
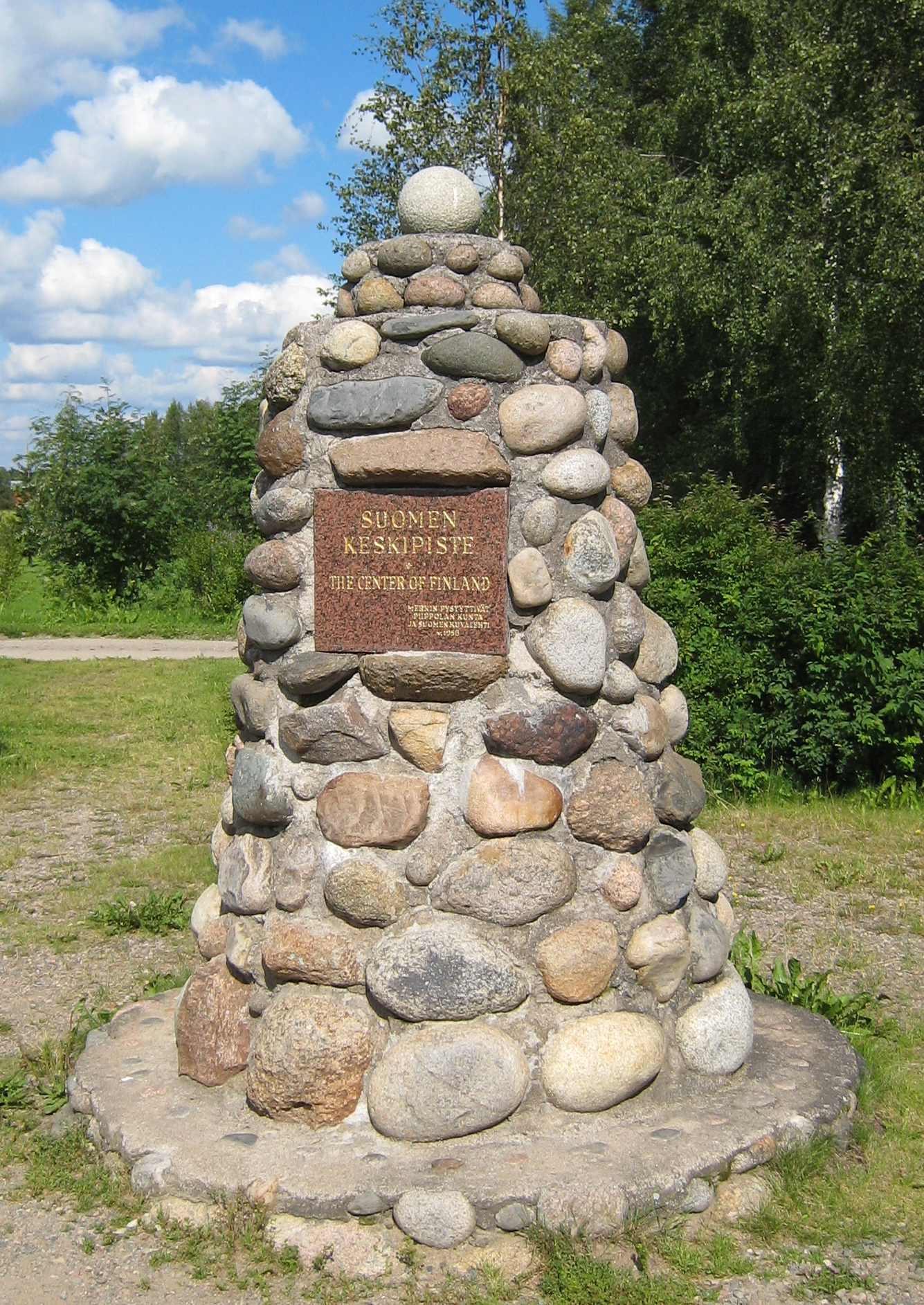
- Monument in Piippola, Finland, marking "The Center of Finland", erected in 1958

- Coat of arms

- Location of Piippola in Finland
- Coordinates: 64°10′40″N 25°57′55″E
- Country: Finland
- Region: North Ostrobothnia
- Sub-region: Siikalatva sub-region
- Charter: 1865
- Consolidated: 2009

Area
  - Total: 464.98 km^{2} (179.53 sq mi)
  - Land: 455.7 km^{2} (175.9 sq mi)
  - Water: 9.28 km^{2} (3.58 sq mi)

Population (2015-12-31)
  - Total: 550
  - Density: 1.2/km^{2} (3.1/sq mi)
- Time zone: UTC+2 (EET)
  - Summer (DST): UTC+3 (EEST)

Piippola is a village and a former municipality of Finland.

Piippola is located in the province of Oulu and is part of the North Ostrobothnia region. The village has a population of 550 (31 December 2015). The former municipality covered an area of 464.98 km^{2} (179.53 sq mi) of which 9.28 km^{2} (3.58 sq mi) is water. The population density was 2.75 inhabitants per square kilometre (7.1/sq mi).

The municipality was unilingually Finnish.

The municipality was consolidated with Kestilä, Pulkkila and Rantsila on 1 January 2009 to form a new municipality of Siikalatva.

== Geography ==
The municipality of Piippola bordered Pulkkila, Kestilä, Pyhäntä, Kärsämäki and Haapavesi.

=== Villages ===
- Kangaskylä
- Lamu
- Leskelä
- Piippola (Piippolan kirkonkylä)

== History ==
The name of Piippola is derived from the surname Piippo or Piipponen, most likely a Karelian family. The upper Siikajoki river area was partially settled by Savonians in the 1560s, due to which the area was also known as Siikasavo. Despite this, most settlers in the area were Ostrobothnians.

Piippola was first mentioned in 1605 as Piippoila, when it was a part of the Saloinen parish and its chapel community of Siikajoki, which became a separate parish in 1689. Piippola became a chapel community in the 10th of October 1769, though a church was already built earlier without permission.

In 1845, the parish of Siikajoki was divided into two parts: Siikajoki proper and Piippola. The Piippola parish also included Kestilä, Pulkkila and Pyhäntä. Kestilä was separated in 1871, while Pulkkila and Pyhäntä became separate in 1899.

In 2009, Piippola united with Pulkkila, Kestilä and Rantsila to form the municipality of Siikalatva. The name was originally used for the administrative sub-region (now Haapavesi-Siikalatva), referring to the location of the municipalities on the upper Siikajoki river. The parish of Siikalatva was formed earlier in 2006 as a merger of the Piippola, Kestilä, Pulkkila and Pyhäntä parishes. The parish of Rantsila joined in 2008.

== See also ==
- Piippolan vaarilla oli talo, a Finnish translation of the "Old MacDonald Had a Farm" song
