= Saloinen =

- Former municipality
- Saloisten kunta
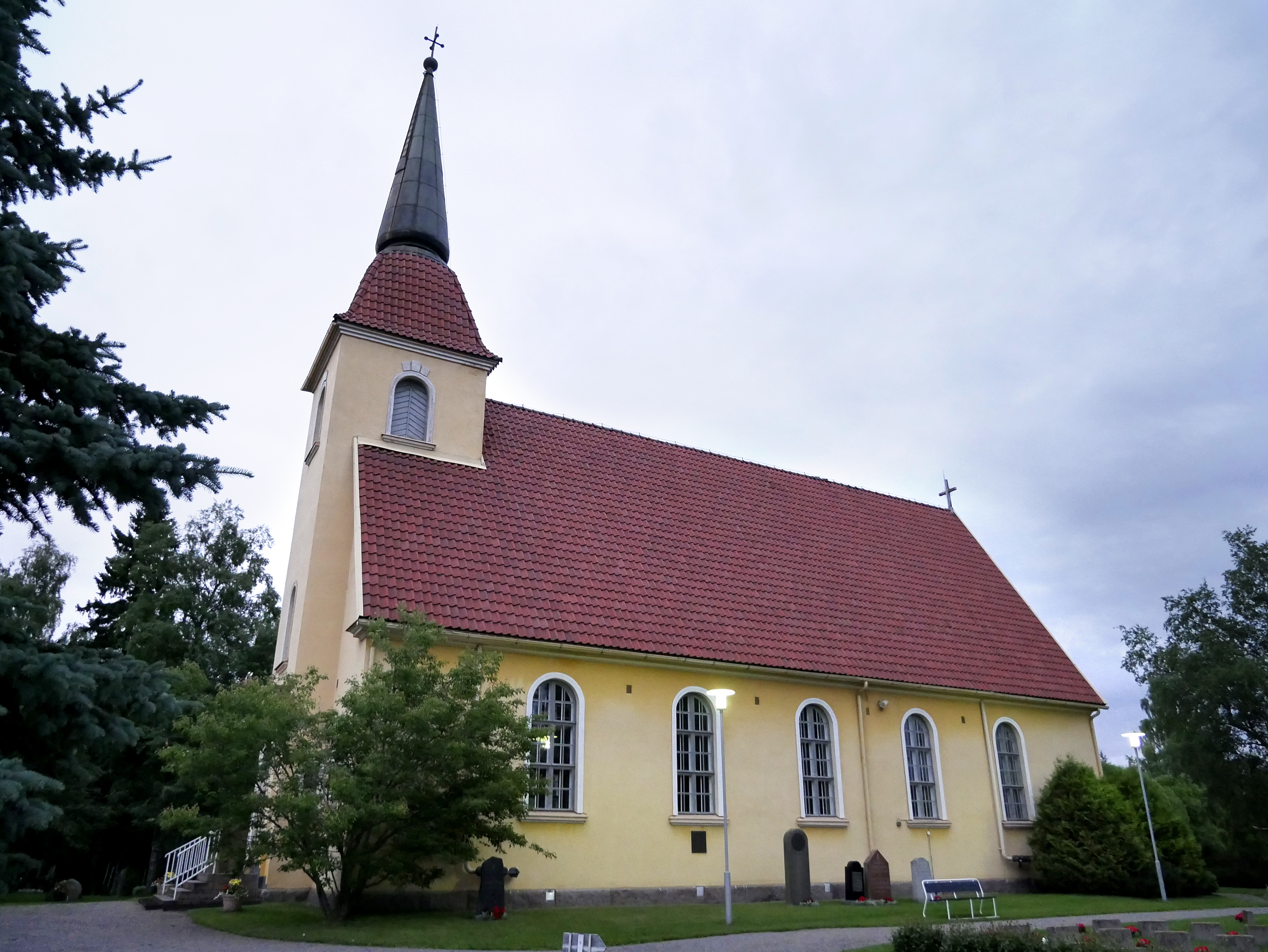
- Saloinen Church.

- Coat of arms

- Location of Saloinen in Finland
- Coordinates: 64.6561328°N 24.4679606°E
- Country: Finland
- Province: Oulu Province
- Region: Northern Ostrobothnia
- Merged into Raahe: 1973
- Seat: Salonkylä

Area
  - Land: 248.8 km^{2} (96.1 sq mi)

Population (1972-12-31)
  - Total: 5,914

Saloinen is a former municipality of Finland. It was a part of the Oulu Province, but now located in the region of Northern Ostrobothnia. It was consolidated with the town of Raahe in 1973.

It bordered Raahe, Pyhäjoki and Pattijoki.

== Villages ==
Saloinen consists of the following land register villages:

- Saloinen (Salonkylä)
- Savolahti
- Palo
- Piehinki

== History ==
Saloinen has existed at least since the 1320s as Salo. It was originally subordinate to the Pedersöre parish. The word salo in this context refers to an island, as the central area was originally located on an island, later joining the mainland due to post-glacial rebound.

Salo became a separate parish in 1407. It differs from other old northern Ostrobothnian parishes in the sense that it was not formed on a river valley. The administrative unit corresponding to the parish was originally known as Ranta, or Strand in Swedish. This administrative unit also included Kalajoki, Ii and Liminka, until the 16th century it also included Kemi.

Hailuoto was a part of the Salo parish until 1573, while Siikajoki was a part of Salo until 1689.

In 1649, Per Brahe established the town of Salo. Brahe purchased the Salo parish in 1652 and renamed the town to Brahestad (Raahe) after himself.

The municipal system (separation of administrative and religious units) was implemented in 1865, and the Salo parish became two municipalities: Salon kappeliseurakunta or modern Saloinen and Salon emäseurakunta or Pattijoki. Both municipalities were called Salo for short, which caused confusion not only between the two, but also with Oulunsalo (which was sometimes called Salo by the locals) and the more distant Salo in Finland Proper. Salon kappeliseurakunta was renamed Saloinen in 1913. Salon emäseurakunta was still called Salo Ol until 1920, when it was renamed Pattijoki.

Saloinen was consolidated with Raahe in 1973.

== Notable residents ==
- Ljungo Thomae, pastor, translated laws into Finnish
- Fredrik Gabriel Hedberg, priest and founder of an evangelical revival movement
- Eeva Inkeri Kerola, politician
- Antti Kinnunen, politician
- Martti Albert Levón, engineer and professor

== Economy ==
=== Mining ===
Gold was found in the area in the 80s. The Laivakangas mine was established in 2011.
