= Siikalatva =

- Municipality
- Siikalatvan kunta Siikalatva kommun
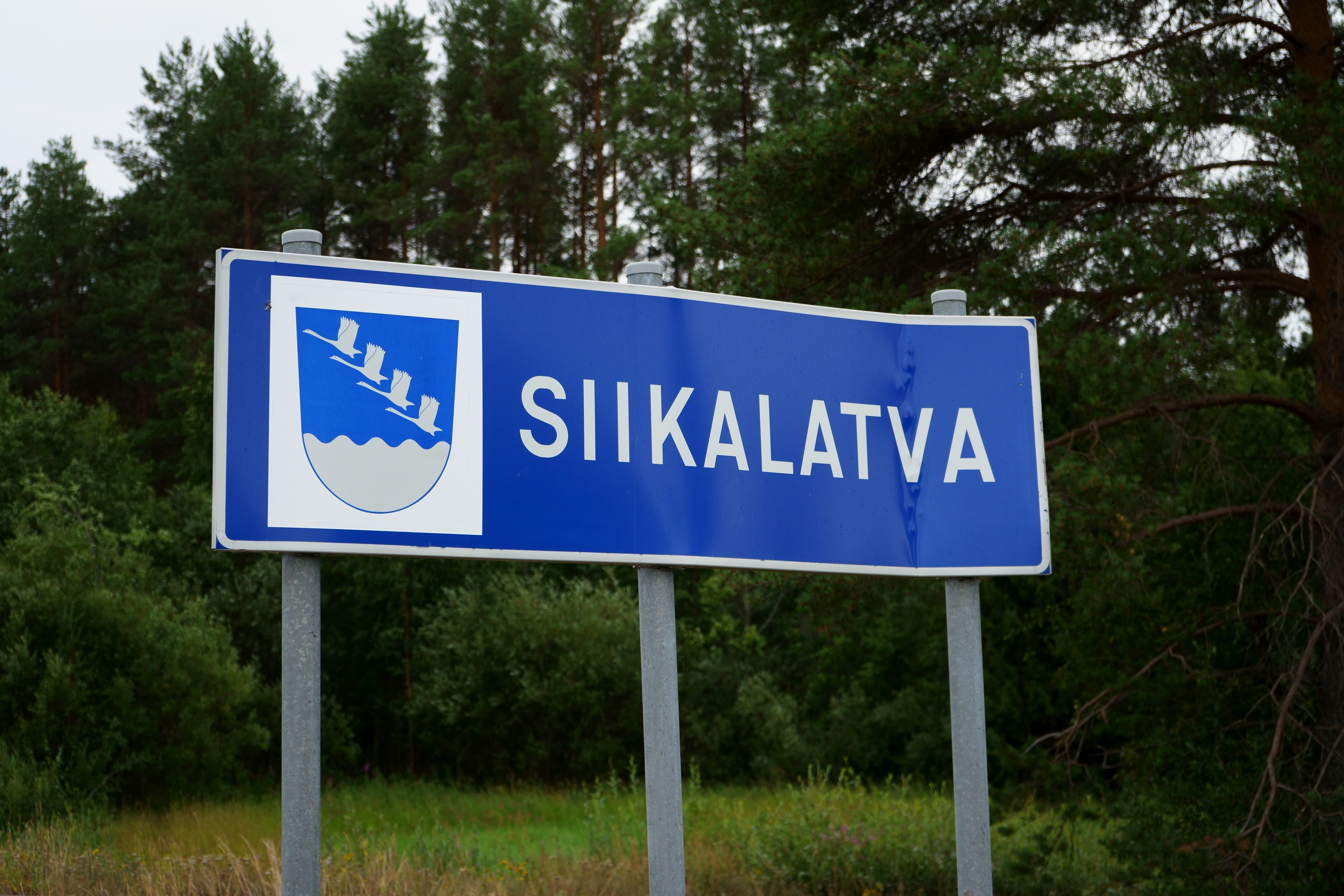

- Coat of arms

- Location of Siikalatva in Finland
- Interactive map of Siikalatva
- Coordinates: 64°16′N 025°52′E
- Country: Finland
- Region: North Ostrobothnia
- Sub-region: Siikalatva
- Charter: 2009
- Seat: Pulkkila

Government
  - Municipal manager: Pekka Iivari

Area (2018-01-01)
  - Total: 2,229.20 km^{2} (860.70 sq mi)
  - Land: 2,173.26 km^{2} (839.10 sq mi)
  - Water: 58.78 km^{2} (22.70 sq mi)
  - Rank: 28th largest in Finland

Population (2025-12-31)
  - Total: 4,861
  - Rank: 168th largest in Finland
  - Density: 2.24/km^{2} (5.8/sq mi)

Population by native language
  - Finnish: 98% (official)
  - Others: 2%

Population by age
  - 0 to 14: 15.2%
  - 15 to 64: 53.4%
  - 65 or older: 31.3%
- Time zone: UTC+02:00 (EET)
  - Summer (DST): UTC+03:00 (EEST)
- Website: siikalatva.fi/en/

Siikalatva (pronounced [ˈsiːkɑˌlɑtʋɑ]) is a geographical area and a municipality of Finland. It lies 90 kilometres to the south of the city of Oulu and belongs to the North Ostrobothnia region.

Siikalatva has a population of approximately 6 000 and the municipality covers an area of 2,229.20 square kilometres (860.70 sq mi) of which 58.78 km^{2} (22.70 sq mi) is water.

Siikalatva consists of four former municipalities: Kestilä, Piippola, Pulkkila and Rantsila, that decided to merge into one in 2009. The merger was encouraged and also funded by the Finnish government, mainly due to the declining population and the indebted government of Rantsila. The geographical area had often been referred to as Siikalatva even in the times before the creation of the new municipality.

The seat of the local government is in the Pulkkila urban area. Representatives are elected to the municipal council every four years. The agrarian Centre Party has been dominant in Siikalatva for several decades, currently holding an absolute majority with 19 out of 27 seats. In the 2012 local elections the True Finns gained a total of five seats, becoming the second-largest party in the council.

In terms of the economy, Siikalatva has in the past relied on a strong agricultural sector. Even in 2012, it employed as much as 26,9% of the workforce. The services sector has become the largest employer with a share of 54,6%. Industries, such as the Ruukki factory in Pulkkila, provide jobs to 17,2% of the workforce. The unemployment rate was 10,9% in September 2012.

There are four Lutheran churches in Siikalatva. Also, the Conservative Laestadian revival movement has a great number of supporters in the area.

The coat of arms of Siikalatva was designed and introduced in 2009. The colours, blue and silver, follow the Northern Ostrobothnian tradition. The wave pattern symbolises the river Siikajoki that flows throughout the municipality, and the swans represent the four former municipalities.

== Notable people ==
- Yrjö Halonen (1862–1941)
- Ilmari Kianto (1874–1970)
- Heikki Huttunen (1880–1947)
- T. I. Itkonen (1891–1968)
- Pentti Haanpää (1905–1955)
- Tapio Junno (1940–2006)
- Jouko Hassi (born 1959)
