= Ullava =

Former municipality of Finland

Coordinates: 63°42′25″N 23°53′35″E

Location of Ullava in Finland

Coat of arms of Ullava

Ullava is a former municipality of Finland. Ullava was consolidated with the city of Kokkola on January 1, 2009.

It is located in the province of Western Finland and is part of the Central Ostrobothnia region. The former municipality had a population of 1,037 (2003) and covered an area of 177.03 km² of which 14.35 km² was water. The population density was 6.4 inhabitants per km².

The former municipality was unilingually Finnish.
