= Pulkkila =

- Village, former municipality
- Pulkkilan kunta Pulkkila kommun
- Coat of arms

- Location of Pulkkila in Finland
- Coordinates: 64°16′N 025°52′E
- Country: Finland
- Region: North Ostrobothnia
- Sub-region: Siikalatva sub-region
- Charter: 1867
- Consolidated: 2009

Area
  - Total: 411.23 km^{2} (158.78 sq mi)
  - Land: 381.4 km^{2} (147.3 sq mi)
  - Water: 29.83 km^{2} (11.52 sq mi)

Population (2015-12-31)
  - Total: 792
  - Density: 2.08/km^{2} (5.38/sq mi)
- Time zone: UTC+2 (EET)
  - Summer (DST): UTC+3 (EEST)

Pulkkila is a former municipality and a village located in Northern Finland. Pulkkila is the administrative center of the municipality of Siikalatva and belongs to the region of North Ostrobothnia.

The village is located 90 kilometres (56 mi) south from Oulu and 250 kilometres (160 mi) north from Jyväskylä. Pulkkila has 792 inhabitants and the village is unilingually Finnish.

Pulkkila is best known for its metal industry and the artificial lake of Uljua.

Pulkkila was an independent municipality until it was consolidated with Kestilä, Piippola and Rantsila on 1 January 2009 to form a new municipality of Siikalatva.

== Notable persons from Pulkkila ==
- Pentti Haanpää, writer
- T. I. Itkonen
- Ilmari Kianto, writer
