= Western Finland Province =

Western Finland Länsi-Suomen lääni (Finnish) Västra Finlands län (Swedish)
- Coat of arms

- Map of Western Finland Province (2000)
- Coordinates: 62°N 24°E
- Country: Finland
- Established: September 1, 1997
- Abolished: January 1, 2010
- Capital: Turku
- Largest city: Tampere

Government
  - Governor: Rauno Saari

Area
  - Total: 74,185 km^{2} (28,643 sq mi)

Population (December 31, 2009)
  - Total: 1,889,542
  - Density: 25.471/km^{2} (65.969/sq mi)
- Time zone: UTC+2 (EET)
  - Summer (DST): UTC+3 (EEST)
- ISO 3166 code: LS
- NUTS code: 19

Western Finland (Finnish: Länsi-Suomen lääni, Swedish: Västra Finlands län) was a province of Finland from 1997 to 2009. It bordered the provinces of Oulu, Eastern Finland and Southern Finland. It also bordered the Gulf of Bothnia towards Åland. Tampere was the largest city of the province.

== History ==
On September 1, 1997 the Province of Turku and Pori, the Province of Vaasa, the Province of Central Finland, the northern parts of the Province of Häme and the western parts of the Mikkeli Province were joined to form the then new Province of Western Finland.

All the provinces of Finland were abolished on January 1, 2010.

== Administration ==
The State Provincial Office was a joint regional administrative authority of seven ministries. The State Provincial Office served at five localities; the main office was placed in Turku, and regional service offices were located in Jyväskylä, Tampere, Vaasa, and Pori. Approximately 350 persons worked at the State Provincial Office. The agency was divided into eight departments.

== Regions ==
Western Finland was divided into seven regions:

- South Ostrobothnia (Etelä-Pohjanmaa / Södra Österbotten)
- Ostrobothnia (Pohjanmaa / Österbotten)
- Pirkanmaa (Pirkanmaa / Birkaland)
- Satakunta (Satakunta / Satakunda)
- Central Ostrobothnia (Keski-Pohjanmaa / Mellersta Österbotten)
- Central Finland (Keski-Suomi / Mellersta Finland)
- Finland Proper (Varsinais-Suomi / Egentliga Finland)

== Municipalities in 2009 (cities in bold) ==
Western Finland was divided into 142 municipalities in 2009.

- **Akaa**
- **Alajärvi**
- **Alavus**
- Aura
- Eura
- Eurajoki
- Evijärvi
- Halsua
- Hankasalmi
- **Harjavalta**
- Himanka
- Honkajoki
- **Huittinen**
- Hämeenkyrö
- **Ikaalinen**
- Ilmajoki
- Isojoki
- Isokyrö
- **Jakobstad**
- Jalasjärvi
- Joutsa
- Juupajoki
- **Jyväskylä**
- Jämijärvi
- **Jämsä**
- **Kaarina**
- Kangasala
- **Kankaanpää**
- Kannonkoski
- **Kannus**
- Karijoki
- Karstula
- Karvia
- **Kaskinen**
- **Kauhajoki**
- **Kauhava**
- Kaustinen
- **Keuruu**
- Kihniö
- Kiikoinen
- Kimitoön
- Kinnula
- Kivijärvi
- **Kokemäki**
- **Kokkola**
- Konnevesi
- Korsholm
- Korsnäs
- Koski Tl
- **Kristinestad**
- Kronoby
- Kuhmalahti
- Kuhmoinen
- Kuortane
- **Kurikka**
- Kustavi
- Kylmäkoski
- Kyyjärvi
- Köyliö
- Laihia
- **Laitila**
- Lappajärvi
- **Lapua**
- Larsmo
- Laukaa
- Lavia
- Lempäälä
- Lestijärvi
- Lieto
- **Loimaa**
- Luhanka
- Luvia
- Malax
- Marttila
- Masku
- Merikarvia
- Multia
- Muurame
- Mynämäki
- **Mänttä-Vilppula**
- **Naantali**
- Nakkila
- **Nokia**
- Noormarkku
- Nousiainen
- **Nykarleby**
- Närpes
- Oravais
- Oripää
- **Orivesi**
- **Paimio**
- **Parkano**
- Pedersöre
- Perho
- Petäjävesi
- Pihtipudas
- Pirkkala
- Pomarkku
- **Pori**
- Punkalaidun
- Pyhäranta
- Pälkäne
- Pöytyä
- **Raisio**
- **Rauma**
- Ruovesi
- Rusko
- **Saarijärvi**
- **Salo**
- **Sastamala**
- Sauvo
- **Seinäjoki**
- Siikainen
- Soini
- **Somero**
- Säkylä
- Taivassalo
- **Tampere**
- Tarvasjoki
- Teuva
- Toholampi
- Toivakka
- **Turku**
- Töysä
- **Ulvila**
- Urjala
- Uurainen
- **Uusikaupunki**
- **Vaasa**
- **Valkeakoski**
- Vehmaa
- Vesilahti
- Veteli
- **Viitasaari**
- Vimpeli
- **Virrat**
- Vähäkyrö
- **Väståboland**
- Vörå-Maxmo
- **Ylöjärvi**
- **Ähtäri**
- **Äänekoski**

== Former municipalities (disestablished before 2009) ==
- Alahärmä
- Alastaro
- Askainen
- Dragsfjärd
- Halikko
- Houtskär
- Iniö
- Jurva
- Jyväskylän mlk
- Jämsänkoski
- Karinainen
- Kiikala
- Kimito
- Kisko
- Kiukainen
- Kodisjoki
- Korpilahti
- Korpo
- Kortesjärvi
- Kullaa
- Kuorevesi
- Kuru
- Kuusjoki
- Kälviä
- Lappi
- Lehtimäki
- Leivonmäki
- Lemu
- Lohtaja
- Loimaan kunta
- Luopioinen
- Längelmäki
- Maxmo
- Mellilä
- Merimasku
- Mietoinen
- Mouhijärvi
- Muurla
- Mänttä
- Nagu
- Nurmo
- Pargas
- Perniö
- Pertteli
- Peräseinäjoki
- Piikkiö
- Pylkönmäki
- Rymättylä
- Sahalahti
- Sumiainen
- Suodenniemi
- Suolahti
- Suomusjärvi
- Särkisalo
- Toijala
- Ullava
- Vahto
- Vammala
- Vampula
- Velkua
- Viiala
- Viljakkala
- Vilppula
- Västanfjärd
- Vörå
- Ylihärmä
- Ylistaro
- Yläne
- Äetsä

== Governors ==
- Heikki Koski 1997–2003
- Rauno Saari 2003–2009

== Heraldry ==
The coat of arms of Western Finland was composed of the arms of Finland Proper, Satakunta and Ostrobothnia.
