= Karinainen =

Former municipality of Finland

Coordinates: 60°40′N 022°46′E

Coat of arms of Karinainen

Karinainen is a former municipality of Finland. It was merged to Pöytyä in the beginning of 2005.

It was located in the province of Western Finland and was part of the Southwest Finland region.

The municipality was unilingually Finnish.
