= Rauman maalaiskunta =

Former municipality of Finland

Coordinates: 61.1314°N 21.5794°E

Rauman maalaiskunta (the rural municipality of Rauma, often abbreviated Rauman mlk) is a former municipality of Finland. It was annexed to Rauma on 1 January 1993. The population of the municipality at the time of annexation was about 9,000. The municipality was originally formed in 1476 when a border was drawn between the town of Rauma and the surrounding countryside. The townspeople had seafaring rights, which the country dwellers lacked. Between the 17th century and early 19th century, customs fees were levied on goods passing either to or from the town, and even a border wall existed. A place in Rauma is still called "Porintulli" (Customs of Pori) – a place for the customs on the road to Pori.
