= Särkisalo =

Särkisalo Särkisalo – Finby
- Former municipality
- Särkisalon kunta Finby kommun
- Coat of arms

- Interactive map of Särkisalo
- Location within Southwest Finland Location within Finland Location within Europe
- Country: Finland
- Province: Western Finland
- Region: Southwest Finland
- Sub-region: Salo
- Merged with Salo: January 1, 2009

Government
  - City manager: Paavo Karila

Area
  - Total: 82.85 km^{2} (31.99 sq mi)
  - Land: 81.79 km^{2} (31.58 sq mi)
  - Water: 1.06 km^{2} (0.41 sq mi)
  - Rank: 405th

Population (2003)
  - Total: 723
  - Rank: 420th
  - Density: 8.84/km^{2} (22.9/sq mi)
- −2.8 % change
- Time zone: UTC+2 (EET)
  - Summer (DST): UTC+3 (EEST)
- Official languages: Finnish
- Urbanisation: 0.0%
- Unemployment rate: 10.5%
- Climate: Dfb
- Website: http://www.sarkisalo.fi/

Särkisalo (Finnish pronunciation: [ˈsærkiˌsɑlo]; Swedish: Finby) is a former municipality of Finland, located mostly on Särkisalo island. It was consolidated with Salo on January 1, 2009. Before the merger it's neighbouring municipalities were Ekenäs, Kimito, Perniö and Västanfjärd.

It is located in the province of Western Finland and is part of the Southwest Finland region. The municipality had a population of 710 (2004-12-31) and covered an area of 82.85 km² (excluding sea) of which 1.06 km² is inland water. The population density was 8.68 inhabitants per km².

The municipality was bilingual, with majority being Finnish and minority Swedish speakers.
