= Kestilä =

- Village, former municipality
- Kestilän kunta Kestilä kommun
- Coat of arms

- Location of Kestilä in Finland
- Coordinates: 64°21′N 026°17′E
- Country: Finland
- Region: North Ostrobothnia
- Sub-region: Siikalatva sub-region
- Charter: 1867
- Consolidated: 2009

Area
  - Total: 606.53 km^{2} (234.18 sq mi)
  - Land: 601.44 km^{2} (232.22 sq mi)
  - Water: 5.09 km^{2} (1.97 sq mi)

Population (2015-12-31)
  - Total: 536
  - Density: 0.891/km^{2} (2.31/sq mi)
- Time zone: UTC+2 (EET)
  - Summer (DST): UTC+3 (EEST)

Kestilä is a village and former municipality of Finland. It is located in the province of Oulu and is part of the North Ostrobothnia region.

Established in 1867, the population was 536 as of 31 December 2015. The municipality covered an area of 606.53 km^{2} (234.18 sq mi) of which 5.09 km^{2} (1.97 sq mi) is water.

The municipality was unilingually Finnish.

The municipality was consolidated with Piippola, Pulkkila and Rantsila on 2009-01-01 to form a new municipality of Siikalatva.
