= Vahto =

- Former municipality
- Vahdon kunta Vahto kommun
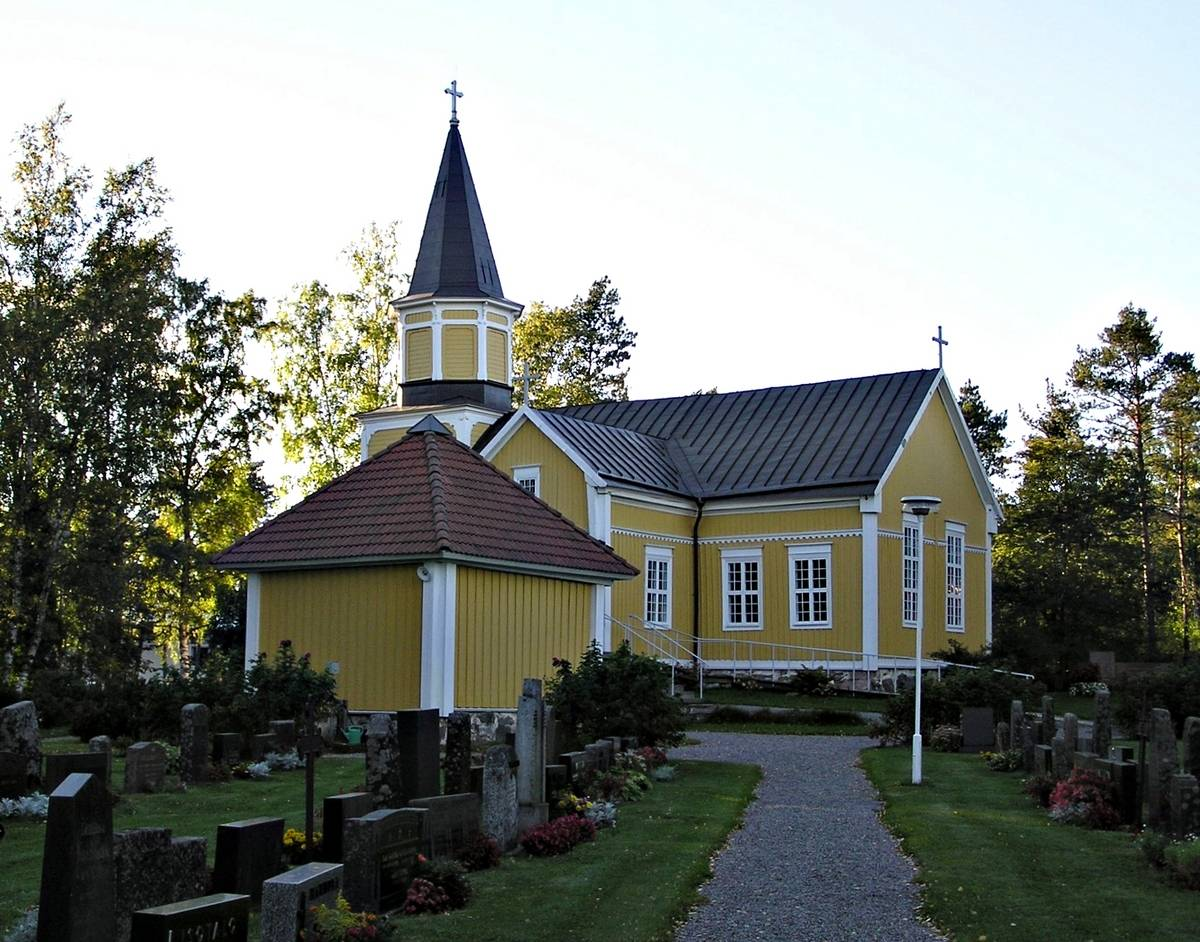
- Vahto church

- Coat of arms

- Coordinates: 60°36′35″N 022°18′25″E
- Country: Finland
- Province: Western Finland
- Region: Southwest Finland
- Sub-region: Turku
- Merged with Rusko: January 1, 2009

Government
  - City manager: Riitta Pahikkala

Area
  - Total: 77.10 km^{2} (29.77 sq mi)
  - Land: 77.08 km^{2} (29.76 sq mi)
  - Water: 0.02 km^{2} (0.0077 sq mi)
  - Rank: 407th

Population (2003)
  - Total: 1,859
  - Rank: 358th
  - Density: 24.12/km^{2} (62.46/sq mi)
- +0.8 % change
- Time zone: UTC+2 (EET)
  - Summer (DST): UTC+3 (EEST)
- Official languages: Finnish
- Urbanisation: 66.0%
- Unemployment rate: 7.6%
- Website: www.vahto.fi

Vahto (Finnish pronunciation: [ˈʋɑhto]) is a former municipality of Finland. It was consolidated with Rusko on January 1, 2009.

It is located in the province of Western Finland and is part of the Southwest Finland region. The municipality had a population of 1,876 (2004-12-31) and covered an area of 77.10 km^{2} of which 0.02 km^{2} is water. The population density was 24.34 inhabitants per km^{2}.

Vahto was one of the 18 municipalities in the Turku region, and due to its close proximity to the center of Turku (about 20 km), it may also be considered part of the Turku metropolitan area. In the north, Vahto shared a common boundary mark with seven other municipalities. This famous site, called Kuhankuono in Finnish, is also a pre-historical border mark between Southwest Finland and the other Finnish provinces.

The municipality was unilingually Finnish.
