= Ruukki =

- Former municipality
- Ruukin kunta Ruukki kommun
- Coat of arms

- Location of Ruukki in Finland
- Coordinates: 64°39′50″N 025°06′05″E
- Country: Finland
- Region: North Ostrobothnia
- Charter: 1973
- Consolidated: 2007

Area
  - Total: 772.58 km^{2} (298.29 sq mi)
  - Land: 766.79 km^{2} (296.06 sq mi)
  - Water: 5.79 km^{2} (2.24 sq mi)

Population (2006-12-31)
  - Total: 4,505
  - Density: 5.875/km^{2} (15.22/sq mi)
- Time zone: UTC+2 (EET)
  - Summer (DST): UTC+3 (EEST)

Ruukki is a former municipality of Finland.

It is located in the province of Oulu and is part of the North Ostrobothnia region. The municipality had a population of 4,505 (31 December 2006) and covered an area of 772.58 square kilometres (298.29 sq mi) of which 5.79 km^{2} (2.24 sq mi) is water. The population density was 5.88 inhabitants per square kilometre (15.2/sq mi).

The municipality was unilingually Finnish.

In 2007 municipality of Ruukki joined together with Siikajoki.
