= Naantalin maalaiskunta =

Former municipality of Finland

Naantalin maalaiskunta (Nådendals landskommun in Swedish), or the rural municipality of Naantali, as distinct from the city of Naantali, is a former municipality in Finland. The municipality was located in south-western Finland, surrounding the city of Naantali, and composed of rural and suburban areas around it, mostly on the island of Luonnonmaa and to the north of the city. By the 1960s, the city had expanded well outside its administrative boundaries, and rural municipality's population had exceeded that of the city. The rural municipality, which also suffered from financial difficulties, was annexed into the city of Naantali in 1964.
