= Loimaan kunta =

- Former municipality
- Loimaan kunta Loimaa kommun
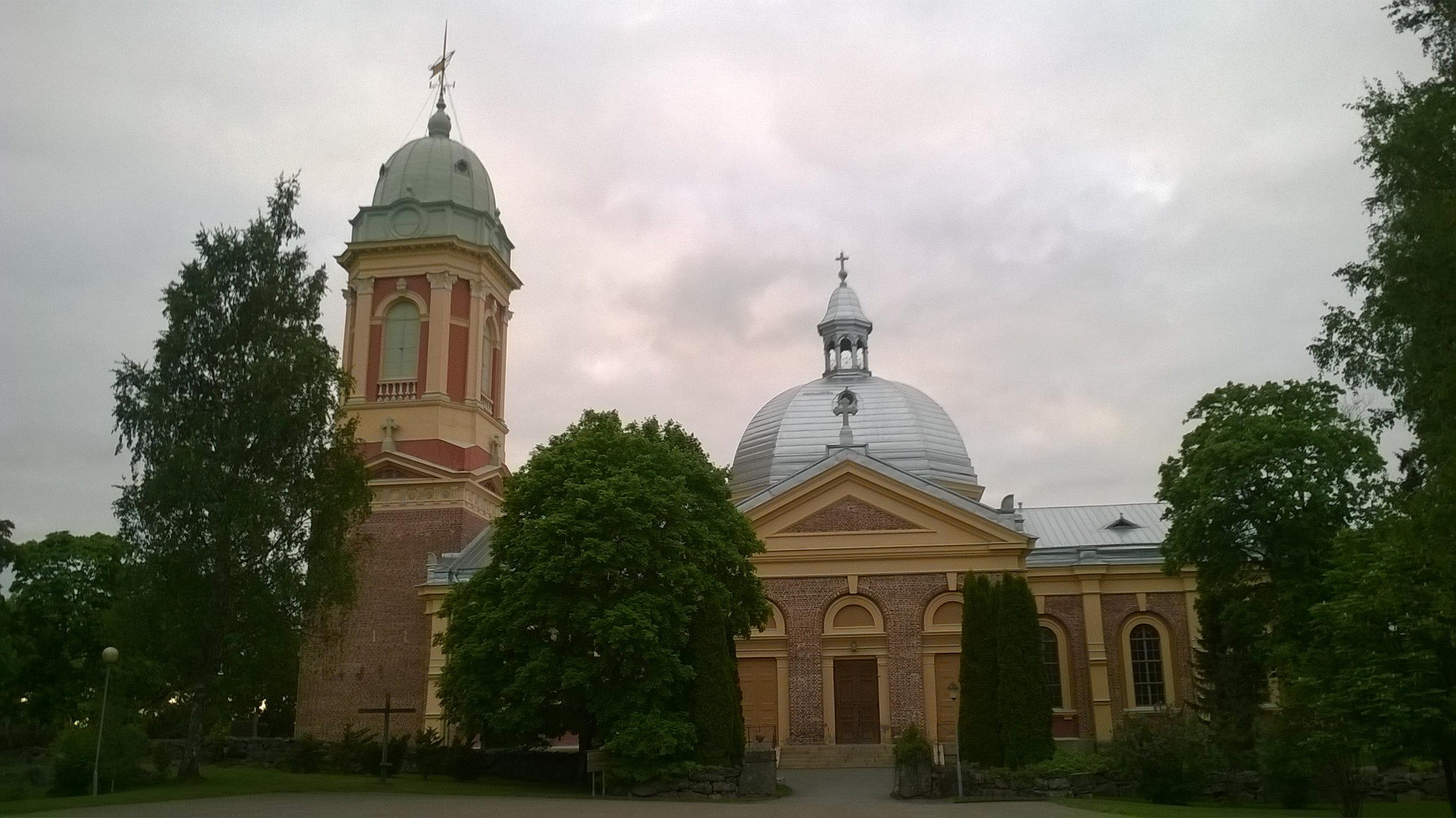
- Church of Loimaa Proper

- Coat of arms

- Location of Loimaan kunta in Finland
- Coordinates: 60°52′04″N 022°59′06″E
- Country: Finland
- Province: Western Finland
- Region: Southwest Finland
- Sub-region: Loimaa sub-region
- Merged with Loimaa: January 1, 2005
- Seat: Hirvikoski

Area
  - Total: 435.6 km^{2} (168.2 sq mi)
  - Land: 434.08 km^{2} (167.60 sq mi)
  - Water: 1.52 km^{2} (0.59 sq mi)

Population (2002)
  - Total: 5,991
  - Rank: 179th
  - Density: 13.80/km^{2} (35.75/sq mi)
- −1.0 % change
- Time zone: UTC+2 (EET)
  - Summer (DST): UTC+3 (EEST)
- Official languages: Finnish
- Climate: Dfc

Loimaan kunta (Finnish pronunciation: [ˈloi̯mɑːŋˈkuntɑ]; Swedish: Loimaa kommun; literally "Municipality of Loimaa", until 1921 Loimaa, 1921–1977 Loimaan maalaiskunta; Swedish: Loimaa landskommun) is a former municipality of Finland. It was merged to the town of Loimaa in the beginning of 2005.

It was located in the province of Western Finland and was part of the Southwest Finland region. The municipality had a population of 5,909 (2003) and covered an area of 434.08 km^{2} of which 1.52 km^{2} was water. The population density was 13.6 inhabitants per km^{2}.

The municipality was unilingually Finnish.
