= Rantsila =

- Village, former municipality
- Rantsilan kunta Rantsila kommun
- Coat of arms

- Location of Rantsila in Finland
- Coordinates: 64°30′N 025°39′E
- Country: Finland
- Region: North Ostrobothnia
- Sub-region: Siikalatva sub-region
- Charter: 1867
- Consolidated: 2009

Area
  - Total: 746.64 km^{2} (288.28 sq mi)
  - Land: 732.23 km^{2} (282.72 sq mi)
  - Water: 14.41 km^{2} (5.56 sq mi)

Population (2015-12-31)
  - Total: 812
  - Density: 1.11/km^{2} (2.87/sq mi)
- Time zone: UTC+2 (EET)
  - Summer (DST): UTC+3 (EEST)

Rantsila (Swedish: Rantsila, also Frantsila) is a village and former municipality of Finland.

It is located in the province of Oulu and is part of the North Ostrobothnia region. The village had a population of 812 (31 December 2015), while the former municipality covered a land area of 732.23 km^{2} (282.72 sq mi). The population density was 2.73 inhabitants per square kilometre (7.1/sq mi). The municipality was unilingually Finnish.

During the Finnish War (1808–1809), which resulted in Finland being ceded to the Russian Empire, the last battle engaged within Finland was held in the Kerälä village of Rantsila, between the Russian and Swedish-Finnish armies. General J.A. Sandels was perhaps the most highly respected commander of the Finnish troops, and in honour of him and his noble and highly renowned horse Bijou, an equestrian statue was erected in the center of Rantsila in 1989.

The municipality was consolidated with Kestilä, Piippola and Pulkkila on 1 January 2009 to form a new municipality of Siikalatva.
