= Lappi, Finland =

Former municipality of Finland

Coordinates: 61°06′05″N 21°50′40″E

Location of Lappi in Finland

Lappi (Finnish pronunciation: [ˈlɑpːi]) is a former municipality of Finland.

A former coat of arms of the Lappi municipality

It was located in the province of Western Finland and was part of the Satakunta region. The municipality had a population of 3,236 (2003) and covered an area of 213.27 km^{2} of which 7.24 km^{2} is water. The population density was 15.2 inhabitants per km^{2}.

The municipality was unilingually Finnish. UNESCO World Heritage Site Sammallahdenmäki is located in Lappi.

Lappi was consolidated with the city of Rauma on 1 January 2009, was officially disbanded and since has been considered a neighborhood.

== See also ==
- List of former municipalities of Finland
