= Västanfjärd =

Former municipality of Finland

- Former municipality
- Västanfjärds kommun Västanfjärdin kunta
- Coat of arms

- Location of Västanfjärd in Finland (2008).
- Interactive map of Västanfjärd
- Location within Southwest Finland Location within Finland Location within Europe
- Country: Finland
- Province: Western Finland
- Region: Southwest Finland
- Sub-region: Åboland
- Consolidated into Kimitoön: 2009

Government
  - Municipal manager: Stefan Långström

Area
  - Total: 96.62 km^{2} (37.31 sq mi)
  - Land: 95.93 km^{2} (37.04 sq mi)

Population (2004-12-31)
  - Total: 812
  - Density: 8.46/km^{2} (21.9/sq mi)
  - Urbanisation: 0.0%
- Time zone: UTC+02:00 (EET)
  - Summer (DST): UTC+03:00 (EEST)
- Official languages: Swedish, Finnish
- Unemployment rate: 3.1%

Västanfjärd is a former municipality of Finland. On 1 January 2009, it was consolidated with Dragsfjärd and Kimito to form the new municipality of Kimitoön.

It is located in the province of Western Finland and is part of the Southwest Finland region. The municipality had a population of 812 (2004-12-31) and covered an area of 96.62 km^{2} (excluding sea) of which 0.69 km^{2} is inland water. The population density was 8.46 inhabitants per km^{2}.

The municipality was bilingual, with majority being Swedish and minority Finnish speakers.
