= Vihanti =

- Former municipality
- Vihannin kunta Vihanti kommun
- Coat of arms

- Location of Vihanti in Finland
- Coordinates: 64°29′N 025°00′E
- Country: Finland
- Region: North Ostrobothnia
- Sub-region: Raahe sub-region
- Charter: 1865

Government
  - Municipal manager: Leena Mikkola-Riekkinen

Area
  - Total: 489.64 km^{2} (189.05 sq mi)
  - Land: 484.71 km^{2} (187.15 sq mi)
  - Water: 4.93 km^{2} (1.90 sq mi)

Population (31 December 2012)
  - Total: 3,020
- Time zone: UTC+2 (EET)
  - Summer (DST): UTC+3 (EEST)
- Website: www.vihanti.fi

Vihanti was a municipality of Finland. It was merged with the city of Raahe on 1 January 2013.

Vihanti is located in the North Ostrobothnia region. The municipality has a population of 3,020 (31 December 2012) and covers an area of 489.64 square kilometres (189.05 sq mi) of which 4.93 km^{2} (1.90 sq mi) is water. The population density is 6.231/km^{2} (16.137/sq mi).

The municipality is unilingually Finnish.
