= Siikajoki =

- Municipality
- Siikajoen kunta Siikajoki kommun
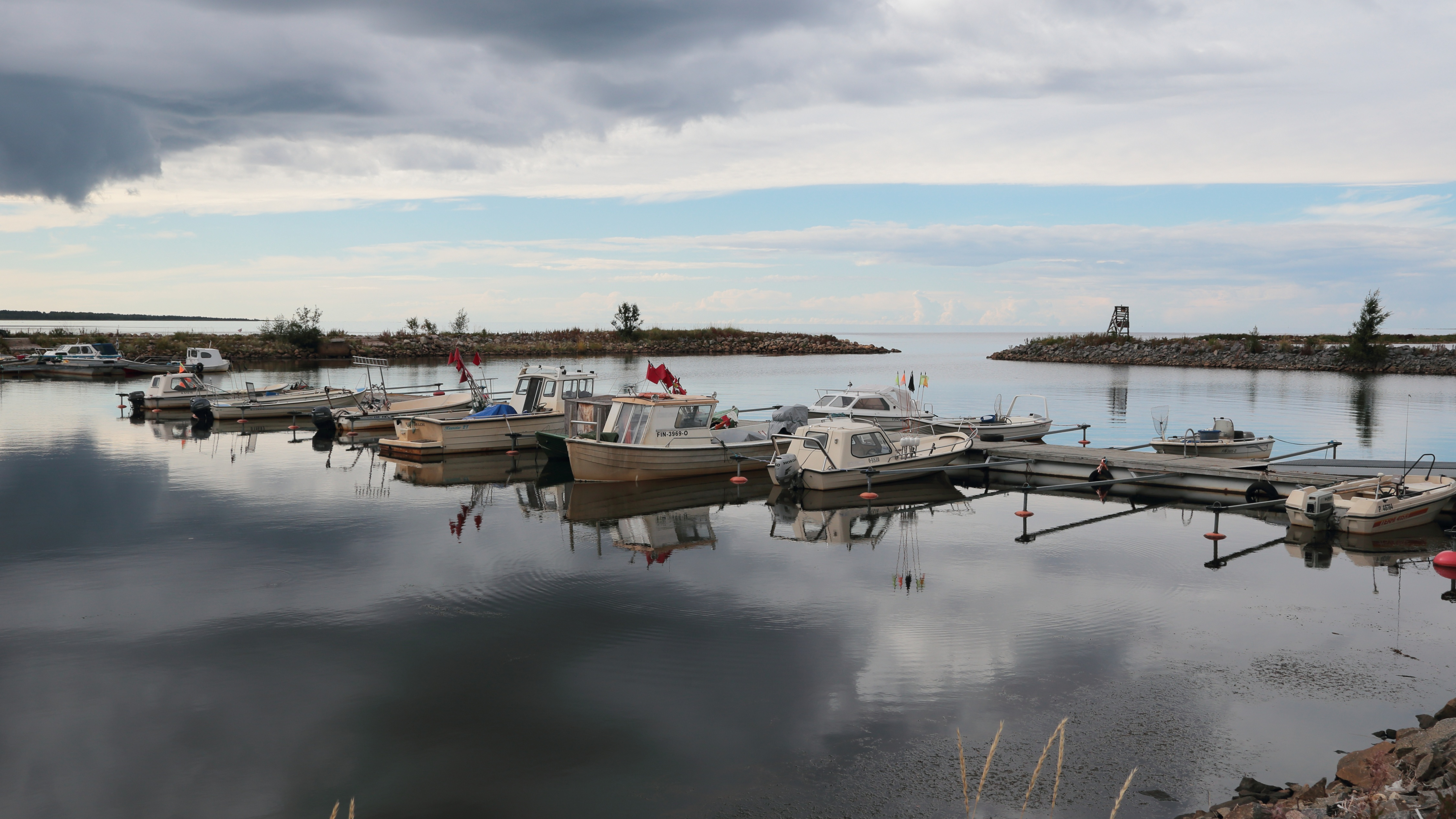

- Coat of arms

- Location of Siikajoki in Finland
- Interactive map of Siikajoki
- Coordinates: 64°40′N 025°06′E
- Country: Finland
- Region: North Ostrobothnia
- Sub-region: Raahe
- Charter: 1868
- Seat: Ruukki

Government
  - Municipality manager: Kaisu Tuomi

Area (2018-01-01)
  - Total: 1,653.89 km^{2} (638.57 sq mi)
  - Land: 1,055.46 km^{2} (407.52 sq mi)
  - Water: 601.94 km^{2} (232.41 sq mi)
  - Rank: 74th largest in Finland

Population (2025-12-31)
  - Total: 4,723
  - Rank: 170th largest in Finland
  - Density: 4.47/km^{2} (11.6/sq mi)

Population by native language
  - Finnish: 98.2% (official)
  - Others: 1.8%

Population by age
  - 0 to 14: 21.2%
  - 15 to 64: 54.1%
  - 65 or older: 24.7%
- Time zone: UTC+02:00 (EET)
  - Summer (DST): UTC+03:00 (EEST)
- Website: www.siikajoki.fi

Siikajoki is a municipality of Finland. It is part of the North Ostrobothnia region. The municipality has a population of 4,723 (31 December 2025) and covers an area of 1,653.89 square kilometres (638.57 sq mi) of which 601.94 km^{2} (232.41 sq mi) is water. The population density is 4.47 inhabitants per square kilometre (11.6/sq mi). Neighbour municipalities are Hailuoto, Liminka, Lumijoki, Raahe and Siikalatva.

The municipality is unilingually Finnish.

== History ==
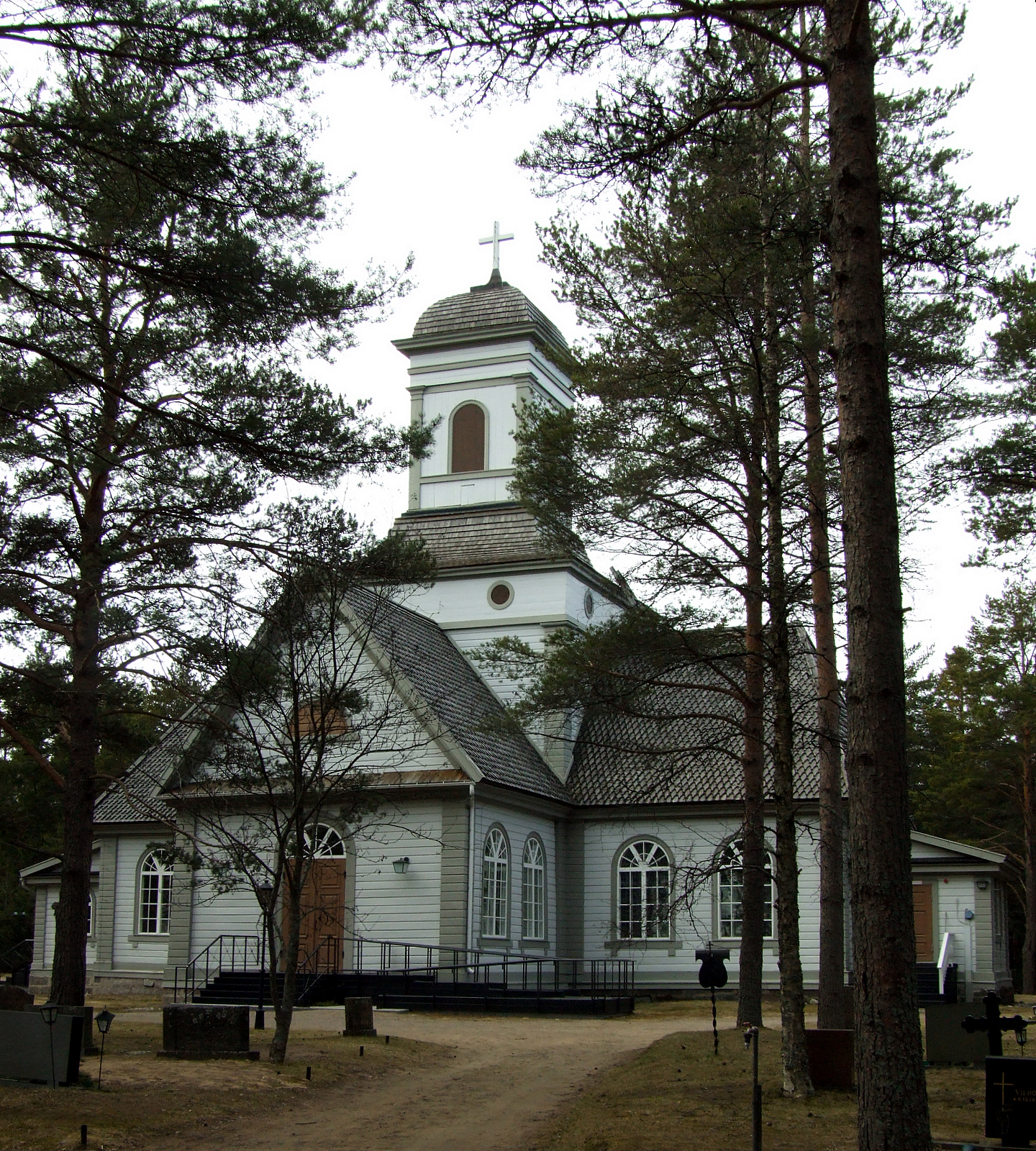
Siikajoki Church

The current municipality of Siikajoki consists of three previous municipalities of Paavola and Revonlahti, that were merged into the municipality of Ruukki in 1973, and the municipality of Siikajoki founded in 1868. The municipalities of Ruukki and Siikajoki were disbanded and replaced by the new municipality of Siikajoki on January 1, 2007.

== Settlements ==
- Luohuan Ylipää

== Notable people ==
- Matti Asunmaa (1921–1998)
- Väinö Huhtala (1935–2016)

== See also ==
- Battle of Siikajoki
- Battle of Revolax
