= Estonians in Finland =

Ethnic group in Finland

Eestlased Soomes / Soome eestlased Virolaiset Suomessa / Suomenvirolaiset

Total population
- 48,894 Estonian citizens; 48,495 Estonian speakers (2025)

Regions with significant populations
- Helsinki, Turku and Tampere regions & Lahti

Languages
- Estonian, Finnish

Religion
- Lutheranism, Orthodoxy, irreligious

Related ethnic groups
- Finns, Estonians, Baltic Finns, Finnic people

Estonians in Finland or Finnish Estonians (Estonian: Eestlased Soomes; Finnish: Suomen virolaiset) are people who originate from Estonia and who live in Finland. People can be born in Estonia, have Estonian ancestry and/or be citizens of Estonia. As of 2025, there were 45,604 people born in Estonia living in Finland. Similarly, the number of people with Estonian citizenship was 48,894. The number of people who spoke Estonian as their mother tongue was 48,495.

Finland has the largest Estonian community outside Estonia.

== History ==
The earliest known mention of Estonian migration to Finland comes from the 14th century, when it was mentioned that people had fled from the Bishopric of Ösel–Wiek to the towns of Turku and Viipuri or their surroundings. Place names containing the elements Est- and Viro- are found across the southern coast of Finland, the former in traditionally Swedish-speaking and the latter in Finnish-speaking areas. One of the earliest attested examples of such names is Virolahti, which was first mentioned in 1336 as Viirlax. These names may refer to contacts between the locals and Estonians, or even to Estonian settlement, though the latter is less likely. Some later names may be references to migrants from Swedish Estonia and Livonia, who were not necessarily ethnic Estonians, and may have included Estonian Swedes, Livonians and Latvians as well.

During the Great Northern War, Estonians came to Uusimaa as refugees, settling especially in Kirkkonummi, Pernå and Porvoo, later followed by more migrants coming to the area for various reasons, such as fleeing serfdom or searching for better fishing waters. A document of the (then mostly Swedish-speaking) Kirkkonummi parish assembly from 1795 mentions that the small Finnish-language congregation within the parish consisted mainly of Estonians. The island of Pirttisaari near Porvoo was mostly Estonian-speaking in the 18th and early 19th centuries.

In 1906, an Estonian community emerged in the village of Kabböle, part of the largely Swedish-speaking municipality of Pernå, after nine families from Kuusalu had bought land there. Due to mixed marriages and education in Swedish, the community began assimilating into the majority, and the third generation of Estonians in Kabböle was almost entirely Swedish-speaking.

Immigration from Estonia to Finland was low before 1990. After the collapse of the Soviet Union and Estonia's accession to the EU in 2004, emigration from Estonia to Finland increased rapidly.

The migration of Estonians peaked in 2012, when more than 6,000 Estonians emigrated to Finland. In 2017, however, net migration from Estonia was negative, as Estonians returned to their country. The reasons for this are rising salaries in Estonia and family ties. Nevertheless, the Estonian population is still growing, although at a much slower rate than before.

== Population by municipalities ==
Historical population
Year	Pop.	±% p.a.
1990	1,394	—
1995	8,710	+44.26%
2000	10,176	+3.16%
2005	15,336	+8.55%
2010	28,493	+13.19%
2015	48,087	+11.03%
2020	49,551	+0.60%
2025	48,495	−0.43%
Estonian speakers. Source: Statistics Finland

People born in Estonia and living in Finland, according to Statistics Finland.

Country of birth Estonia by municipality (2024)
Municipality	Population
Whole country	46,675
Helsinki	9,979
Vantaa	8,437
Espoo	5,560
Turku	1,626
Kerava	1,225
Nurmijärvi	1,099
Tampere	1,061
Tuusula	1,024
Kirkkonummi	997
Lahti	914
Vihti	597
Lohja	590
Järvenpää	587
Salo	569
Hyvinkää	478
Porvoo	474
Hämeenlinna	417
Sipoo	386
Kouvola	350
Kotka	328
Jyväskylä	284
Mäntsälä	258
Rauma	257
Pori	247
Riihimäki	245
Kuopio	228
Raisio	218
Kaarina	207
Heinola	182
Seinäjoki	173
Vaasa	173
Lappeenranta	172
Valkeakoski	171
Karkkila	165
Raseborg	161
Mikkeli	137
Siuntio	137
Orimattila	135
Laitila	133
Hollola	124
Oulu	122
Forssa	112
Loviisa	112
Nokia	112
Janakkala	109
Kangasala	104
Hamina	100
Loimaa	98
Paimio	98
Sastamala	93
Somero	88
Hausjärvi	87
Kauniainen	86
Lempäälä	86
Lieto	86
Naantali	85
Eura	83
Akaa	77
Pargas	76
Harjavalta	75
Kankaanpää	75
Kauhava	75
Pirkkala	75
Rovaniemi	75
Ylöjärvi	75
Kimitoön	69
Mariehamn	69
Uusikaupunki	66
Kurikka	64
Joensuu	63
Kärkölä	61
Kokkola	57
Imatra	56
Pöytyä	53
Ingå	52
Kokemäki	51
Jämsä	50
Loppi	50
Huittinen	49
Hanko	47
Pieksämäki	47
Alajärvi	46
Askola	46
Eurajoki	46
Iitti	45
Orivesi	45
Pornainen	43
Masku	42
Mänttä-Vilppula	42
Urjala	42
Asikkala	41
Jomala	41
Pälkäne	41
Savonlinna	40
Ulvila	40
Kauhajoki	39
Kristinestad	39
Jakobstad	39
Koski Tl	38
Ikaalinen	37
Lapua	37
Mäntyharju	37
Säkylä	36
Varkaus	36
Iisalmi	35
Siilinjärvi	35
Kajaani	34
Karvia	34
Nykarleby	34
Hattula	33
Lapinjärvi	33
Sysmä	31
Aura	30
Kemi	30
Mynämäki	30
Hämeenkyrö	29
Lapinlahti	29
Närpes	28
Vörå	28
Äänekoski	28
Keuruu	27
Parkano	27
Tornio	27
Joutsa	25
Joroinen	24
Juva	24
Pyhtää	24
Virrat	23
Kaustinen	22
Myrskylä	22
Nakkila	22
Raahe	22
Suonenjoki	22
Tammela	22
Vesilahti	22
Alavus	21
Ilmajoki	21
Isojoki	21
Jokioinen	21
Oripää	21
Evijärvi	20
Haapavesi	20
Laukaa	20
Korsholm	20
Nousiainen	20
Sotkamo	19
Teuva	18
Föglö	17
Kolari	17
Pedersöre	17
Sauvo	17
Vieremä	17
Hartola	16
Humppila	16
Kronoby	16
Padasjoki	16
Halsua	15
Kittilä	15
Kuortane	15
Laihia	15
Kiuruvesi	14
Taivassalo	14
Juuka	13
Muurame	13
Outokumpu	13
Kitee	12
Pukkila	12
Rautalampi	12
Sodankylä	12
Finström	11
Isokyrö	11
Kalajoki	11
Kannus	11
Muhos	11
Parikkala	11
Rusko	11
Virolahti	11
Kihniö	10
Kontiolahti	10
Kustavi	10
Kuusamo	10
Marttila	10
Ruokolahti	10
Saarijärvi	10

People with Estonian citizenship living in Finland according to Statistics Finland.

Citizens of Estonia by municipality (2024)
Municipality	Population
Whole country	50,444
Helsinki	9,761
Vantaa	9,445
Espoo	6,038
Turku	1,515
Kerava	1,414
Nurmijärvi	1,414
Tuusula	1,211
Kirkkonummi	1,144
Tampere	915
Lahti	898
Vihti	713
Salo	666
Lohja	665
Järvenpää	643
Porvoo	579
Hyvinkää	543
Sipoo	454
Hämeenlinna	398
Kouvola	359
Kotka	330
Mäntsälä	317
Jyväskylä	263
Pori	263
Riihimäki	257
Kuopio	255
Rauma	230
Raisio	223
Lappeenranta	211
Valkeakoski	195
Laitila	190
Heinola	188
Karkkila	188
Raseborg	187
Kaarina	182
Vaasa	175
Loviisa	167
Siuntio	164
Seinäjoki	161
Orimattila	160
Mikkeli	158
Forssa	156
Oulu	153
Loimaa	146
Hollola	144
Sastamala	138
Hamina	120
Paimio	115
Nokia	112
Janakkala	111
Somero	109
Kangasala	101
Eura	99
Harjavalta	93
Hausjärvi	93
Kankaanpää	89
Kauhava	89
Kauniainen	85
Uusikaupunki	85
Lieto	84
Huittinen	83
Lempäälä	83
Pargas	83
Kärkölä	80
Mariehamn	80
Akaa	77
Rovaniemi	76
Kokemäki	74
Kimitoön	73
Kurikka	73
Imatra	72
Ylöjärvi	70
Naantali	69
Joensuu	67
Ingå	66
Hanko	65
Kokkola	65
Pöytyä	65
Pirkkala	64
Eurajoki	60
Askola	57
Loppi	56
Pieksämäki	56
Lapinjärvi	55
Pornainen	55
Nykarleby	54
Alajärvi	52
Iitti	52
Jämsä	52
Orivesi	52
Iisalmi	49
Säkylä	49
Kristinestad	48
Ulvila	48
Mänttä-Vilppula	47
Asikkala	44
Hattula	44
Lapua	44
Savonlinna	44
Mäntyharju	43
Pälkäne	43
Siilinjärvi	43
Urjala	43
Varkaus	43
Kauhajoki	42
Karvia	40
Koski Tl	40
Parkano	40
Jakobstad	39
Ikaalinen	38
Kajaani	38
Masku	35
Äänekoski	35
Lapinlahti	34
Laukaa	34
Pyhtää	34
Vörå	33
Aura	32
Hämeenkyrö	32
Myrskylä	32
Närpes	32
Haapavesi	31
Joutsa	31
Mynämäki	30
Joroinen	29
Tammela	29
Virrat	29
Jomala	28
Raahe	28
Sotkamo	28
Sysmä	27
Tornio	27
Vieremä	27
Nakkila	26
Juva	25
Kemi	25
Alavus	24
Isojoki	24
Jokioinen	24
Kiuruvesi	24
Taivassalo	24
Evijärvi	23
Nousiainen	23
Oripää	23
Suonenjoki	23
Keuruu	22
Kronoby	22
Teuva	22
Föglö	21
Halsua	21
Ilmajoki	20
Kalajoki	20
Vesilahti	20
Kaustinen	19
Muhos	19
Pedersöre	18
Pukkila	18
Hartola	17
Humppila	17
Kitee	17
Kittilä	17
Kolari	16
Laihia	16
Muurame	16
Rautalampi	16
Ruokolahti	16
Isokyrö	15
Juuka	15
Kihniö	15
Kontiolahti	15
Finström	14
Kannus	14
Korsholm	14
Padasjoki	14
Saarijärvi	14
Sodankylä	14
Heinävesi	12
Marttila	12
Sauvo	12
Toholampi	12
Brändö	11
Kaskinen	11
Kustavi	11
Kuusamo	11
Kärsämäki	11
Outokumpu	11
Jämijärvi	10
Kempele	10
Kivijärvi	10
Kuortane	10
Lemland	10
Liperi	10
Parikkala	10
Siikalatva	10

People with Estonian as mother tongue living in Finland according to Statistics Finland.

Estonian speakers by municipality (2024)
Municipality	Population
Whole country	49,563
Helsinki	9,382
Vantaa	8,495
Espoo	5,640
Turku	1,490
Nurmijärvi	1,377
Kerava	1,317
Tuusula	1,200
Kirkkonummi	1,131
Tampere	953
Lahti	875
Salo	717
Vihti	698
Lohja	697
Järvenpää	632
Porvoo	615
Hyvinkää	583
Hämeenlinna	490
Sipoo	450
Kouvola	388
Kotka	342
Mäntsälä	332
Jyväskylä	305
Kuopio	285
Riihimäki	285
Pori	273
Rauma	234
Lappeenranta	220
Kaarina	210
Raseborg	208
Raisio	204
Heinola	194
Valkeakoski	192
Laitila	191
Oulu	187
Karkkila	186
Loviisa	180
Seinäjoki	178
Mikkeli	176
Orimattila	173
Forssa	172
Siuntio	162
Hollola	158
Vaasa	157
Loimaa	144
Sastamala	140
Hamina	122
Janakkala	121
Somero	117
Kangasala	114
Nokia	113
Paimio	107
Hausjärvi	97
Eura	94
Kankaanpää	91
Kauhava	91
Naantali	91
Akaa	90
Lempäälä	88
Kärkölä	87
Joensuu	86
Harjavalta	85
Kauniainen	85
Pargas	84
Lieto	82
Huittinen	80
Kimitoön	80
Uusikaupunki	80
Rovaniemi	79
Ylöjärvi	79
Mariehamn	76
Pirkkala	75
Kokkola	73
Kurikka	71
Kokemäki	69
Pöytyä	68
Jämsä	67
Hanko	66
Imatra	66
Loppi	66
Ingå	63
Askola	60
Eurajoki	58
Iisalmi	58
Pieksämäki	58
Nykarleby	57
Alajärvi	56
Pornainen	56
Lapinjärvi	55
Savonlinna	54
Orivesi	53
Säkylä	53
Iitti	52
Kristinestad	50
Asikkala	48
Kauhajoki	48
Mänttä-Vilppula	47
Pälkäne	47
Varkaus	46
Hattula	45
Jomala	45
Lapua	45
Siilinjärvi	45
Äänekoski	45
Koski Tl	44
Jakobstad	44
Ulvila	44
Urjala	44
Laukaa	42
Karvia	41
Lapinlahti	41
Mäntyharju	41
Parkano	40
Ikaalinen	39
Sysmä	39
Hämeenkyrö	37
Kajaani	37
Haapavesi	36
Mynämäki	36
Aura	35
Masku	34
Myrskylä	34
Alavus	33
Vörå	33
Tornio	32
Tammela	31
Joutsa	30
Juva	30
Nakkila	30
Ilmajoki	29
Joroinen	29
Kemi	29
Virrat	29
Jokioinen	28
Sotkamo	28
Keuruu	27
Närpes	27
Raahe	27
Suonenjoki	27
Vieremä	27
Isojoki	26
Pyhtää	26
Nousiainen	25
Kalajoki	24
Kaustinen	24
Kiuruvesi	24
Halsua	23
Laihia	23
Oripää	23
Taivassalo	23
Evijärvi	22
Föglö	22
Vesilahti	22
Kronoby	21
Teuva	21
Kittilä	20
Kannus	19
Pedersöre	19
Finström	18
Humppila	18
Kolari	18
Muhos	18
Pukkila	18
Isokyrö	17
Juuka	17
Kontiolahti	17
Saarijärvi	17
Sodankylä	17
Hartola	16
Kihniö	16
Kitee	16
Pyhäjoki	16
Ruokolahti	16
Kuortane	15
Kuusamo	15
Padasjoki	15
Heinävesi	14
Muurame	14
Sauvo	14
Virolahti	14
Jämijärvi	13
Liperi	13
Parikkala	13
Toholampi	13
Inari	12
Kempele	12
Kärsämäki	12
Marttila	12
Korsholm	12
Outokumpu	12
Rautalampi	12
Siikajoki	12
Kaskinen	11
Kustavi	11
Lemland	11
Lieksa	11
Luumäki	11
Pielavesi	11
Siikalatva	11
Kivijärvi	10
Nivala	10
Petäjävesi	10
Pyhäranta	10
Rautjärvi	10
Taipalsaari	10
Vehmaa	10
Ylivieska	10
Ähtäri	10

== Notable people ==
- Hans Kalm, soldier
- Hella Wuolijoki, writer
- Imbi Paju, journalist, writer and filmmaker
- Kalevi Kotkas, athlete
- Mikael Gabriel, rapper
- Mäkki, rapper
- Siim Liivik, ice hockey player
- Sofi Oksanen, writer
- Tiina Lillak, athlete

== See also ==
- Estonia–Finland relations
- Estonian diaspora
- Immigration to Finland
