= Helsinki (Taivassalo) =

Helsinki Swedish: Helsinge
- Village in Taivassalo
- Location in Finland
- Coordinates: 60.6072482°N 21.4450425°E
- Country: Finland
- Province: Western Finland
- Region: Finland Proper
- Sub-region: Vakka-Suomi
- Municipality: Taivassalo

Population (2012-6-19)
  - Total: 6
- Time zone: UTC+2 (EET)
  - Summer (DST): UTC+3 (EEST)

Helsinki (Swedish: Helsinge) is a small village in Taivassalo, Finland.

== Geography ==
Helsinki is located in the western part of Taivassalo, close to the insular municipality of Kustavi. Helsinki is also close to Lokalahti, located to its north. Helsinki can be accessed via the road 12244, a branch of the regional road 196.

== Name ==
While the name of Helsinki is not directly connected to that of Finland's capital Helsinki, both names may be derived from the name of Hälsingland in Sweden. The Swedish name Helsinge was also the name of the old Helsingin pitäjä, nowadays known as Vantaa.

The village is also known as Helsinginranta or Helsinginkylä, usually to distinguish it from the much more significant city.

== History ==
The village's name may suggest that its first settlers were Swedes from Hälsingland. The village was first mentioned in 1386 as Helsingaby. It was originally a prebend (tenure farm) of the abbey in Naantali.

Helsinki became somewhat significant in the 17th century as the Stockholm–Turku mail route passed through it. Helsinki was the road's entry and exit point for the entire Finnish mainland. Later on, a ferry connecting Helsinki to Kustavi was still the only road connection between Kustavi and the mainland until the ferry was relocated to Kaitainen in 1954. The Kaitainen bridge was built in 1982.

On September 26, 1808, during the Finnish War, 3,400 soldiers led by Gustaf Olof Lagerbring landed in Helsinki. Two days after the landing, they were defeated in Viiainen by Russian soldiers led by Pyotr Bagration.

Nowadays Helsinki is a village of only 6 permanent inhabitants, however the village contains many summer cottages, increasing its population during the summer.

== Sights ==
Parts of the old mail route have been preserved in the area, including the dock on the Tylpänniemi. It is classified as a cultural site of national significance.
