= Battle of Lokalaks =

1808 battle of the Finnish War

- Part of the Finnish War
Date	17–18 September 1808
Location	Lokalaks (Lokalahti), Finland
Result	Russian victory

Belligerents
Sweden	Russian Empire

Commanders and leaders
Albrekt von Lantinghausen	(Russian Empire) Pyotr Bagration

Strength
2,500–3,000; 4 guns	? 5 guns

Casualties and losses
140 killed, wounded and captured	200 killed, wounded and captured

The Battle of Lokalaks (or Lokalax) was fought between Swedish and Russian forces at Lokalaks (Lokalahti), Finland on 17–18 September 1808 during the Finnish War.

== Background ==
Shortly after the Battle of Oravais the Swedish king, Gustav IV Adolf, decided to land a force of 4,000 men under general Albrekt von Lantinghausen on the coast of Nystad, to cut-off the Russian connection between that town and Åbo. It was also meant to join forces with parts of Eberhard von Vegesack's army which was supposed to land at Björneborg (Pori), but instead went as far north as Kristinestad where it landed on 28 August; this made cooperation between the two forces difficult.

== Battle ==
Nonetheless, the Swedish force under Lantinghausen landed at Lokalaks on 17 September with less than 3,000 men of his initial force; it was badly equipped and with inadequate ammunition. Ready to receive them was the Russian commander Pyotr Bagration with a contingent (perhaps 1,200 men) and 5 guns. After Lantinghausen had landed he made little progress in advancing and after reaching Lokalaks Church he was attacked by the Russians, at 6:00 PM. The fighting remained mild and continued for two hours before it was stopped due to the dark. On 6:00 AM the next day the Russians attacked again while Lantinghausen remained passive and made no effort to counterattack; after six hours Bagration attacked both Swedish flanks and Lantinghausen made the decision to embark his ships and sail away.

== Aftermath ==
The Swedes had lost 140 men in the battle while the Russians had lost 200. Lantinghausen was soon stripped of command by Gustav IV Adolf who replaced him with Gustaf Olof Lagerbring before the Landing at Helsinki several days later.

== Swedish regiments and losses ==
- Swedish command Staff; 1 killed
- Svea Life Guards (1 battalion); 4 killed, 6 wounded and 1 captured — 11
- Swedish Guard Regiment (1 battalion); 1 killed, 7 wounded and 1 captured — 9
- Finnish Guard Regiment (1 battalion); 3 killed, 22 wounded and 3 captured — 28
- Jägers (1 battalion, emerged from other regiments); 4 wounded and 1 captured — 5
- Kronoberg Infantry Regiment (2 battalions); 16 killed, 58 wounded and 9 captured — 83
- Västmanland auxiliary reserve (1 battalion); 1 killed and 1 wounded — 2
- Life Guards of Horse (2 squadrons); —
- Svea Artillery Regiment (4 guns); 1 killed

In total: 2,500—3,000 men and 4 guns; 140 killed, wounded and captured.
