= Honkilahti =

Coordinates: 60°58′N 022°07′E

- Former municipality
- Honkilahden kunta Honkilahti kommun
- Coat of arms
- Interactive map of Honkilahti
- Country: Finland
- Region: Satakunta
- Sub-region: Rauma sub-region
- Time zone: UTC+2 (EET)
  - Summer (DST): UTC+3 (EEST)
- Climate: Dfb

Honkilahti (Swedish: Honkilahti, also Honkilax) is a village and a former municipality in Finland, part of Eura since 1970.

== History ==
The commune of Honkilahti was founded in 1904 when it was separated from Eura. Honkilahti was merged back with Eura in 1970. Honkilahti has a wooden church which "Tuomas Samuelinpoika Rahvenius" designed in 1759. It lies on the northern side of Koskeljärvi. Before Honkilahti were discontinued, it had many kilometers the coastline from Pyhäjärvi. The population of Honkilahti was at its peak in 1957 when there were 1887 inhabitants.

The neighbouring municipalities of Honkilahti were Eura, Hinnerjoki, Laitila, Karjala, Mynämäki, Yläne and Säkylä.

The arms of Honkilahti were designed by Gustaf von Numers and it was registered in 1951.

== People born in Honkilahti ==
- Pentti Eskola (1883–1964), geologist
- Walter Kuusela (1903–1985), politician
- Vihtori Viitanen (1863–1918), politician
