= Alastalon salissa =

Finnish novel

- Author: Volter Kilpi
- Language: Finnish
- Publisher: Otava
- Publication date: 1933
- Publication place: Finland
- Media type: Print (Hardback)
- Pages: 956 pp
- OCLC: 645285328

Alastalon salissa (In the Alastalo Parlor) is a 1933 landmark Finnish novel by Volter Kilpi. The two-volume novel covers a period of only six hours, written partly in a stream-of-consciousness style similar to James Joyce’s Ulysses—though some Finnish critics have argued that the stream-of-consciousness passages are neither as radical nor as extensive as Joyce's, and actually Kilpi's novel is closer in style and spirit to Marcel Proust's In Search of Lost Time.

== Plot summary ==
The central narrative of Alastalon salissa describes a meeting of a group of wealthy men from Kustavi in the Archipelago Sea in Western Finland one October Thursday in the 1860s. The men are trying to decide whether to invest in a shipbuilding venture proposed by one of their number, Herman Mattsson, master of Alastalo. The novel's length stems from numerous digressions, internal monologues and a detailed accounting of each character's thought processes. In one famous scene, a character's journey to the mantelpiece to fetch a pipe is told in over seventy pages.

== Translations ==
No complete English translation has been published; but in the early 1990s, the editors of Books From Finland asked David Barrett (1914–1998) to translate Kilpi’s Alastalo into English; after translating just a few paragraphs Barrett declined the invitation:

Reluctantly (I really have tried) I have been driven to conclude that Alastalon salissa is untranslatable, except perhaps by a fanatical Volter Kilpi enthusiast who is prepared to devote a lifetime to it. To mention only one of the difficulties, there is no English equivalent to the style of the Finnish ‘proverbs’ (real or imaginary) with which the main character Alastalo’s thoughts are so thickly larded. Add to this the richness and, yes, eccentricity, of Kilpi’s vocabulary, and the unfamiliarity of much of the subject-matter, centred as it is on the interests of a sea-going community that hardly exists any longer, even on the islands, and you have a text that is full of pitfalls for the translator. As for the humour, I’m sorry to say that it depends so much on the idiom and presentation that it doesn’t come over at all. If I did any more, I’m afraid it would just have to be a laborious paraphrase, and I don’t think I’m capable of making it effective, or even readable, in English.

Barrett's translation of the "untranslatable" opening pages of the novel are also published there. For a translation of a page and a half from later in the first chapter of the novel—the first major stream-of-consciousness passage—see pp. 247–49 of Douglas Robinson's Aleksis Kivi and/as World Literature.

Thomas Warburton has translated the novel into Swedish as I salen på Alastalo – en skärgårdsskildring (1997). Stefan Moster published a German translation Im Saal von Alastalo in 2021.

== See also ==
- Finnish literature
