= Karjala =

Karjala may refer to:

- Karjala (beer), a Finnish lager-type beer manufactured by the Hartwall brewery.
- Karelia (Karjala in Finnish and Karelian), an area in Northern Europe
  - Karjala (historical province of Finland), partly ceded to Russia in 1940
  - Republic of Karelia, a federal subject of Russia
- Karjala (municipality), a former Finnish municipality in Southwest Finland
- Finnish gunboat Karjala, a Filin-class guard ship
- Finnish corvette Karjala, a Turunmaa-class gunboat

== People with the surname ==
- Dennis Karjala (1939–2017), American law professor
