= Vakka-Suomi =

Vakka-Suomi sub-region Vakka-Suomen seutukunta
- Sub-region
- Country: Finland
- Region: Southwest Finland
- Capital: Uusikaupunki

Population
  - Total: 30,017
- Time zone: UTC+2 (EET)
  - Summer (DST): UTC+3 (EEST)

Vakka-Suomi is a sub-region within the Southwest Finland region. It consists of the town of Uusikaupunki and its surrounding municipalities of Kustavi, Laitila, Mietoinen, Mynämäki, Pyhäranta, Taivassalo and Vehmaa. This sub-region is in name only, without official government. The composition of the area is disputable, as communities within it have been and are merged into each other, even into ones that are not seen to belong into Vakka-Suomi. For example, Kalanti and Lokalahti are no longer their own municipalities, but a part of Uusikaupunki.

The name of the region originates from the 19th century, when a significant export of the region was vakkas. A vakka is a commonly a lightweight container made out of wood, generally carryable by two hands. A vakka usually has a flat bottom and a round shape. It has an easily fitting lid that has a locking mechanism and is commonly without hinges.

== Municipalities ==
Coat of arms	Municipality	Population	Land area (km^{2})	Density (/km^{2})	Finnish speakers	Swedish speakers	Other speakers
Coat of arms of Kustavi	Kustavi	972	166	6	93 %	2 %	5 %
Coat of arms of Laitila	Laitila	8,400	532	16	86 %	0 %	14 %
Coat of arms of Pyhäranta	Pyhäranta	1,892	144	13	97 %	1 %	3 %
Coat of arms of Taivassalo	Taivassalo	1,707	140	12	91 %	1 %	8 %
Coat of arms of Uusikaupunki	Uusikaupunki	14,783	503	29	90 %	0 %	10 %
Coat of arms of Vehmaa	Vehmaa	2,263	189	12	92 %	1 %	7 %
	Total	30,017	1,674	18	89 %	0 %	10 %
