= Aakula =

- Language: Finnish

Origin
- Meaning: "Augie's farm", derived from Aaku ("Augie", short for August) and -la ("place of, esp. farm")
- Region of origin: Finland

Other names
- Variant form: Aaku

Aakula is a Finnish surname meaning "Augie's farm". Notable people with the surname include:

- Eemeli Aakula (1879–1955), Finnish politician
- Pekka Aakula (1866–1928), Finnish politician
