= Leningradin ja Turun ystävyyden patsas =

Coordinates: 60°27′13.4″N 22°15′37.6″E

Leningradin ja Turun ystävyyden patsas (in Finnish) Staty över vänskapen mellan Leningrad och Åbo (in Swedish)
- Artist: Antti Louhisto
- Year: 1967–1968
- Type: Bronze
- Location: Turku

The Statue of Friendship Between Leningrad and Turku (Finnish Leningradin ja Turun ystävyyden patsas, Swedish Staty över vänskapen mellan Leningrad och Åbo) is a statue located in Puolalanpuisto park in Turku, Finland. It was erected 1967-1968 and revealed on May 19, 1969. The statue was erected in honour of the 15th town twinning anniversary between Turku and Leningrad (now Saint Petersburg).

The statue depicts four figures, three men and a woman, greeting and embracing each other.

Leningradin ja Turun ystävyyden patsas is made of bronze and stands 2.5 metres high. The base is made of red granite, mined from Vehmaa, and stands half a metre high.
