= Karjala, Finland =

Karjala
- Former municipality
- Karjalan kunta Karjala kommun
- Coat of arms

- Location of Karjala in Finland
- Coordinates: 60.7862021°N 22.0739244°E
- Country: Finland
- Province: Turku and Pori Province
- Region: Finland Proper
- Established: 1906
- Merged into Mynämäki: 1977
- Seat: Karjalan kirkonkylä

Area
  - Land: 101.8 km^{2} (39.3 sq mi)

Population (1976-12-31)
  - Total: 902

Karjala is a former municipality of Finland in the former Turku and Pori Province, now in Finland Proper. It was consolidated with Mynämäki in 1977.

== Geography ==
Karjala bordered Mynämäki, Mietoinen, Eura, Yläne and Laitila. Until 1970, it bordered Hinnerjoki and Honkilahti instead of Eura.

Karjala is relatively forested in comparison to Mynämäki and especially Mietoinen, which are mostly former seafloor converted into farmland. Nearly 60 % of Karjala's land area is forested.

=== Villages ===
- Haankylä
- Haanperä
- Kalela
- Karjala
- Karppinen
- Ketelinen
- Laajoki
- Sairinen
- Salavainen
- Suojoki
- Suutila
- Tallola
- Vehmalainen
- Vuoloinen
- Kaipiala

== Name ==
The name of Karjala may be related to the word karja (cattle), most likely indirectly, possibly through the village name Karjakoski in Mynämäki. The name is not related to that of Karelia, also known as Karjala in Finnish.

The municipality has also been known as Karjalankorpi. Mynämäenkarjala was used by outsiders, but it was seen as derogatory by the locals. It is occasionally also called Karjala Tl (compare Koski Tl) to distinguish it from the region of Karelia. A person from Karjala is called karjalalainen, while a Karelian is called karjalainen.

== History ==
The actual borders of Karjala, Mynämäki and Mietoinen had multiple exclaves. These types of borders were usually caused by the Great Partition (Isojako).

The area was initially a part of the Mynämäki parish. The upper reaches of the rivers Mynäjoki and Laajoki were settled in the 13th century. Karjala was first mentioned in 1402. It became a chapel community in 1797. The chapel community of Vehmalainen was merged into Karjala in 1860.

Karjala became an independent parish and municipality in 1906. In the 1960s, it was the least industrialized municipality in Finland Proper, 3/4 of its inhabitants practiced agriculture or forestry. Karjala was consolidated with Mynämäki in 1977.

== Services ==
=== School ===
Karjala has a school for grades 1-6 (ala-aste). The school was renovated in 2006.

== Notable people ==
- Evert Eloranta, politician
