= Eero Kilpi =

Finnish actor

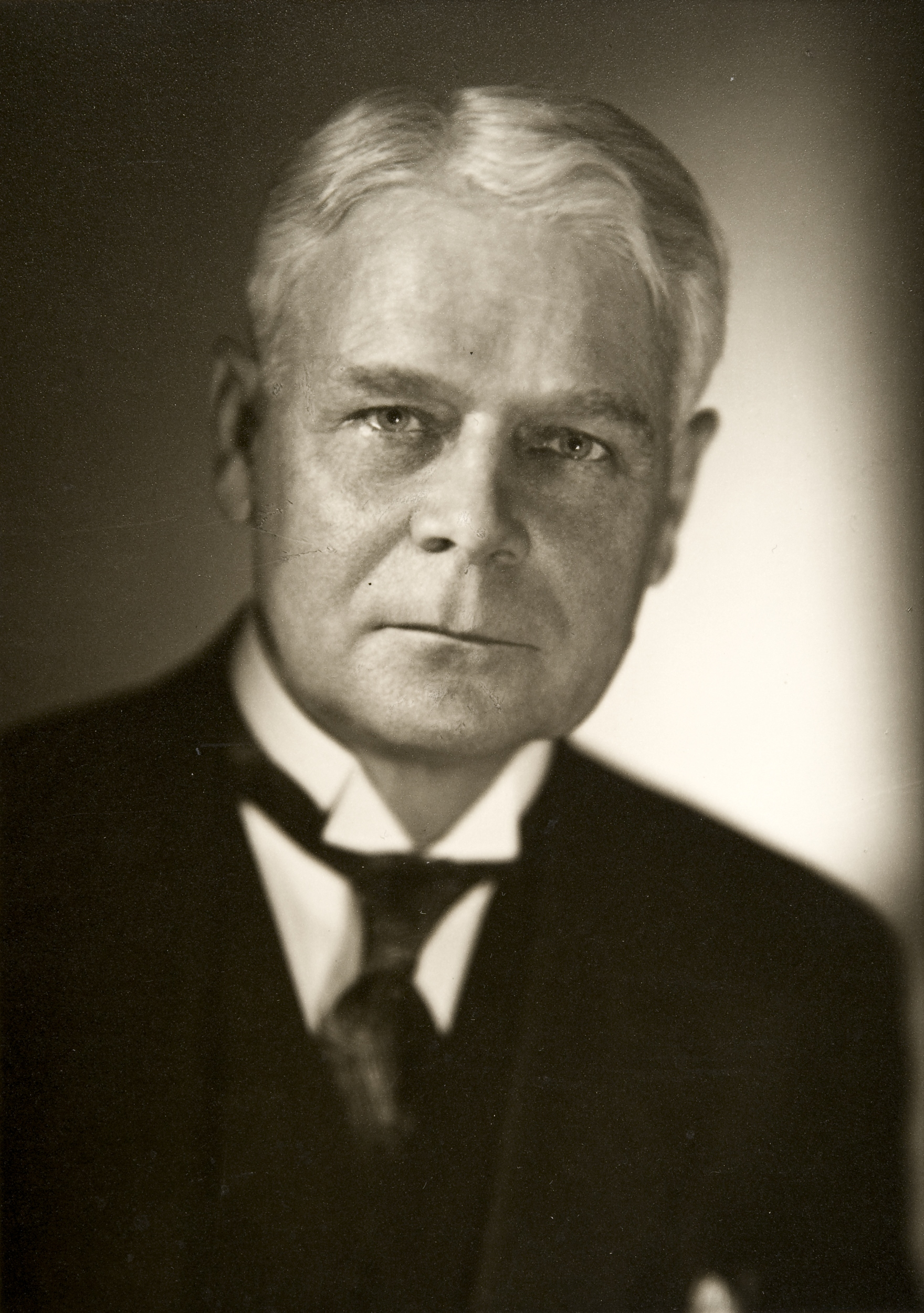
- Kilpi in the 1930s
- Born: Eero Abraham Ericsson; 23 January 1882; Kustavi, Grand Duchy of Finland, Russian Empire
- Died: 29 November 1954 (aged 72); Helsinki, Finland
- Occupation: Actor
- Years active: 1905–1954
- Spouse: Tekla Sofia Kilpi
- Relatives: Volter Kilpi (brother)

Eero Abraham Kilpi (born Eero Abraham Ericsson; 23 January 1882 – 29 November 1954) was a Finnish stage, film and radio actor whose career spanned nearly fifty years.

== Early life ==
Eero Kilpi was born Eero Abraham Ericsson. He was the son of a sea captain, David Ericsson (1843–1919) and Anna Lucina Ericsson (née Abrahamsson, 1846–1917). He was the second youngest child of five sons: Volter Adalbert Kilpi (1874–1939), Väinö Kilpi (1877–1880), Anto Ferdinand Kilpi (1879–1932) and Sulo Taavetti Kilpi (1882–1954). His family later changed their surname from Ericsson to Kilpi. His older brother Volter would become a prominent Finnish writer. He initially studied at the Finnish Business College before deciding to become an actor.

== Stage and film career ==
Kilpi was engaged at the Finnish National Theatre from 1903 to 1949 where, during his long engagement, he performed in such varied roles as the title role of Josef Julius Wecksell's tragedy Daniel Hjort, Friedrich Schiller's Don Carlos, Shakespeare's Hamlet and Aleksis Kivi's Nummisuutarit (The Cobblers on the Heath), among many others. During the early 1900s, he performed in Denmark, Germany, France and Austria and served as the theater director of the Finnish Drama Institute, the predecessor of Finnish Theatre School, from 1924 to 1940.

During the early 1900s, Kilpi began appearing in Finnish silent films. He made his screen debut in the 1907 Louis Sparre and Teuvo Puro directed film Salaviinanpolttajat (The Moonshiners); Finland's first fictional motion picture. Kilpi would appear in approximately thirty films during his career, transitioning to the sound film era with ease. In the 1930s and 1940s, he also began appearing as a voice actor on YLE, the Finnish Broadcasting Company. His last film role was in the 1954 comedy Minäkö isä! directed by Valentin Vaala.

== Personal life ==
Eero Kilpi was married to Tekla Sofia Kilpi (née Carlson) from 1923 until his death in 1954 in Helsinki.
