= Vihtori Viitanen =

Finnish politician (1863–1918)

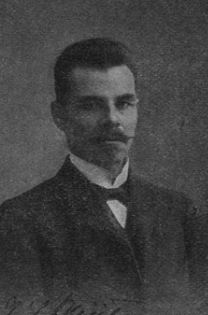
Image of Vihtori Viitanen

Viktor (Vihtori) Viitanen (18 November 1863, Honkilahti - 1918) was a Finnish prison officer and politician. He was a member of the Parliament of Finland from 1907 to 1908, representing the Social Democratic Party of Finland (SDP).
