= Signilskär =

Island of the archipelago of Åland

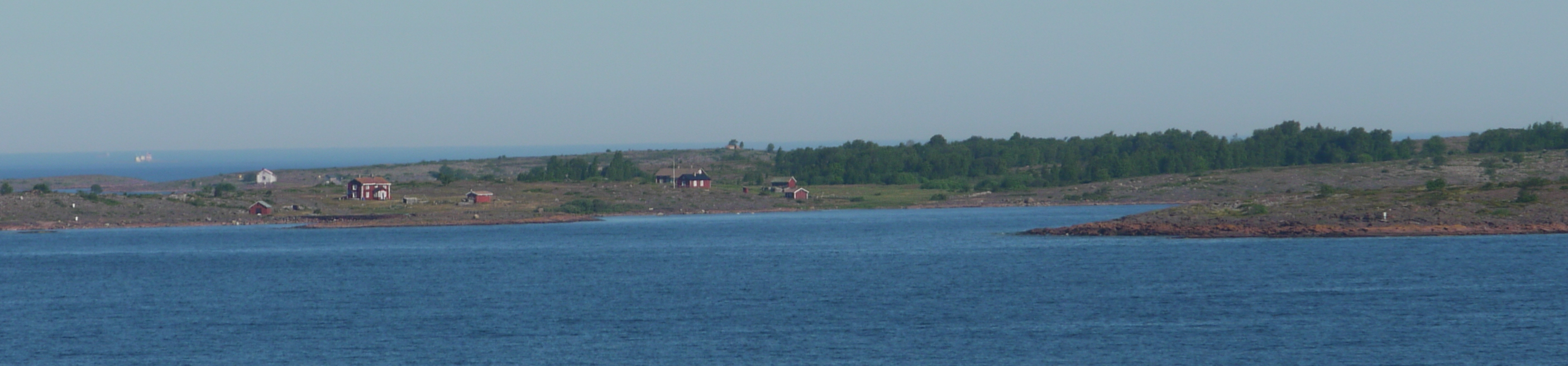
- Signilskär, as seen from a passing ferry
- Interactive map of Signilskär

Geography
- Coordinates: 60.197128°N 19.3339°E

Administration
- Finland
- Island: Åland

Demographics
- Population: 0

Signilskär is one of the westernmost islands in Finland, being part of the archipelago of Åland in the Gulf of Bothnia. The island, along with Katajaluoto, Hamnskär, and North and South Västerskär, makes up part of the municipality of Hammarland. Beyond Signilskär is Märket, the westernmost point of Finland.

== History ==
Signilskär was first described in a manuscript from 1538 as ‘Sancte Signilskär’. There is no clear explanation of its name, but various sources tell of the island being used as a place of refuge by some Irish and English princesses. There also might have been a faithful man named Signil who lived on the island long ago.

Its geographic location between Finland and Sweden has always played an important role. On Signilskär lies a chapel, dating back to the middle ages. At one excavation site, coins from the 12th century were found, giving a hint to when this building was first constructed. The chapel was later restored in 1948.

In 1545, Gustav Vasa made an appeal to the citizens of Eckerö to make it a protected port and a shelter to sailors. From that moment on, the island was most likely permanently settled, with the exception of two wars in the 18th century when it was under Russian occupation. The inhabitants mostly subsisted on seal hunting, fishing, and accommodating visitors. Moreover, they were exempted from taxes and military enlistment.

=== Mail route ===
Signilskär received an important function in 1638 when a mail route was implemented between Sweden and Finland, which then belonged to the Swedish Empire. Crews navigating the dangerous passage between Sweden and Åland in frail postal boats could end up facing heavy weather, in which case they could find shelter on Signilskär and wait for conditions to improve.

=== Optical telegraph ===
A thirty meter tall optical telegraph was constructed in 1796 which connected Åland to the Swedish telegraph network. The most important function it served was being able to quickly receive war threats from the east (namely Russia). For that reason this installation was destroyed on March 16, 1809 by Russian soldiers during the Finnish War.

== Current situation ==
Nowadays, Signilskär has no permanent residents. Next to the chapel living quarters there are still a few buildings, one of which used to be a bird ringing station. Further on lie the remains of an old windmill and a shallow port that was constructed in 1846. On the neighboring island of Katajaluoto there is a mansion in good condition from 1867 with an built-in, but no longer active, lighthouse.

== Wildlife ==
Signilskär and the nearby islands are quite full of deciduous forests, fields as well as a marsh. Unique plants can be found on the island, as the fragrant orchid and the wall rue. The islands are frequently visited by birdwatchers, both in the Spring and during Winter. Among other types of birds, some Sea eagles have been spotted here. The surrounding waters are home to a population of approximately 200 seals, including ringed seals as well as gray seals.

=== Protected status ===
In 1994, the approximately 22,000 ha large Signilskär-Märket area, along with 62 other areas, were included in a list of protected coastline and sea areas by the Baltic Sea. This location is also a Natura 2000 site and has been a part of the Ramsar List, which ensures the protection of treasured parks, since 1974.

The islands border on two busy shipping routes in which oil spills and major disturbances of animals tend to occur, a potential threat to the wildlife, especially in the breeding season.

== Tourism ==
There are no regular ferry trips to Signilskär, but local organizations offer charter trips.
