= Kabböle =

- Village
- Location in Uusimaa
- Coordinates: 60.314°N 26.080°E
- Country: Finland
- Region: Uusimaa
- Sub-region: Loviisa sub-region
- Town: Loviisa
- Former municipality: Pernå
- Time zone: UTC+2 (EET)
  - Summer (DST): UTC+3 (EEST)

Kabböle is a village in Loviisa, Finland, located on the territory of the former municipality of Pernå. It is notable for having had an Estonian community, with its first members settling there in 1906 and later assimilating into the Swedish-speaking population of Pernå.

== Geography ==
Kabböle is located in the southwestern part of modern Loviisa, on the tip of a peninsula surrounded by the Gulf of Finland. The main road to the village is the highway 1580, which connects it to the Finnish national road 7 further north.

== History ==
Kabböle was first mentioned in 1545. According to Lars Huldén, the name is derived from either a shortening of an Old Swedish given name Katilbjörn or the Swedish word kabbe 'wooden club'. An alternative name, Enböle, is attested in 1598 and 1599. The word en in Swedish can mean either 'one', which Huldén took as a reference to a "lone" farm not part of a village, or 'juniper'.

The Estonian community of Kabböle emerged in 1906, when nine families from Kuusalu bought land and established farms in the village. While some of the initial families returned to Estonia soon after, other families would take their place. By the end of World War I, there were some 70–80 Estonians living in the village. After World War II, the community began assimilating into the majority population due to mixed marriages becoming more common and Swedish being the language of education in the village school. While the second generation of Estonians in Kabböle was bilingual, the third generation was almost entirely Swedish-speaking.

During prohibition in Finland in the early 20th century, alcohol from Estonia was smuggled in through Kabböle, earning it the nickname "Kanisterböle".

In 2008, some residents of Kabböle as well as nearby Sarvsalö and Isnäs made a plea to the Ministry of the Interior to transfer the three villages to Porvoo, as most villagers rely on the city's services. In 2010, the entirety of Pernå was consolidated with Loviisa instead, along with the municipalities of Liljendal and Ruotsinpyhtää.

== Notable people ==
- Aleksander Warma (1890–1970), head of the Estonian government-in-exile
