= Lokalahti =

- Former municipality
- Lokalahden kunta Lokalax kommun
- Coat of arms

- Location of Lokalahti in Finland
- Coordinates: 60.6823576°N 21.4644839°E
- Country: Finland
- Province: Turku and Pori Province
- Region: Finland Proper
- Established: 1905
- Merged into Uusikaupunki: 1981

Area
  - Land: 107.6 km^{2} (41.5 sq mi)

Population (1980-12-31)
  - Total: 1,065

Lokalahti (Swedish: Lokalax) is a village and a former municipality of Finland in the former Turku and Pori Province, now in the Finland Proper region. It was consolidated with the town of Uusikaupunki in 1981.

== Geography ==
Lokalahti bordered Uusikaupunki, Kalanti, Vehmaa and Taivassalo. It also had a border with Kustavi via the sea.

== History ==
Lokalahti was originally the name of a long bay of the Baltic Sea, reaching out to the village. The bay no longer exists due to the post-glacial rebound in the area, it is now the lake Ahmasvesi and the nearly closed-off Kuutniemenaukko bay.

Lokalahti was originally a part of the Vehmaa parish. Lokalahti already had a chapel in 1409. It became an independent parish in 1630, but rejoined Vehmaa in 1690. Lokalahti became independent again in 1905, remaining independent until it was consolidated with the town of Uusikaupunki in 1981. The Lokalahti parish became one of Uusikaupunki's areal parishes in the process.

== Church ==
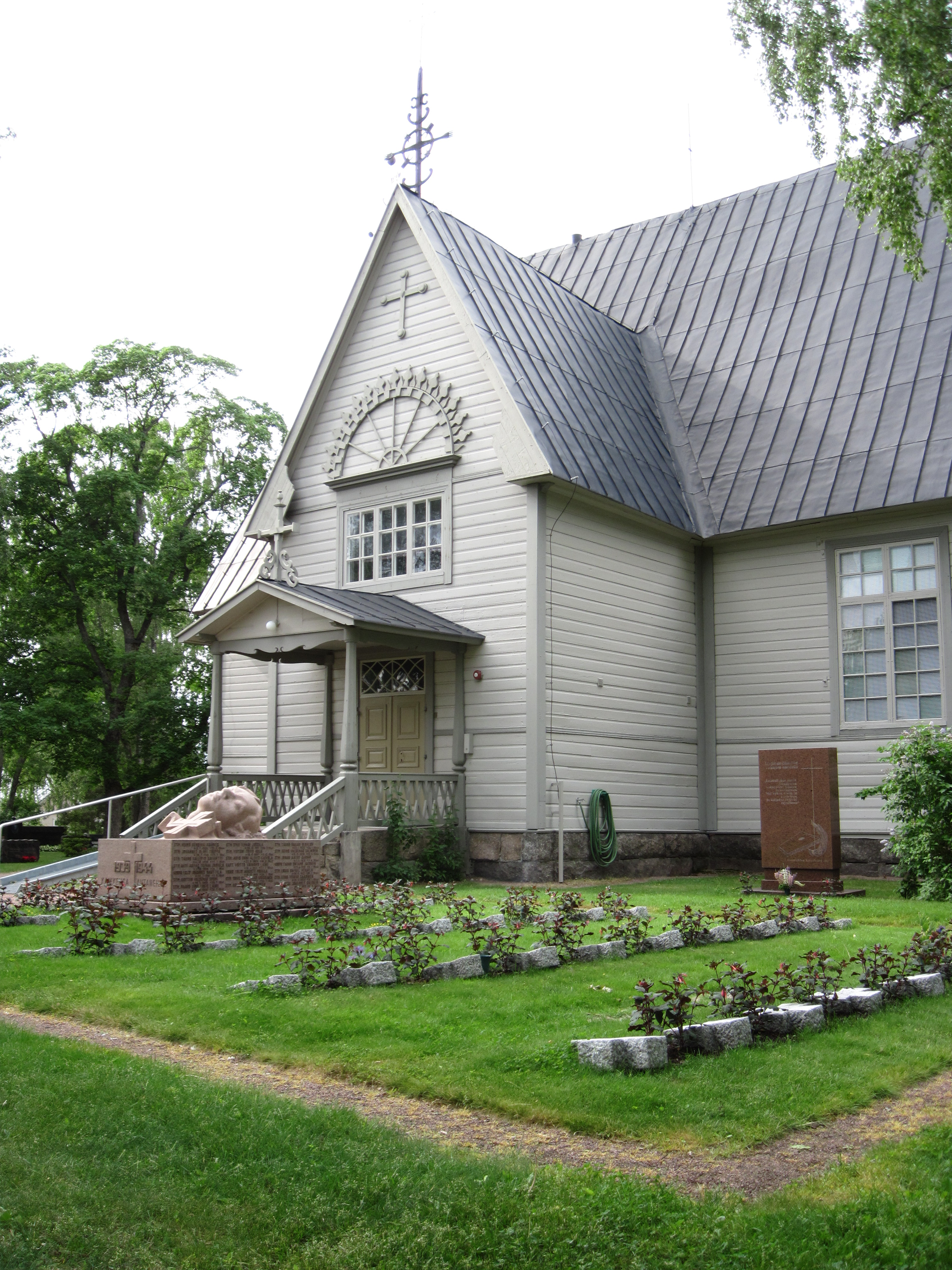

The current church of Lokalahti was finished in 1763. It was designed by Johan Höckert. The bell tower is a remnant of the earlier church, built in the 17th century. The church was renovated in the 19th century by Georg Theodor Chiewitz and later in the 1950s by Totti Sora.

== Notable people ==
- Ritva Elomaa
- Ilkka Kanerva
- Juho Kaskinen
- Arvo Sainio
- Urpo Vähäranta

== Events ==
The Karjurock festival is held on the Nopperla farm of Lokalahti in late July.
