= Walter Kuusela =

Finnish politician

Kustaa Walter Kuusela (3 August 1903 – 31 July 1985) was a Finnish farmworker, farmer and politician, born in Honkilahti. He was a member of the Parliament of Finland from 1942 to 1948, representing the Social Democratic Party of Finland (SDP).
