= Mika Kares =

Finnish opera singer

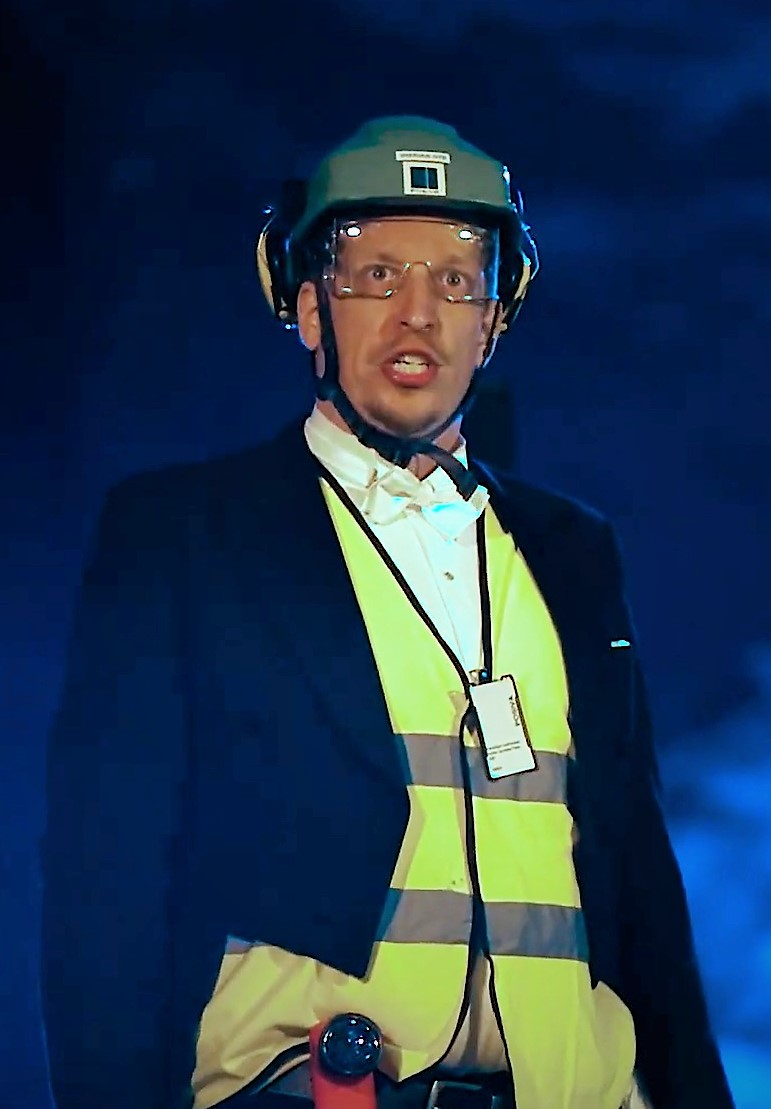
- Kares sings in the Onkalo spent nuclear fuel repository in 2016
- Born: 1 November 1978 (age 47); Laitila, Finland
- Education: Sibelius Academy
- Occupation: Operatic bass
- Organizations: Badisches Staatstheater Karlsruhe

Mika Kares (born 1 November 1978) is a Finnish operatic bass in opera and concert who made an international career. He was first based at the Badisches Staatstheater Karlsruhe, and went on to the Savonlinna Opera Festival, the Palau de les Arts Reina Sofía in Valencia, and the Seattle Opera, among others.

== Life ==
Born in Laitila, Kares studied singing with Roland Hermann at the Sibelius Academy in Helsinki. He made his operatic debut in the title role of Le nozze di Figaro and started an international career. His roles include Philip II in Verdi's Don Carlos, Sarastro in Mozart's The Magic Flute, Colline in Puccini's La Bohème, Raimondo in Donizetti's Lucia di Lammermoor, Massimiliano Moor in Verdi's I masnadieri, the Commendatore in Mozart's Don Giovanni, and as his first Wagner roles Fafner in Das Rheingold and Siegfried, and Hunding in Die Walküre. From 2005 to 2010 he was a member of the ensemble at the Badisches Staatstheater Karlsruhe.

In 2008, he performed at the Savonlinna Opera Festival for the first time, as Boito's Mefistofele. He appeared as the King in Verdi' Aida at the Finnish National Opera in Helsinki in 2010, and as Polyphemus in Lully's Acis et Galatée at the Salzburger Mozartwoche in 2011. The same year, Kares made guest appearances in Helsinki (as Teller in John Adams' Doctor Atomic), in Oviedo (as Sarastro) and at the Palau de les Arts Reina Sofía in Valencia, as Angelotti in Puccini's Tosca, second prisoner and Don Fernando in Beethoven's Fidelio and Truffaldino in Ariadne auf Naxos by Richard Strauss. In January 2012, he performed the title role of Verdi's Attila for the first time, at the Seattle Opera. He appeared as Landgrave in Wagner's Tannhäuser in Tampere and as Ramfis in Aida and Sarastro in Savonlinna. In 2013, he first performed at the Royal Opera of Versailles, as Daland in Wagner's Der fliegende Holländer with Les Musiciens du Louvre conducted by Marc Minkowski. In Savonlinna, he appeared as King Heinrich in Lohengrin. In March 2014, he sang both the Commendatore and Masetto in Don Giovanni, in Nikolaus Harnoncourt's concert Da Ponte cycle at the Theater an der Wien.

Kares has also made guest appearances in Hong Kong, Vienna, Paris, and Rome, sang with conductors such as Lorin Maazel and Zubin Mehta, and was a cover at the Metropolitan Opera in New York City. He is artistic director of a festival for chamber music.

== Awards ==
- 2007: Der Goldene Fächer (the golden fan) for best singer at Badisches Staatstheater Karlsruhe
- 2008: Künstler des Jahres (Artist of the Year) of the Savonlinna Opera Festival for the title role in Boito's Mefistofele
- 2011: Silver Order of Merit
- 2013: Culture Medal from Western Finland
- 2013: Grammy nomination
- 2017: BBC Music Magazine Award
