= Siim Liivik =

Estonian-Finnish ice hockey player

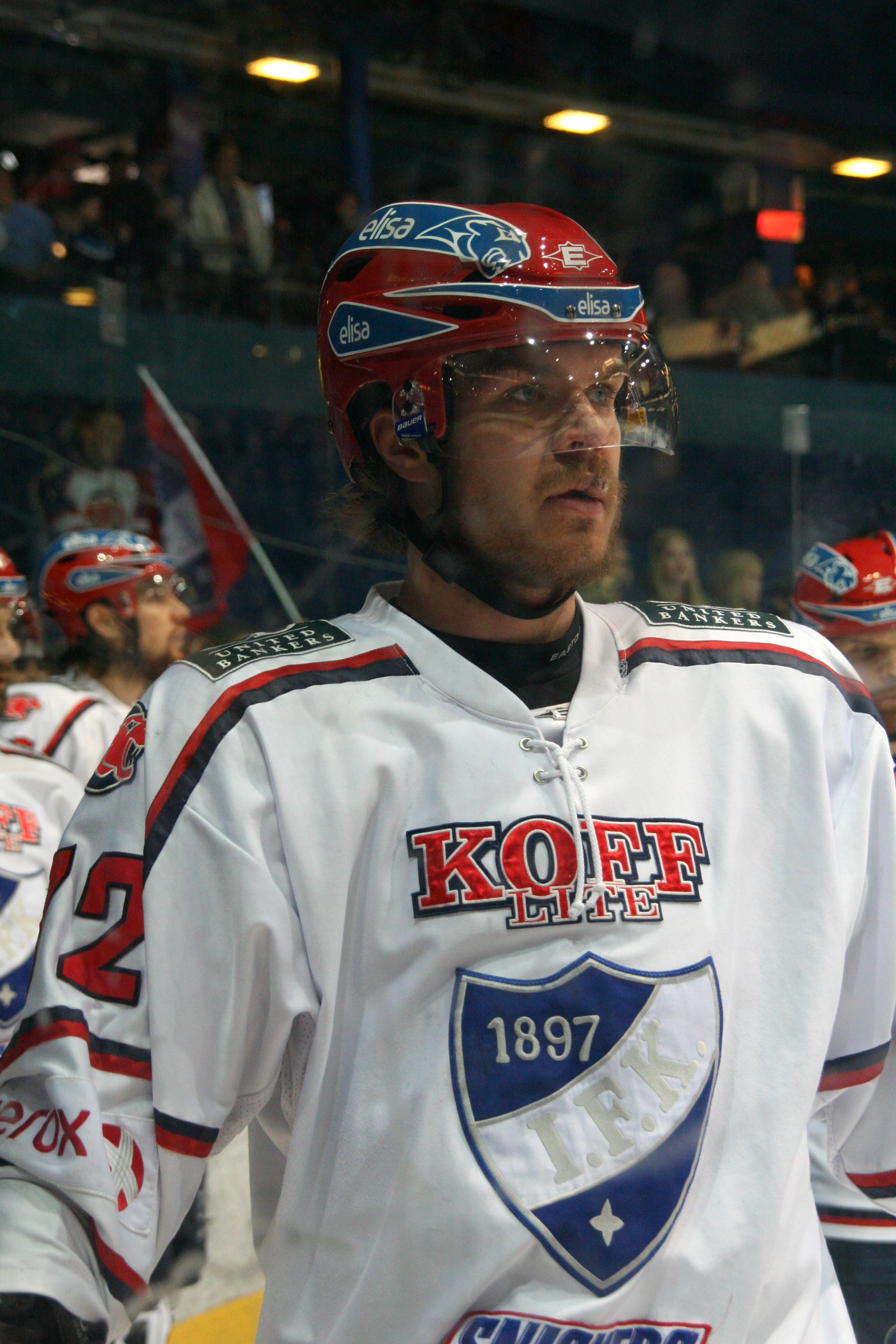
- Born: 14 February 1988 (age 38) Paide, then part of Estonian SSR, Soviet Union
- Height: 6 ft 2 in (188 cm)
- Weight: 192 lb (87 kg; 13 st 10 lb)
- Position: Left wing
- Shot: Left
- Played for: HIFK; Espoo Blues; Örebro HK; KooKoo; EC KAC
- National team: Finland and Estonia
- NHL draft: Undrafted
- Playing career: 2008–2020

Siim Liivik (born 14 February 1988) is an Estonian-Finnish former professional ice hockey winger.

== Playing career ==
Liivik started his professional career with HIFK in 2008. Before joining the Helsinki-based club's first team, Liivik played in the United States with the Waterloo Black Hawks of the United States Hockey League. He has also represented HIFK at different youth levels.

He made his first appearance for HIFK in the 2008–09 season opener against local rivals Jokerit on 11 September 2008. On 30 September 2008, he scored his first SM-liiga goal when HIFK faced KalPa at home. Liivik won the Finnish hockey championship in the 2010–11 season. After his first professional seasons with HIFK, Liivik transferred as a free agent to fellow Liiga outfit, the Espoo Blues, on 8 April 2013.

After three seasons with the Blues and a short return stint with HIFK, Liivik signed his first contract abroad in agreeing to a two-year contract with Swedish club, Örebro HK, of the Swedish Hockey League (SHL) on 27 April 2016.

In 2020, Liivik announced his retirement as a player.

== International play ==
Liivik was a represented Finland national team in the World U20 Championships for in 2008. Liivik played with the Estonian national team in the November 2018 Baltic Challenge Cup.

== Personal ==
Under his known nickname Märkä-Simo, Siim Liivik was featured in the music video of the 2011 single "Häissä" by Finnish rappers Jare & VilleGalle. The single released on the Monsp Finnish record label, proved very popular and reached the top of the Finnish Singles Chart. The official music video directed by andrei6000 features Märkä-Simo rapping with the duo.

== Career statistics ==
=== Regular season and playoffs ===
| | | | Regular season | | | | | Playoffs |
| Season | Team | League | GP | G | A | Pts | PIM | GP | G | A | Pts | PIM |
|---|---|---|---|---|---|---|---|---|---|---|---|---|
| 2007–08 | Waterloo Black Hawks | USHL | 44 | 11 | 6 | 17 | 68 | 1 | 0 | 1 | 1 | 0 |
| 2008–09 | HIFK | SM-l | 58 | 5 | 5 | 10 | 32 | 2 | 0 | 0 | 0 | 0 |
| 2009–10 | HIFK | SM-l | 40 | 3 | 4 | 7 | 88 | 3 | 0 | 0 | 0 | 0 |
| 2009–10 | Kiekko-Vantaa | Mestis | 1 | 0 | 0 | 0 | 0 | — | — | — | — | — |
| 2010–11 | HIFK | SM-l | 53 | 6 | 9 | 15 | 89 | 16 | 0 | 6 | 6 | 20 |
| 2011–12 | HIFK | SM-l | 51 | 8 | 10 | 18 | 149 | 4 | 0 | 0 | 0 | 22 |
| 2011–12 | KooKoo | Mestis | 3 | 1 | 1 | 2 | 0 | — | — | — | — | — |
| 2012–13 | HIFK | SM-l | 46 | 3 | 5 | 8 | 65 | 6 | 1 | 3 | 4 | 0 |
| 2013–14 | Espoo Blues | Liiga | 54 | 9 | 9 | 18 | 110 | 6 | 0 | 0 | 0 | 0 |
| 2014–15 | Espoo Blues | Liiga | 59 | 11 | 17 | 28 | 82 | 4 | 1 | 0 | 1 | 24 |
| 2015–16 | Espoo Blues | Liiga | 15 | 1 | 4 | 5 | 22 | — | — | — | — | — |
| 2015–16 | HIFK | Liiga | 38 | 4 | 9 | 13 | 6 | 16 | 0 | 1 | 1 | 2 |
| 2016–17 | Örebro HK | SHL | 21 | 2 | 6 | 8 | 14 | — | — | — | — | — |
| 2017–18 | KooKoo | Liiga | 42 | 4 | 12 | 16 | 79 | — | — | — | — | — |
| 2018–19 | EC KAC | EBEL | 54 | 3 | 8 | 11 | 20 | 15 | 1 | 4 | 5 | 28 |
| 2019–20 | EC KAC | EBEL | 43 | 2 | 5 | 7 | 18 | 3 | 0 | 1 | 1 | 6 |
| Liiga totals | | | 456 | 54 | 84 | 138 | 720 | 57 | 2 | 10 | 12 | 68 |
| EBEL totals | | | 97 | 5 | 13 | 18 | 38 | 18 | 1 | 5 | 6 | 34 |

=== International ===
| Year | Team | Event | Result | GP | G | A | Pts | PIM |
|---|---|---|---|---|---|---|---|---|
| 2008 | Finland | WJC | 5th | 6 | 0 | 1 | 1 | 2 |
| Junior totals | | | | 6 | 0 | 1 | 1 | 2 |

== Achievements ==
=== SM-liiga ===
- Kanada-malja (Finnish Ice hockey champion): 2010–11
- EBEL-League (Austrian Ice hockey champion): 2018–19
