= Kaarlo Heininen =

Finnish politician (1853–1926)

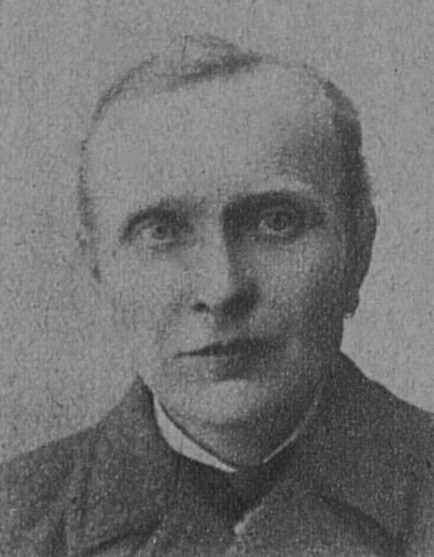
Image of Kaarlo Heininen

Kaarlo Heininen (24 March 1853, in Laitila – 15 November 1926; original surname Wallenström) was a Finnish miller and politician. He was a member of the Parliament of Finland from 1907 to 1908, representing the Christian Workers' Union of Finland (SKrTL).
