= Antti Louhisto =

Finnish sculptor

Antti Louhisto (1 January 1918, Virolahti – 17 July 1989) was a Finnish sculptor. He was third son of Anton and Marianna Louhisto.

Louhisto was rewarded Pro Finlandia in 1965.

== Works ==
- Leningradin ja Turun ystävyyden patsas (1967–1968), bronze
