= Thomas Warburton (writer) =

Finnish writer and translator (1918–2016)

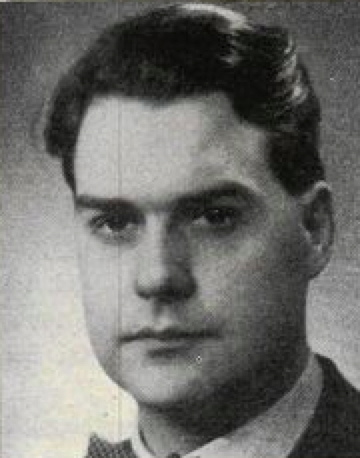
Thomas Warburton (around 1950)

Thomas Henry Warburton (4 March 1918 in Vaasa – 18 December 2016 in Helsinki) was a Finnish writer, translator, and recipient of the Eino Leino Prize in 1997, as well as the State Prize for Translators in 1971, 1977, and 1978, the Tollander Prize in 1976, and the Lybeck Prize in 1971. He was the son of engineer Thomas Harald Warburton and Elli Nordling, and married Kerstin Ingeborg Schulman in 1940. Warburton graduated from the Svenska Normallyceum i Helsingfors in 1936 and studied at the University of Helsinki from 1936 to 1943. As an author, his works include the poetry collection Du, människa (1942), the essay collection Tvä främlingar (1944) on T.S. Eliot and James Joyce, and the literary history Femtio år finlandssvensk litteratur (1951).

Warburton translated James Joyce's Ulysses into Swedish in 1946 and his revised translation was published in 1993. He was a prolific translator into Swedish from both English and Finnish. His translations from English include works by William Faulkner, T. S. Eliot, Gertrude Stein, Dylan Thomas, William Styron, and Kenzaburō Ōe. From Finnish, he translated authors such as Mika Waltari, Yrjö Kokko, Paavo Haavikko, Eeva-Liisa Manner, and Volter Kilpi. He "translated two works from Swedish and also translated four of Tove Jansson's Moomin books into English – he was Jansson's publisher." He also translated The Exploits of Moominpappa (1952), Moominsummer Madness (1955), Moominland Midwinter (1957), Tales from Moominvalley (1962) from Swedish to English. His start "was a subeditor and general handyman at Schildts publishers in Helsinki" and eventually became an editor and director. He began working for the publisher Holger Schildts förlag in 1943, was on the editorial staff of the journal Nya Argus from 1949 to 1975, and served on the board of the Society of Swedish-speaking Writers in Finland from 1946 to 1960.
