= Stockholm–Turku mail route =

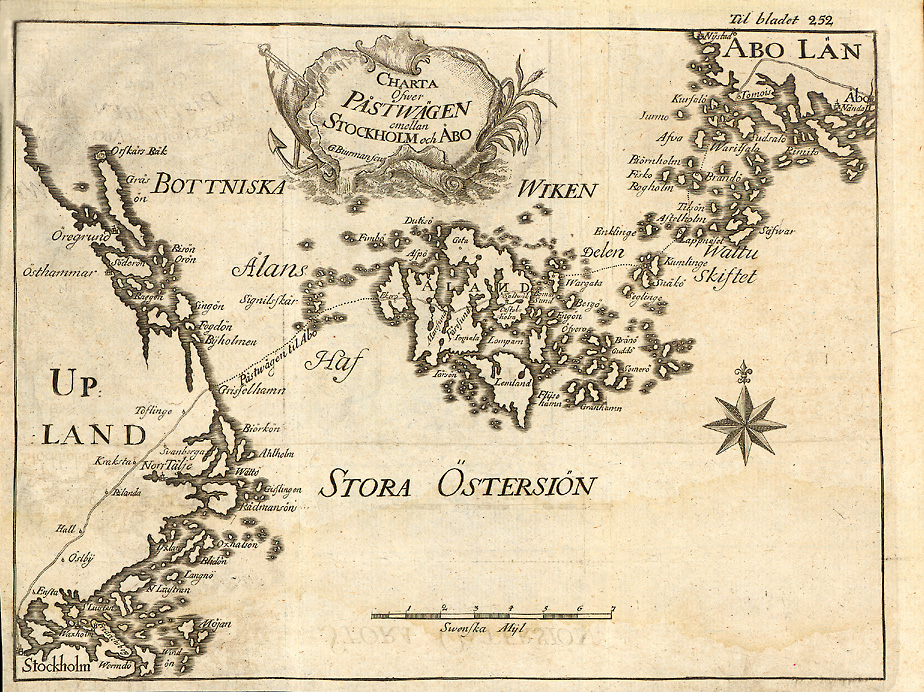
Map of the postal route c. 1749

The mail route between Stockholm and Turku that later extended further east to Saint Petersburg is a historical route that was established in the 17th century when a need arose for fast postal service in the Swedish Empire, which at the time included modern-day Finland as well as Karelia, a small part of Russia.

== History ==
The postal route was established in 1638 under Queen Christina by order of chancellor Axel Oxenstierna. This route followed the main paths of an already existing unofficial postal route, which also served as a route for pilgrims. From its official establishment, Ålandish farmers were appointed to ensure the security of the mail being delivered along the whole path as well as supplying the ships, horses, shelter and food for these 'postmen'. One or more of these farmers would be assigned to each segment based on what was considered necessary.

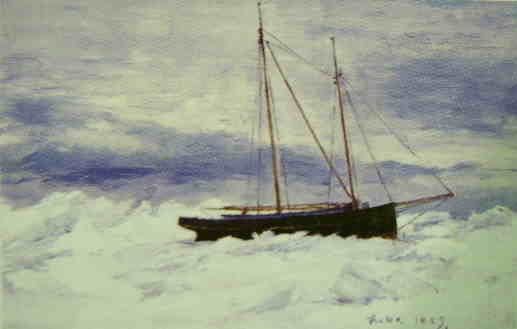
Oil painting of a postal boat stuck in an ice floe (J.A.G. Acke 1889)

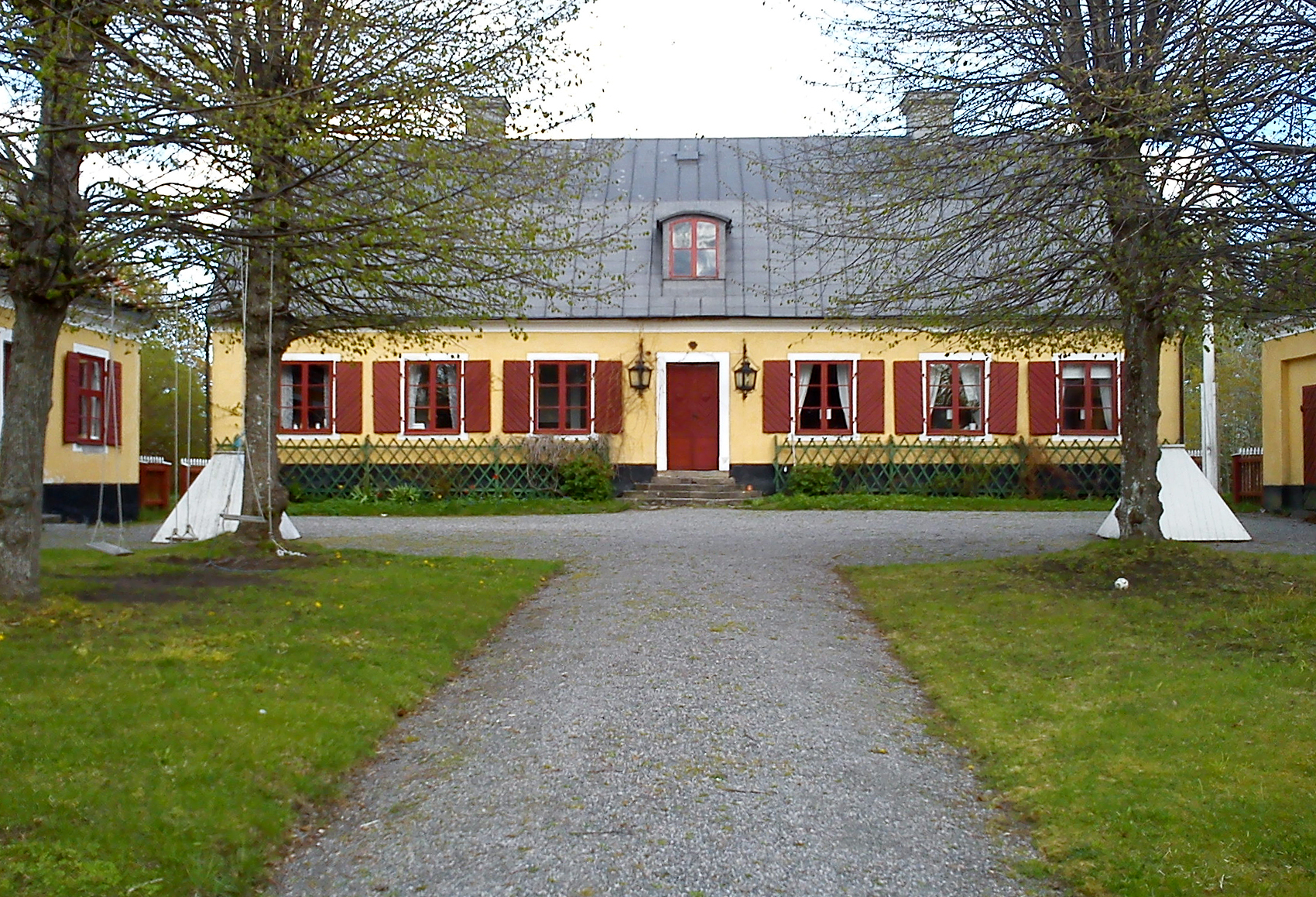
The post office in New-Grisslehamn, built in 1756, after the old Grisslehamn including the post office burned down.

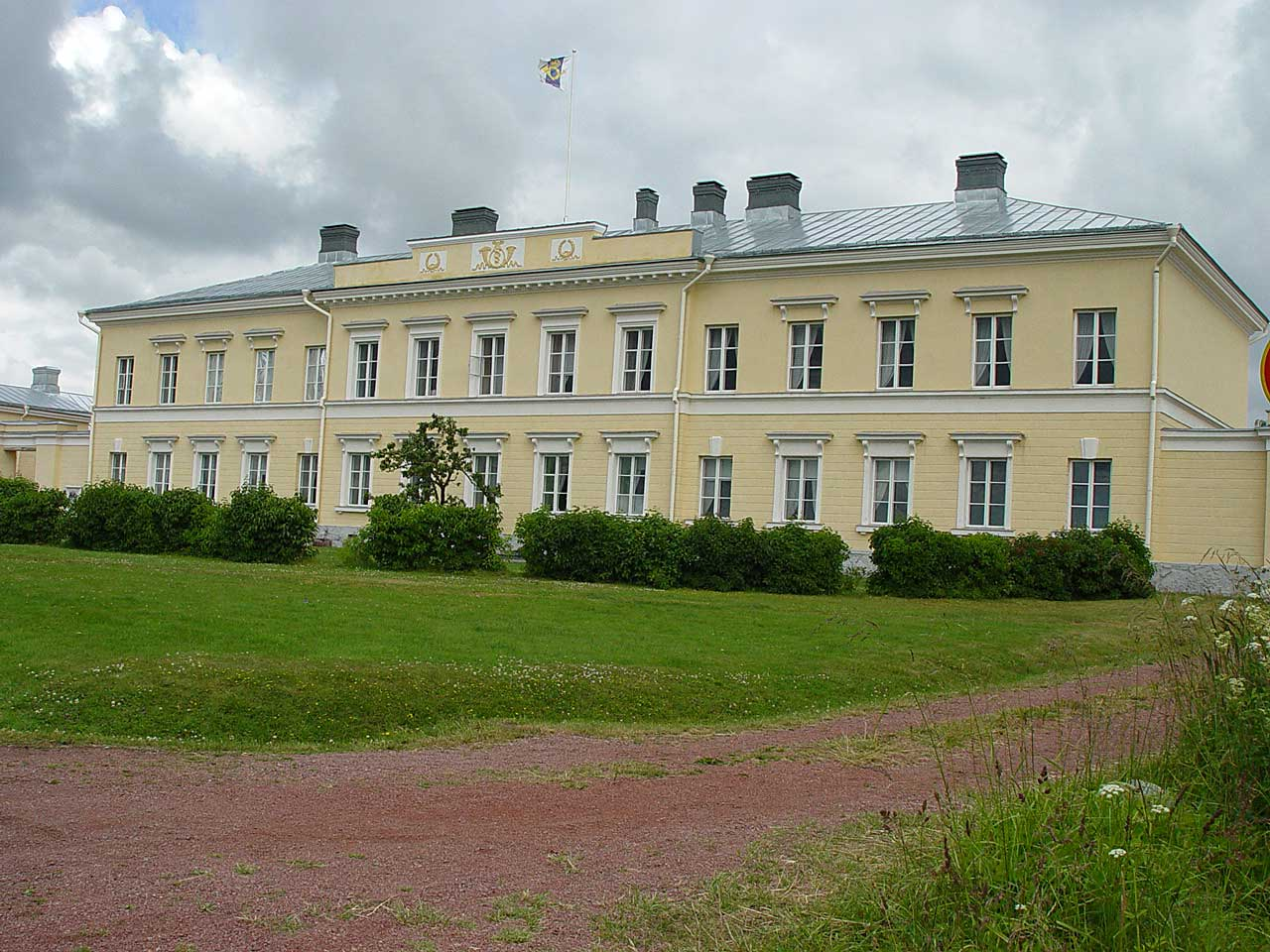
The former postal and customs building in Eckerö, built in 1828 by the Russian oppressors.

The start of the route ran through part of Stockholm and onward to Grisslehamn. From there, the delivery went in a sort of relay race by special postal boat via the island of Signilskär to Eckerö in Åland. The postal boats were small, 6-8 meter long, open boats that often had to be rowed but were later equipped with sails. Since transport by sea was risky, especially during the winter, because the small boats could be blown off course by storms or get stuck on a sheet of ice. At times the boats had to be hauled over ice before they could resume sailing. If the sea was completely frozen, it was sometimes possible to make the journey via horse and sleigh. Because of the many risks of this route, people that sailed in these boats became hailed as heroes, and the percentage of widows was rather high.

Upon arriving at the village of Storby on Eckerö, the mail was transported across the main island of Åland along the Kastelholm Castle to the easternmost point in Vårdö. From there, people in postal boats came in action again; to Kumlinge and travelling by Brändö and Kustavi until reaching the Finnish mainland. From there, it was possible to reach Turku and travel even further east.

In 1754, the whole village of Grisslehamn burned down. The village was rebuilt twenty kilometres to the north, as it made the journey somewhat shorter.

== The mail route nowadays ==
Over the course of the 19th century, the postal route lost its past prestige, due to the increasing use of steamboats in that they could deliver all of the post at once by crossing the Baltic Sea. The first ship specifically designed with this goal in mind was the 'Postiljonen'. Oftentimes it didn't turn out so well, because when a steamboat got stuck in the ice, it was too heavy to be pulled and the old postal boats had to be sent out. In the bitter winter of 1910-1911 the traditional postal boats were used for the last time.

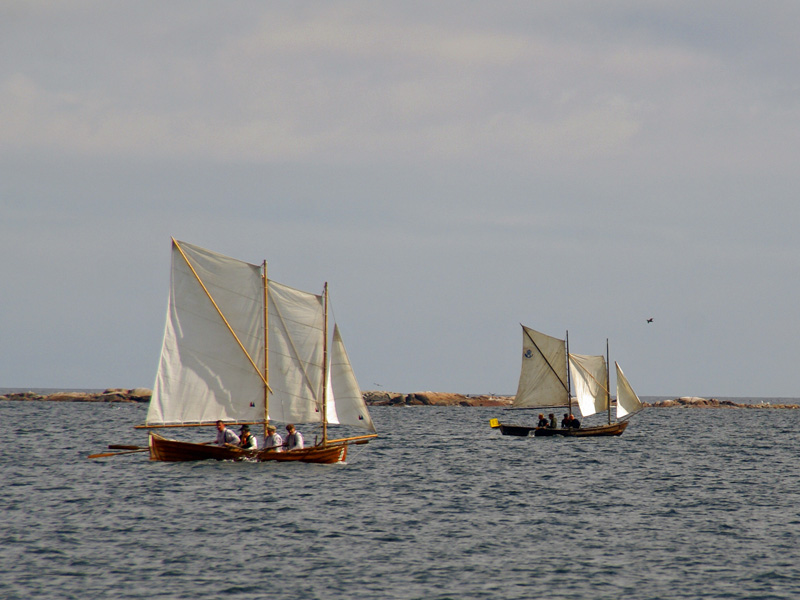
Reconstructed historical postal boats.

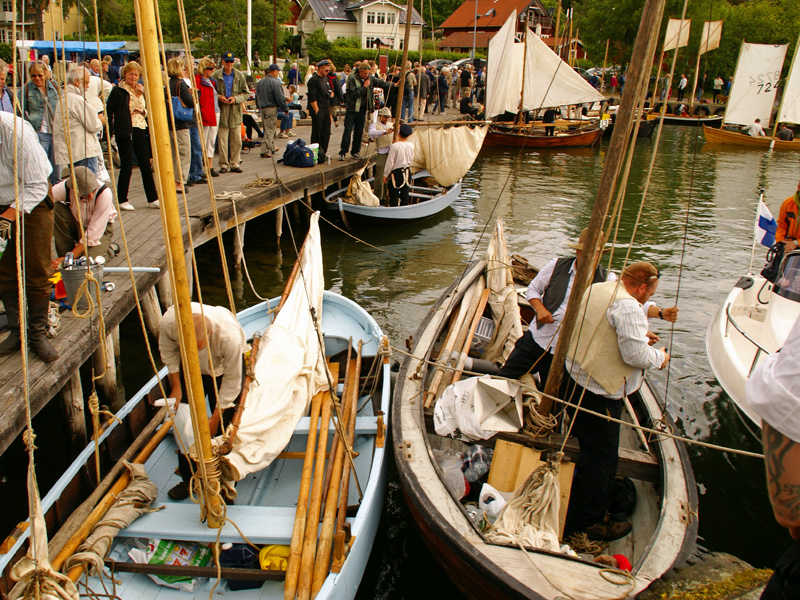
Postal boats before the start in Grisslehamn.

Nowadays, the postal road gets increasing attention thanks to tourism. Additionally, it's been steadily gaining historical sense. There is a signposted bike path along the original route on Åland's mainland. Since 1974 there has been a yearly post rowing regatta in June that is organized in replica postal boats between Eckerö and Grisslehamn: one year heading eastwards and the subsequent year in the western direction. In the event, all teams have to deliver a bag with real mail. As many as forty teams of four members take part in the regatta. The record time stands at 3 hours and 18 minutes (2005). However, it really isn't about the competitive aspect as much as the social festivities, commemorating the history, the touristic element, and of course, the safe delivery of the postal bags.

=== Museums ===
- Next to the principal postal and customs building in Storby is a tiny museum that is dedicated to the postal route.
- The shipping museum in the Swedish Älmsta pays tribute to the postal road too.

== Additional postal routes ==
Simultaneously, there have been some similar sea-crossing postal routes, for example:

- A few hundred kilometres to the north runs another historical postal route between the Swedish Holmöarna and the Finnish Svedjehamn on the island Björkö (in the Korsholm municipality), 36 nautical miles (around 60 km) over the Kvarken Sea Strait. Postal regattas are also held here yearly in June on the first Saturday after midsummer.
- Since 1982, postal regattas have been held between Klintehamn on the Swedish island of Gotland and Böda on the island Öland.
- Since 2003, postal regattas have also been held between Åland and Turku.

== Literature ==
- (in Swedish) Jan Andersson: Postvägen över Åland (1999), ISBN 9518946655.
  English translation: (in English) The mail road across Åland, ISBN 9518946671
