= Helsinki village landing =

1808 battle of the Finnish War

Coordinates: 60.6054670°N 21.437409°E

- Part of the Finnish War
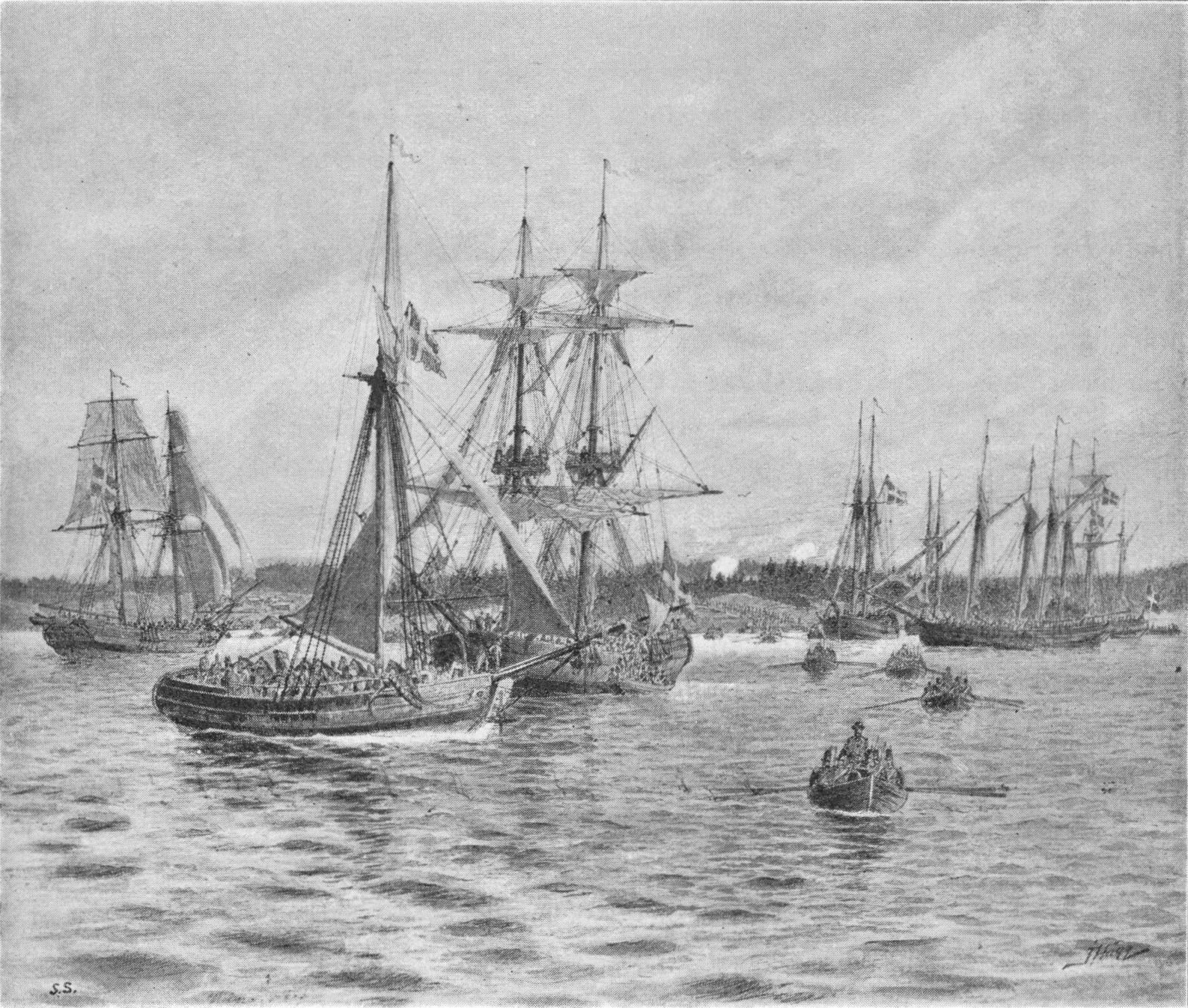
- Embarkation after the Battle of Helsinki, by Jacob Hägg
Date	26–28 September 1808
Location	Helsinki village (Helsinge), Taivassalo (Tövsala), Southwest Finland, Sweden
Result	Russian victory

Belligerents
Sweden	Russian Empire

Commanders and leaders
Gustaf Boije; Gustaf Olof Lagerbring	(Russian Empire) Pyotr Bagration (Russian Empire) Karl Gustav von Baggovut

Strength
Swedish accounts: 3,300 Russian accounts: 4,000–5,000	Russian accounts: 4,000–4,500; 7 cannons Swedish accounts: 5,000–6,000

Casualties and losses
Swedish accounts: 657–826 Russian accounts: c. 1,000 killed and wounded, 350 captured, 15 cannons, 1 standard, 1 wagon train.	Russian accounts: 400–524

The Helsinki village landing, or the Combat of Helsinge (Russian: Бой у Гельсинге), was fought during the Finnish War between Sweden and the Russian Empire on 26–28 September [O.S. 14–16 September] 1808, a part of the battles of the Turku archipelago.

== Prelude ==
King Gustav IV Adolf of Sweden planned a large-scale landing operation with over 8,000 troops. However, due to severe sea conditions, the task force under Colonel Anders Fredrik Skjöldebrad was forced to return to Sweden, damaged and broken. The other task force of 3,300 men under Lieutenant Colonel Gustav Olof Lagerbring landed at Helsinki village (Helsinge) in Taivassalo (Tövsala) and advanced inland. The king of Sweden was late to the battle area himself; he arrived on 28 September 1808 aboard his personal yacht.

The Russians, under Prince Pyotr Bagration, organized 4,000 to 4,500 troops against the Swedes in six battalions, three squadrons, one Cossack regiment with seven cannons. According to Swedish and Russian estimates, their enemies had 4,000–5,000 and 5,000–6,000 men respectively.

== Course of battle ==
=== Monday 26 September ===
The landing started in at 09:00 o'clock in the morning. The Cossacks who patrolled at the beach were pushed back to the village of Järvenperä. The Swedish troops advanced slowly and the Russians reacted quickly, as they sent three companies from the Pernov (Pärnu) Musketeer Regiment supported by 2 cannons to oppose the advancing Swedes at Järvenperä. The Kronoberg Regiment offensive caused the Russians to retreat. The Swedes had 4 men wounded on the first day of fighting (one mortally). The Russians had some killed and wounded but only one captured.

=== Tuesday 27 September ===
In the morning, the Swedes proceeded to advance in the direction of the village of Viiainen. There, Russian Lieutenant General Karl Gustav von Baggovut had built a defense line with a battalion of the Nevski Musketeer Regiment. According to Baggovut's orders, they had to delay the progress of the Swedes, but the Swedes pushed the Russians back from their positions. Colonel Freiherr Gustaf Reinhold Boije af Gennäs was named as the commander of the Swedish battle forces. The Swedes had 10 or 12 killed, 71 wounded and 3 missing on the second day of fighting. The Russian loss in killed and wounded was significant, while 40 were captured.

=== Wednesday 28 September ===
During the night, Prince Pyotr Bagration brought sizable reinforcements to Baggovut. Bagration organized his offensive in three columns, two of which would enter the rear and Baggovut's would launch a frontal attack. Boije planned a two-pronged offensive for the Swedes. One Swedish force would attack from north of Viiainen to Puosta, while at the same time the Lagerbring force would strike the flank of Russian forces at Puosta through Haaroinen and Ranta. Because of the reinforcements, Baggovut had the initiative and he struck strongly and directly to Boije's main line of position while simultaneously starting a flank offensive via Ranta. Lagerbring's attack was stopped by the force of the Russian troops and he had to retreat. Boije found the situation hopeless and ordered a general retreat to the Helsinki village. They lost discipline after Grodno Hussars attacked. At the beach the situation was chaotic. The king had ordered all the gunboats to Kahiluoto, and so there were only defenseless troopships left. The loading of the ships happened in disarray under Russian fire and resulted in large losses. The Swedes had lost 45 killed, 176 wounded and 346 missing (of which more than 300 captured) on the third day of fighting.

In total, between 657 and 826 Swedes were lost in all three days. Russian general Paul van Suchtelen attested to 1,000 Russians and Swedes being killed in total; while 362 Swedes had been captured, along with their wagon train. Furthermore, five or 15 Swedish guns and one of their standards were captured. By their own accounts, the Russians had 120 killed, 352 wounded and 52 captured during the three days of fighting, or 400 men.

=== Swedish regiments and losses ===
- Swedish command Staff; 1 wounded and 1 missing — 2
- Svea Life Guards (1 battalion); 9 killed, 20 wounded and 3 missing — 32
- Swedish Guard Regiment (1 battalion); 6 killed, 27 wounded and 3 missing — 36
- Finnish Guard Regiment (1 battalion); 13 killed, 25 wounded and 38 missing — 76
- Jägers (1 battalion, emerged from other regiments); 11 killed, 42 wounded and 4 missing — 57
- Kronoberg Infantry Regiment and auxiliary reserve (3 battalions; of which 1 reserve); 11 killed, 72 wounded and 145 missing — 228
- Västmanland auxiliary reserve (1 battalion); 2 killed, 48 wounded and 64 missing — 114
- Uppland auxiliary reserve (1 battalion); 4 killed, 7 wounded and 87 missing — 98
- Life Guards of Horse (2 squadrons); 3 missing
- Svea Artillery Regiment; 1 killed, 5 wounded and 1 missing — 7
- An additional 4 men were wounded from the Kronoberg and, or Svea Life Guard regiments. — 4

In total: less than 3,800 men (no more than 3,300 in the main battle on the 28th); 57 killed, 251 wounded and 349 missing (of which about 300 privates and 11 officers captured according to Russian records).

== Notes, citations and sources ==
=== Sources ===
- Hornborg, Eirik (1955). När riket sprängdes: fälttågen i Finland och Västerbotten, 1808-1809 (in Swedish). Stockholm: P. A. Norstedts och Söners Förlag.
- Generalstaben (1910), Sveriges krig åren 1808 och 1809, 2, Bilagor (in Swedish), vol. 5, Stockholm: Kongl. boktryckeriet P. A. Norstedt & söner
- Velichko, Konstantin I.; Novitsky, Vasily F.; Schwarz, Alexey V. von; Apushkin, Vladimir A.; Schoultz, Gustav K. von (1912). Военная энциклопедия Сытина [Sytin Military Encyclopedia] (in Russian). Vol. VII: Воинская честь – Гимнастика военная. Moscow: Тип. Т-ва И. Д. Сытина. p. 222.
- Nive, Pyotr (1910). Русско-шведская война 1808—09 г.г. (in Russian). St. Petersburg: Военная Типография.
- Schulman, Hugo (1909). Striden om Finland 1808-1809 (in Swedish). Borgå: Werner Söderström Osakeyhtiö.
- Montgomery, Gustaf (1842). Historia öfver kriget emellan Sverige och Ryssland: åren 1808 och 1809 (in Swedish). Örebro: Lindh.
- van Suchtelen, Paul (1854). Narrative of the Conquest of Finland by the Russians in the Years 1808-9. Translated by Monteith, William. London: Lionel Booth.
