= Imbi Paju =

Estonian writer

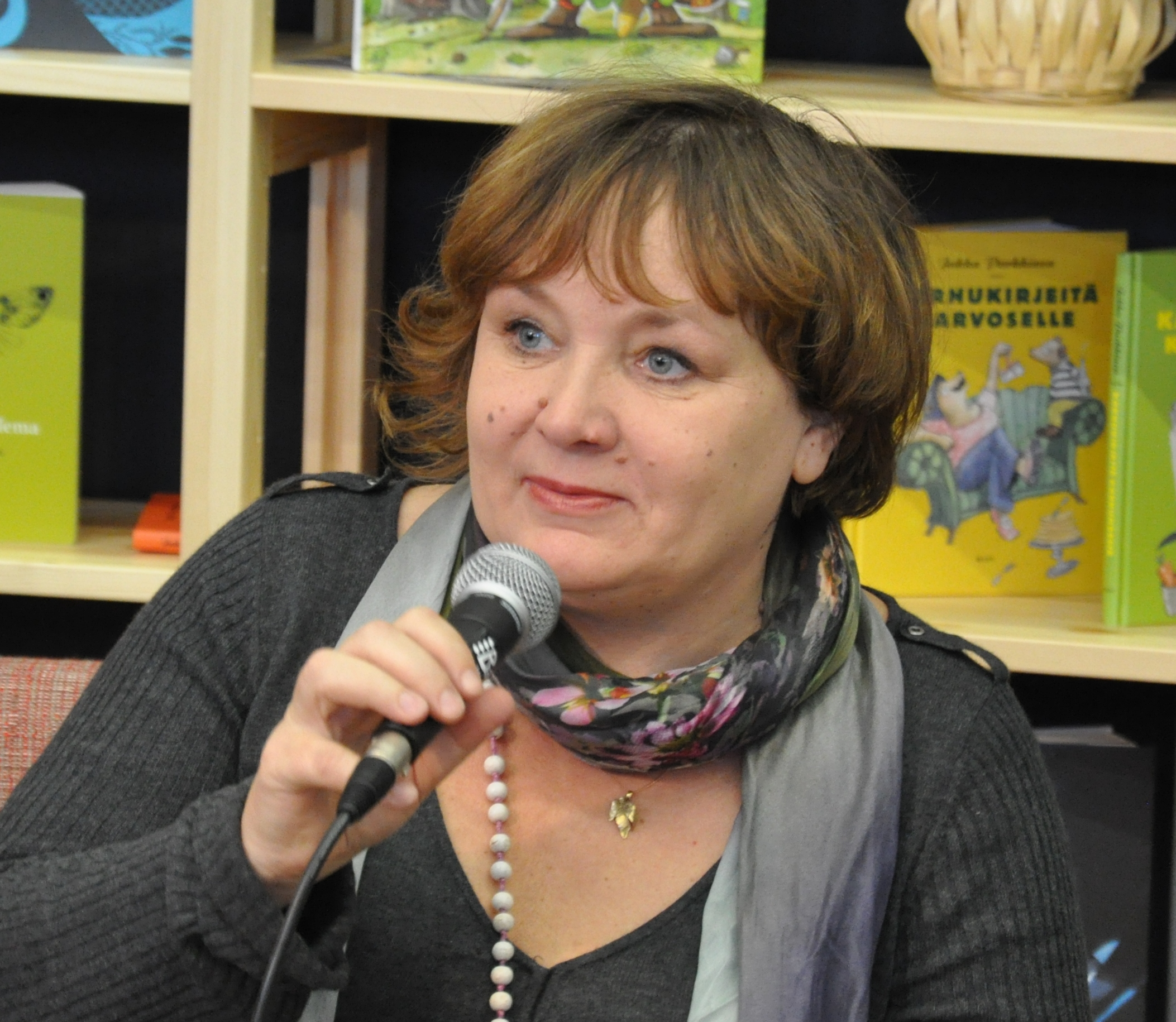
Imbi Paju at the Turku Book Fair, 2009

Imbi Paju (born 3 June 1959) is an Estonian-born journalist, writer and filmmaker resident in Finland.

== Biography ==
Paju was born in Jõgevamaa, but has been operating in Finland as a correspondent of the Estonian newspapers Eesti Päevaleht and Postimees. Before Estonia's re-independence, she worked in Tartu's Vanemuine Theatre opera chorus. 1998-2005 she worked Finnish TV-station Nelonen, specialist in the Baltics

Film director, author and journalist Imbi Paju has won international attention with Memories Denied (2005), her documentary film and book of the same name. Both the film and the book deal with her mother’s experiences in a Soviet slave labor camp, the occupation of Estonia by the Soviet Union and Nazi Germany, and the attempts by totalitarian regimes to destroy human memory. Paju has been praised for her ability to visually portray traumas of the past, something that is hard to do with words alone. Memories Denied shows us how the tragedy of an individual family repeated over and over gradually becomes a national tragedy, a part of the collective but interrupted European narrative, silenced by occupations and the cold reality of politics. Memories Denied has been translated and published in Estonian, Finnish, Swedish, English, Russian, German, Romania, Ukraine, Hungary. In 2007 it was selected for use in the Swedish school program Living History, which deals with both Nazi and Communist crimes. In 2008 the film Memories Denied was translated into Russian, as was the book in 2009. Since then Paju has travelled around Estonia presenting the book to Russian-speaking communities and has had the pleasure to meet with students, teachers, community groups, and others.

In 2009, Paju and Finnish writer Sofi Oksanen published a collection of essays entitled Fear Was Behind Everything. How Estonia Lost its History and How to Get it Back (WSOY) which further develops the same themes.

The year 2009 saw the premiere of her new documentary film Sisters across the Gulf of Finland, which deals with terror, totalitarianism and humanity in the next step on the search for the truth. In 2011/2012 She published psychological-historical best-sellers nonfiction Sisters Across the Gulf of Finland. Watching the Pain of Others (publisher Like 2011/Finland;2012 Hea Lugu/Estonia;2014 Atlantis/Sweden,2014 Homo liber/Lithuania). It is a story about how Estonian, Finnish and other Scandinavian women around Baltic Sea worked together to prevent the onset of crisis and war their own unique actions. Sisters Across The Gulf of Finland. Watching the Pain of Others reveals the pains left to us as an inheritance by the past. Imbi Paju examines the way in which we look at each other, ourselves and our history. The stories of these women refresh our memories and call to mind the pages of our story hidden in the silence of history.

Imbi Paju has lectured and taken part in numerous seminars and deliberations about the crimes of communism and historical denial. Discussions inspired by her book and film in Estonia, Finland, Germany, Norway, Sweden, Denmark, Taiwan, Ireland, Greece, Israel and the United States have helped open a dialogue in Europe as well as North America. This discussion continues with increasing clarity and urgency.
