= Pyhäranta =

- Municipality
- Pyhärannan kunta Pyhäranta kommun
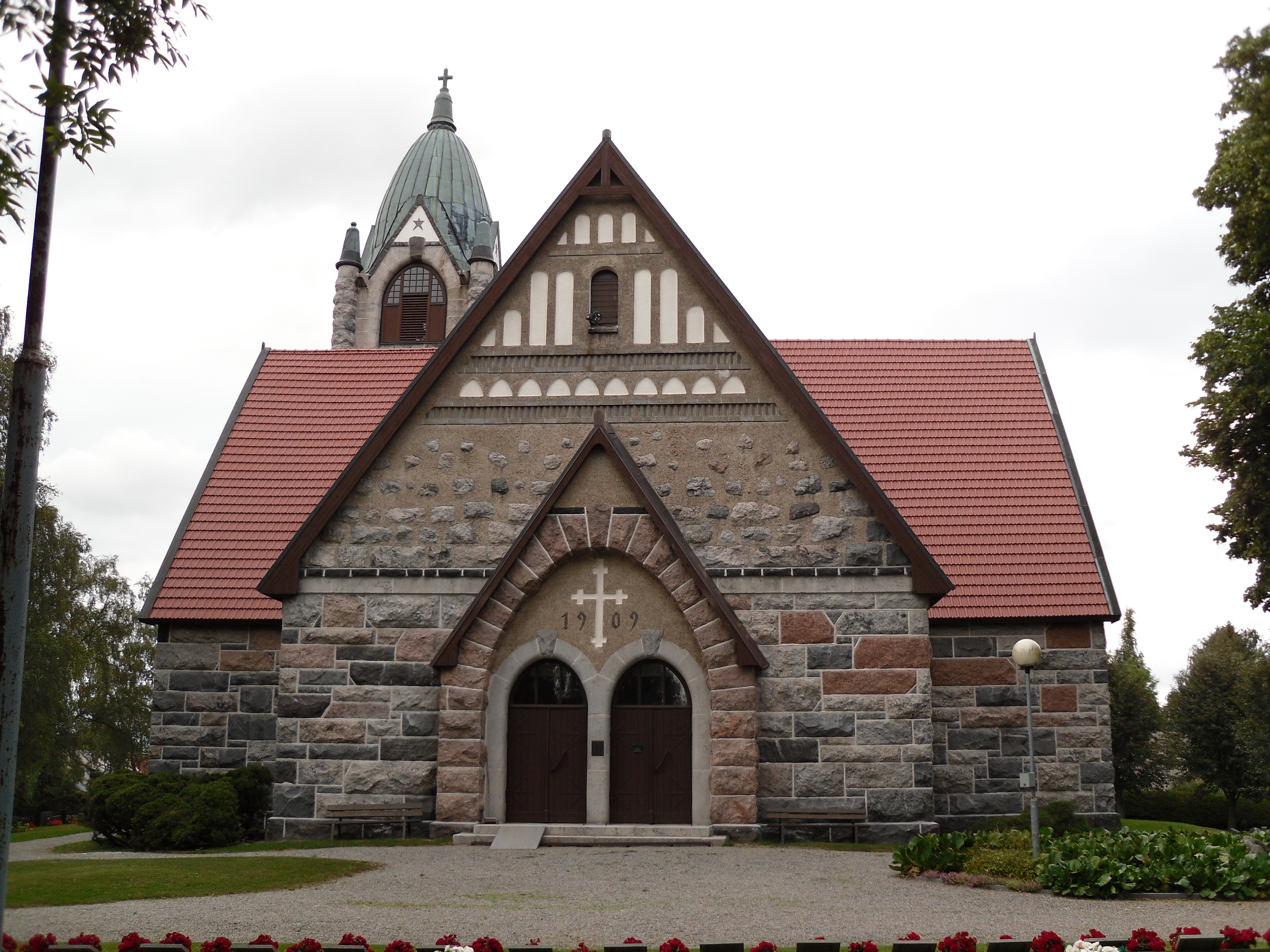
- Pyhäranta Church

- Flag Coat of arms

- Location of Pyhäranta in Finland
- Interactive map of Pyhäranta
- Coordinates: 60°57′N 021°26.5′E
- Country: Finland
- Region: Southwest Finland
- Sub-region: Vakka-Suomi

Government
  - Municipal manager: Leena Hoikkala

Area (2018-01-01)
  - Total: 291.75 km^{2} (112.65 sq mi)
  - Land: 143.51 km^{2} (55.41 sq mi)
  - Water: 148.5 km^{2} (57.3 sq mi)
  - Rank: 281st largest in Finland

Population (2025-12-31)
  - Total: 1,892
  - Rank: 260th largest in Finland
  - Density: 13.18/km^{2} (34.1/sq mi)

Population by native language
  - Finnish: 96.6% (official)
  - Swedish: 0.5%
  - Others: 2.9%

Population by age
  - 0 to 14: 15.3%
  - 15 to 64: 55.5%
  - 65 or older: 29.2%
- Time zone: UTC+02:00 (EET)
  - Summer (DST): UTC+03:00 (EEST)
- Climate: Dfb
- Website: www.pyharanta.fi

Pyhäranta (Finnish pronunciation: [ˈpyhæˌrɑntɑ]) is a municipality of Finland. It is located in the province of Western Finland and is part of the Southwest Finland region. The municipality has a population of 1,892 (31 December 2025) and covers an area of 291.75 square kilometres (112.65 sq mi) of which 148.5 km^{2} (57.3 sq mi) is water. The population density is 13.18 inhabitants per square kilometre (34.1/sq mi).

The municipality is unilingually Finnish. According to Traficom, Pyhäranta is the third most motorized municipality in Finland with 650 cars per thousand inhabitants.
