= Mynämäki =

Mynämäki Virmo
- Municipality
- Mynämäen kunta Virmo kommun
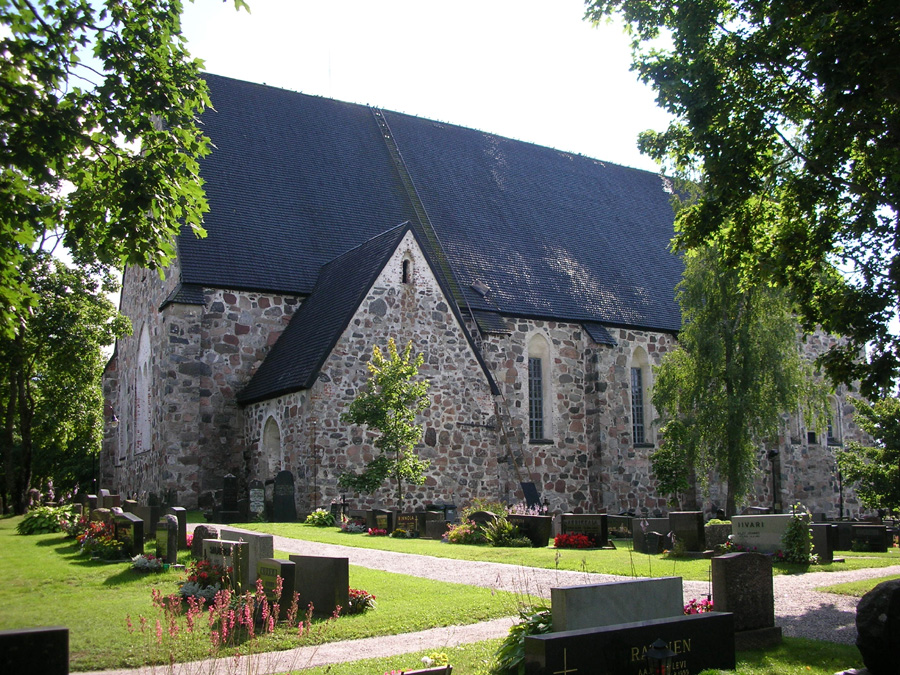
- Mynämäki Church

- Coat of arms

- Location of Mynämäki in Finland
- Interactive map of Mynämäki
- Coordinates: 60°41′N 021°59′E
- Country: Finland
- Region: Southwest Finland
- Sub-region: Turku sub-region
- Re-established: 2007

Government
  - Municipal manager: Carita Maisila

Area (2018-01-01)
  - Total: 536.08 km^{2} (206.98 sq mi)
  - Land: 519.84 km^{2} (200.71 sq mi)
  - Water: 16.37 km^{2} (6.32 sq mi)
  - Rank: 170th largest in Finland

Population (2025-12-31)
  - Total: 7,424
  - Rank: 125th largest in Finland
  - Density: 14.28/km^{2} (37.0/sq mi)

Population by native language
  - Finnish: 94.7% (official)
  - Swedish: 0.9%
  - Others: 4.4%

Population by age
  - 0 to 14: 15%
  - 15 to 64: 57.9%
  - 65 or older: 27.2%
- Time zone: UTC+02:00 (EET)
  - Summer (DST): UTC+03:00 (EEST)
- Climate: Dfb
- Website: www.mynamaki.fi

Mynämäki (Finnish pronunciation: [ˈmynæˌmæki]; Swedish: Virmo) is a municipality of Finland located in the Southwest Finland region. Neighbouring municipalities are Aura, Eura, Laitila, Masku, Nousiainen, Pöytyä, Rusko, Taivassalo, Turku and Vehmaa.

The municipality has a population of 7,424 (31 December 2025) and covers an area of 536.08 square kilometres (206.98 sq mi) of which 16.37 km^{2} (6.32 sq mi) is water. The population density is 14.28 inhabitants per square kilometre (37.0/sq mi). The municipality is unilingually Finnish.

The municipality of Karjala was consolidated with Mynämäki in 1977. The municipality of Mietoinen was consolidated with Mynämäki in 2007.

In the 1980s, the local traditional dishes of Mynämäki were waffle called poffe, and cheese called laurinjuusto made from cow's or goat's milk, which is dried until it can be cut with scissors, for example into soured milk gruel. It can also be smoked using a marsh Labrador tea.

== Notable people ==
- Count Augustin Ehrensvärd (1710–1772) – Field Marshal and the military architect of the Suomenlinna fortress
- Daniel Juslenius (1676–1752)
- Antti Lizelius (1708–1795) – Vicar of Mynämäki in 1761–1795, was the publisher of the first Finnish language newspaper Suomenkieliset Tietosanomat
- Pekka Aakula (1866–1928)
- Toivo Sukari (born 1954)
