= Volter Kilpi =

Finnish author

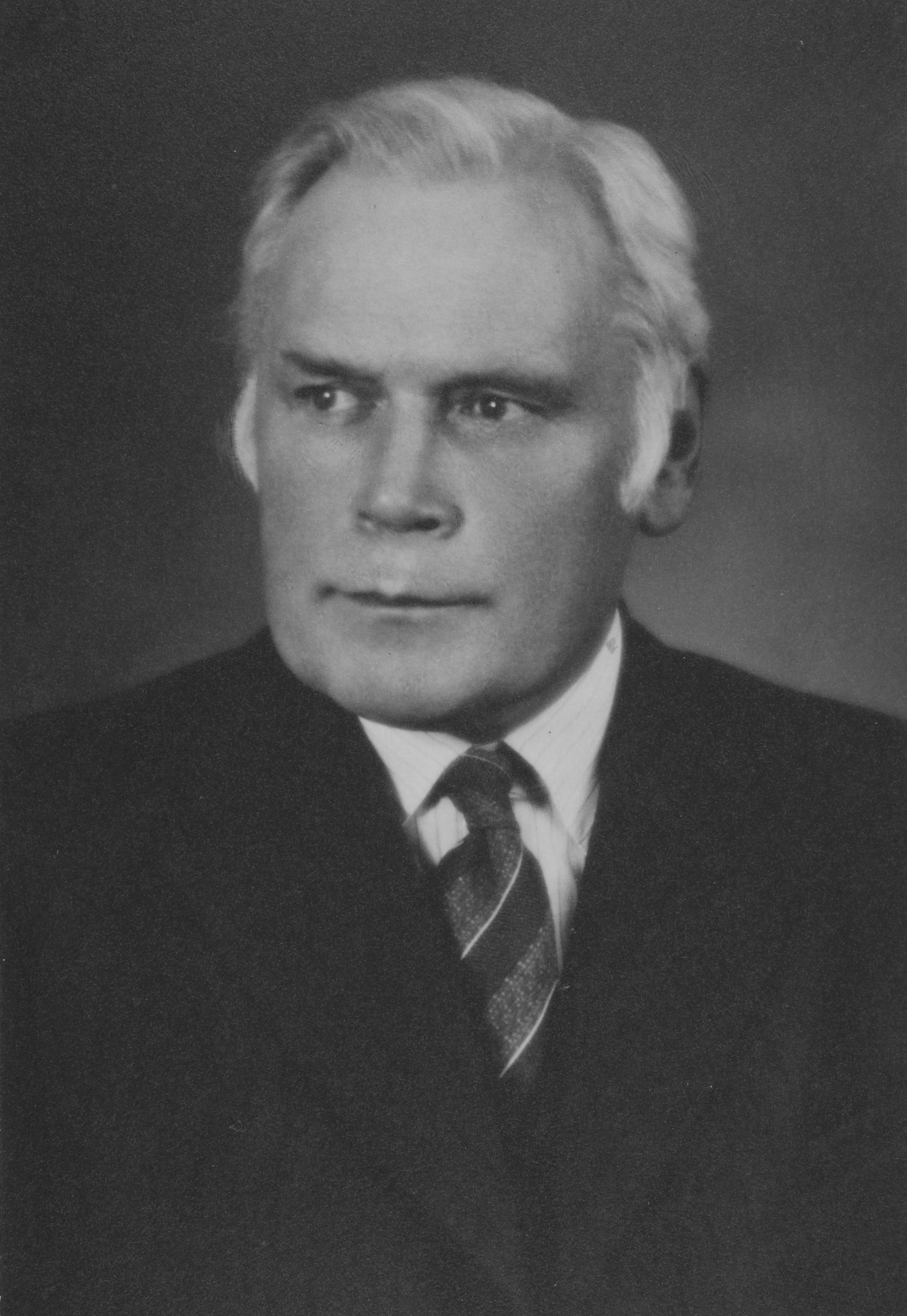
- Born: 12 December 1874; Kustavi, Finland
- Died: 13 June 1939 (aged 64); Turku, Finland
- Occupation: Author
- Relatives: Eero Kilpi (brother)

Volter Kilpi, born Volter Ericsson, (December 12, 1874 – June 13, 1939) was a Finnish author best known for his two-volume novel Alastalon salissa (1933), often considered one of the best written in the Finnish language. Kilpi has been considered an exponent of the modern experimental novel.

== Early life ==
Kilpi was born and brought up in Kustavi, in Finland's western archipelago, and attended a private Finnish-language grammar school in Turku. He was the older brother of stage and film actor Eero Kilpi. An avid reader, he studied at the University of Helsinki. He worked for more than twenty years at the University of Helsinki Library and other libraries in Helsinki before moving to Turku, where he became first a librarian at that city's municipal library, later, in November 1920, the first librarian of Turku's Finnish-language university. Kilpi's most important literary work was written during his years in Turku, near his family roots.

== Literary career ==
Kilpi was still a student when he wrote his first novel, Bathseba: Daavidin puheluja itsensä kanssa (Bathseba: David's Conversations with Himself, 1900). It was awarded the Finnish State Prize for Literature. That same year he also published a collection of incidental pieces, including an effusive celebration of Aleksis Kivi, titled Ihmisestä ja elämästä: Kirjoitelmia (Of Man and Life: Writings). His second novel, Parsifal: Kertomus Graalin ritarista (Parsifal: Tale of a Grail Knight), was published two years later, in 1902. After his third novel, Antinous (1903), he did not publish anything for almost 20 years. In second phase of his career, during the years of Finland's declaration of independence and the Finnish Civil War, he published two books on political themes. In the third phase of his career, Kilpi returned to fiction. Kilpi's most famous work, Alastalon salissa (In the Alastalo Parlour, 1933), was the first of the Archipelago trilogy.

Alastalon salissa is a 900-page two-volume novel whose time-span covers a mere 6 hours of an October Thursday in 1866, and whose setting is the roughly 50 square metres of the Alastalo parlour as the richest men in Kustavi haggle over investing in the building of a barque. The surroundings were familiar to Kilpi from his childhood, as his father and father's stepfather were shipowners, and his relatives had played a key role in the development of Kustavi into an important home port for sailing ships.

The second and third volumes of the Archipelago series, Pitäjän pienempiä (The County's Littler Ones, short stories) and Kirkolle (To the Church Village, a novel), appeared in 1934 and 1937; they were followed by the collection of "swelling prose" Suljetuilla porteilla (At Closed Gates) in 1938. In 1938 he also began his final novel, Gulliverin matka Fantomimian mantereelle, translated by Douglas Robinson as Gulliver's Voyage to Phantomimia; it remained unfinished at his death in Turku, and was published posthumously by his literary executor in 1944.

== Bibliography ==
=== Novels ===
==== Standalone Novels ====
- Daavidin puheluja itsensä kanssa (Bathseba: David's Conversations with Himself, 1900)
- Parsifal: Kertomus Graalin ritarista (Parsifal: Tale of a Grail Knight, 1902)
- Antinous (1903)
- Gulliverin matka Fantomimian mantereelle (Gulliver's Voyage to Phantomimia) (unfinished, written 1938-39, 1944 - posthumous

==== The Archipelago Trilogy ====
1. Alastalon salissa (In the Alastalo Parlour, 1933) - 2 volumes
2. Pitäjän pienempiä (The Littler Ones of the County, 1934) - short story collection
3. Kirkolle (To the Church Village,1937), in German: Zur Kirche, Hamburg/Germany, 2025, ISBN 978-3-86648-717-8

=== Standalone Short Story Collection ===
- Suljetuilla porteilla (At Closed Gates, (1938)
