= Pekka Aakula =

Finnish politician

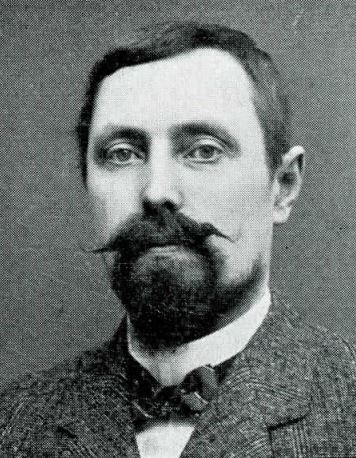
Pekka Aakula

Petter "Pekka" Aakula (2 September 1866 – 11 June 1928) was a Finnish schoolteacher and Social Democratic politician. He served in the Parliament of Finland in 1909–1911 and again in 1914–1917, becoming one of the leading Social Democrats in Kuopio at the start of the 20th century. Aakula was born in Mynämäki. A teacher by profession, he was a Social Democrat and was elected to the Parliament of Finland from the Western Kuopio Province constituency. Aakula was a member of the parliament 1909–1911 and 1914–1917. He died in Karttula, aged 61.

== Early life and teaching career ==
Aakula was born in Mynämäki to tenant farmer Jeremia Matinpoika Aakula (1830–1912) and Johanna Heikintytär Juhala (1824–1875). After local primary schooling and two years at the Uusikaupunki Realschule, he attended the Jyväskylä Teacher Seminary, graduating in 1891.

He taught in Mynämäki (1891–1892), Oripää (1892–1894), the Central Finland College in Äänekoski (1894–1898), Kangasala (1898–1902) and Kuopio (1902–1918).

While in Kangasala he chaired the municipal board. After moving to Kuopio he helped found the Kuopio Workers’ Cooperative Store and the dramatic society that later became the Kuopio Workers’ Theatre. He joined the Kuopio Workers’ Association in spring 1905, later chairing it, and was active in launching the newspaper Savon Työmies, the Savon Workers’ Printing House and the Savon Workers’ Savings Bank.

== Parliament and public activity ==
Beyond municipal politics Aakula sat on the supervisory board of SOK, the Finnish Cooperative Wholesale Society. He entered Parliament in October 1909, replacing Antti Mäkelin, and was re-elected in 1910, 1913 and 1916.

== Civil War and imprisonment ==
After the February Revolution of 1917 the Tokoi Senate offered him the post of governor of Kuopio Province, but he declined. During the Finnish Civil War he tried to mediate during the Battle of Kuopio; when the Whites prevailed he was arrested, first held in the Kuopio prison camp and later at Isosaari in Helsinki.

In August 1918 a court sentenced him to three years for “assisting treason” because of a strike-speech he had delivered the previous autumn, but he was paroled immediately.

== Personal life ==
In 1895 Aakula married schoolteacher Hilda Maria Keinänen (1870–1958). They had six children, four of whom died in childhood.

== Later life ==
On release Aakula became managing director of the Kuopio Workers’ Cooperative Store. He resigned in 1920 when Communists won control of its board and helped found the Työkansa Cooperative. When Communists also took over the Kuopio Workers’ Association he joined the new Social Democratic Workers’ Association in the city. Despite chronic illness, worsened by imprisonment, he served on the supervisory boards of OTK, KK and the insurance company Tulenturva and sat on the Kuopio City Council. Shortly before his death he helped plan a new edition of Savon Työmies. He died after a long illness at his summer cottage in Airaksela, Karttula, on 11 June 1928 and was buried in Kuopio Cemetery.
