= Mietoinen =

Mietoinen Mietoinen – Mietois
- Former municipality
- Mietoisten kunta Mietois kommun
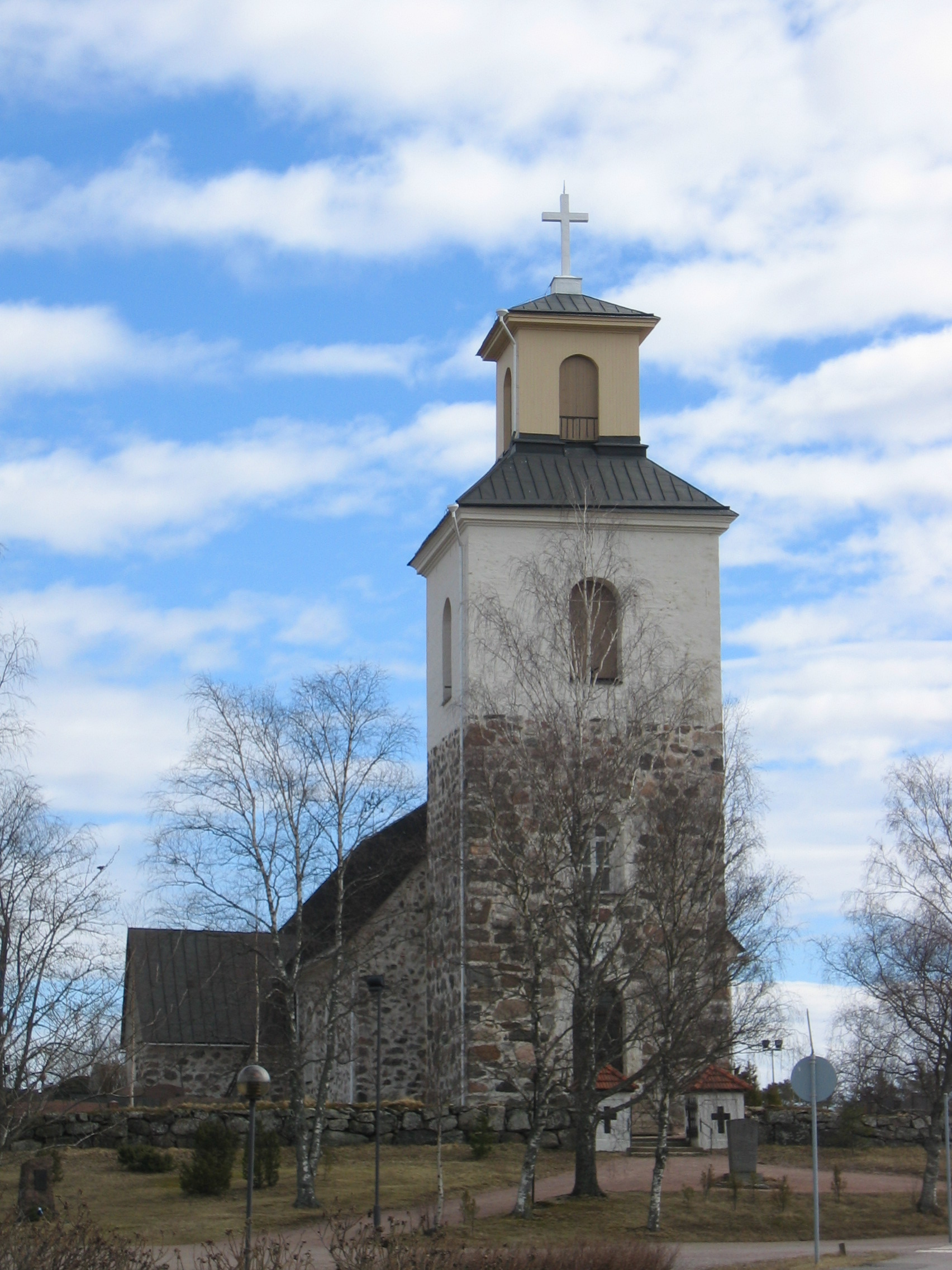
- Mietoinen Church

- Coat of arms

- Location of Mietoinen in Finland
- Coordinates: 60°37′35″N 021°55′45″E
- Country: Finland
- Region: Southwest Finland
- Sub-region: Vakka-Suomi
- Charter: 1865
- Merged with Mynämäki: 2007

Area
  - Total: 73.55 km^{2} (28.40 sq mi)
  - Land: 59.50 km^{2} (22.97 sq mi)
  - Water: 14.05 km^{2} (5.42 sq mi)

Population (2006-12-31)
  - Total: 1,697
  - Density: 28.52/km^{2} (73.87/sq mi)
- Time zone: UTC+2 (EET)
  - Summer (DST): UTC+3 (EEST)
- Climate: Dfb
- Website: www.mietoinen.fi

Mietoinen (Finnish: [ˈmie̯toi̯nen]; Swedish: Mietois) is a former municipality of Finland. It was joined to the municipality of Mynämäki in the beginning of the year 2007.

Mietoinen is located in the province of Western Finland and is part of the Southwest Finland region. The municipality had a population of 1,697 (31 December 2006) and it covered a land area of 59.50 square kilometres (22.97 sq mi). The population density was 28.52 inhabitants per square kilometre (73.9/sq mi).

The municipality was unilingually Finnish.
