= Taivassalo =

Taivassalo Tövsala
- Municipality
- Taivassalon kunta Tövsala kommun
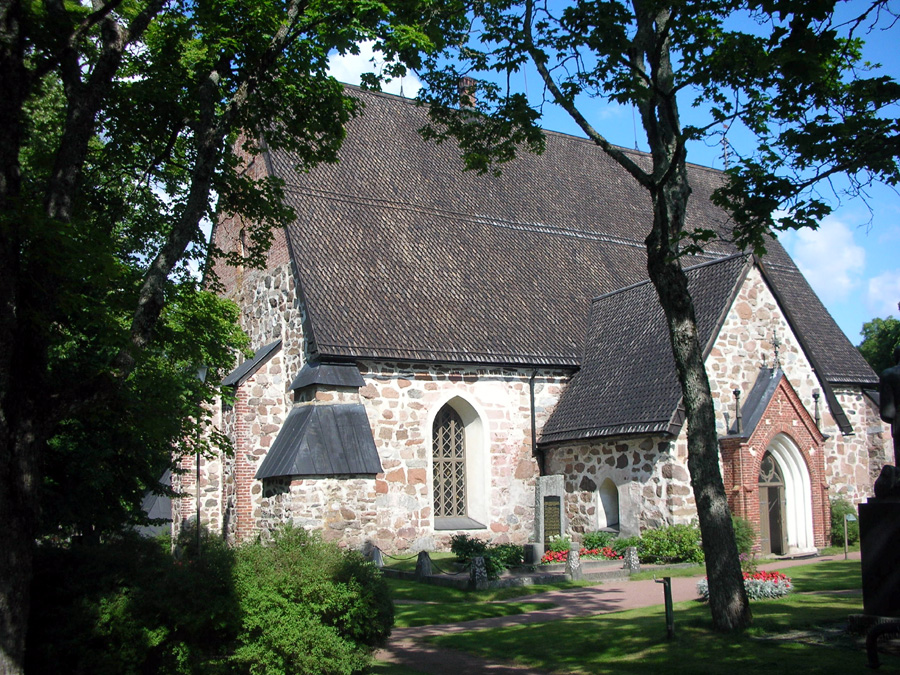
- Taivassalo Church

- Coat of arms

- Location of Taivassalo in Finland
- Interactive map of Taivassalo
- Coordinates: 60°33.7′N 021°36.5′E
- Country: Finland
- Region: Southwest Finland
- Sub-region: Vakka-Suomi
- Founded: 1155

Government
  - Municipal manager: Sanna Häkli

Area (2018-01-01)
  - Total: 217.68 km^{2} (84.05 sq mi)
  - Land: 140.33 km^{2} (54.18 sq mi)
  - Water: 77.23 km^{2} (29.82 sq mi)
  - Rank: 284th largest in Finland

Population (2025-12-31)
  - Total: 1,707
  - Rank: 269th largest in Finland
  - Density: 12.16/km^{2} (31.5/sq mi)

Population by native language
  - Finnish: 90.7% (official)
  - Swedish: 0.8%
  - Others: 8.4%

Population by age
  - 0 to 14: 13.4%
  - 15 to 64: 52.6%
  - 65 or older: 34%
- Time zone: UTC+02:00 (EET)
  - Summer (DST): UTC+03:00 (EEST)
- Climate: Dfb
- Website: www.taivassalo.fi

Taivassalo (Finnish: [ˈtɑi̯ʋɑsˌsɑlo]; Swedish: Tövsala) is a municipality of Finland, about 50 kilometres (31 mi) from the city of Turku. It is located in the Southwest Finland region. The municipality has a population of 1,707 (31 December 2025) and covers an area of 217.68 square kilometres (84.05 sq mi) of which 77.23 km^{2} (29.82 sq mi) is water. The population density is 12.16 inhabitants per square kilometre (31.5/sq mi).

The municipality is unilingually Finnish. Its neighboring municipalities are Kustavi, Masku, Mynämäki, Naantali, Uusikaupunki and Vehmaa.

The medieval sailing ship appearing in the coat of arms of Taivassalo refers to the maritime connections the coastguard already had during the Northern Crusades, as well as to the medieval naval weaponry, the surviving information of which comes from Taivassalo itself. The coat of arms was designed by Olof Eriksson, and the Taivassalo municipal council approved it at its meeting on October 21, 1953. The Ministry of the Interior approved the coat of arms for use on February 11, 1954.

== Name ==
Taivassalo literally means "sky island", however J. A. Lopmeri and Elias Lönnrot theorized that the initial word was originally taival/taipale, as the area was originally an island, by the time of the naming it may have been connected to the mainland by a thin isthmus (taipale) as a result of post-glacial rebound. The Swedish name Tövsala is an adaptation of the Finnish name.

== History ==
Taivassalo was first mentioned in 1350 as Thowesalu, when it was already a separate parish. It also included Velkua, Kustavi (originally Kivimaa) and Iniö until the 19th century.

== Notable people ==
- Emma Irene Åström (1847–1934)
- Reima Salonen (born 1955)
