= Laitila =

Laitila Letala
- Town
- Laitilan kaupunki Letala stad
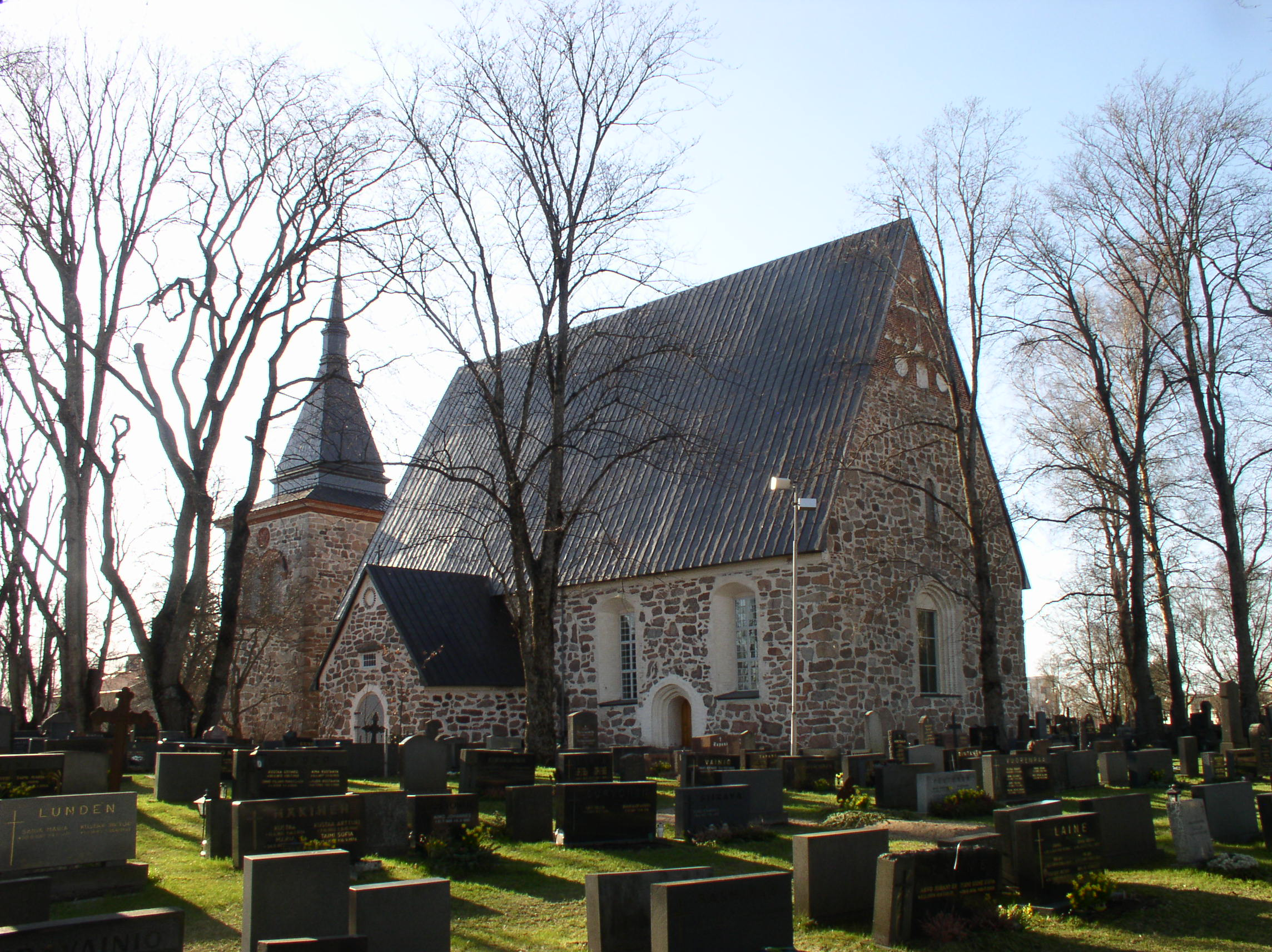
- Laitila Church

- Coat of arms
- Nickname: Egg Capital of Finland
- Location of Laitila in Finland
- Interactive map of Laitila
- Coordinates: 60°53′N 021°42′E
- Country: Finland
- Region: Southwest Finland
- Sub-region: Vakka-Suomi
- Charter: 1868
- City rights: 1986

Government
  - Town manager: Johanna Luukkonen

Area (2018-01-01)
  - Total: 545.32 km^{2} (210.55 sq mi)
  - Land: 531.88 km^{2} (205.36 sq mi)
  - Water: 13.65 km^{2} (5.27 sq mi)
  - Rank: 164th largest in Finland

Population (2025-12-31)
  - Total: 8,400
  - Rank: 114th largest in Finland
  - Density: 15.79/km^{2} (40.9/sq mi)

Population by native language
  - Finnish: 85.6% (official)
  - Swedish: 0.3%
  - Others: 14.1%

Population by age
  - 0 to 14: 16.2%
  - 15 to 64: 58.4%
  - 65 or older: 25.3%
- Time zone: UTC+02:00 (EET)
  - Summer (DST): UTC+03:00 (EEST)
- Climate: Dfb
- Website: www.laitila.fi/en/

Laitila (Finnish: [ˈlɑi̯tilɑ]; Swedish: Letala) is a town and a municipality of Finland. It is located in the Southwest Finland region, and it is 59 kilometres (37 mi) from Laitila to Turku. The municipality has a population of 8,400 (31 December 2025) and covers an area of 545.32 square kilometres (210.55 sq mi) of which 13.65 km^{2} (5.27 sq mi) is water. The population density is 15.79 inhabitants per square kilometre (40.9/sq mi). The municipality is monolingually Finnish.

Laitila is renowned for its poultry farms and "egg festival" (Laitilan Munamarkkinat), which is why the subject of the municipal coat of arms of Laitila also refers to the parish's fame for chicken care. There is much demand for Laitila-based chicken eggs, as the local egg producer company Munax, among other things, has even planned to export eggs to South Korea. Laitila has also been called the "egg capital of Finland".

== Culture ==
Laitila has many Iron Age antiquities, the most famous of which are the so-called the warrior's grave of Kodjala. Finland's oldest glass object, the Roman-era drinking horn, has been found in Laitila's Soukainen village. The nationally significant built cultural environments defined by the Finnish Heritage Agency in 2009 in Laitila include the Untamala and Suontaka villages and the Koukkela's the peasant house of Kauppila.

== People ==
- Kaarlo Heininen (1853–1926)
- Pasi Saarela (born 1973)
- Mika Kares (born 1978)
- Valle Mäkelä (born 1986)
- Markus Seikola (born 1992)
- Susanna Tapani (born 1993)

== See also ==
- Laitilan Wirvoitusjuomatehdas
