= Vehmaa =

Vehmaa Vemo
- Municipality
- Vehmaan kunta Vemo kommun
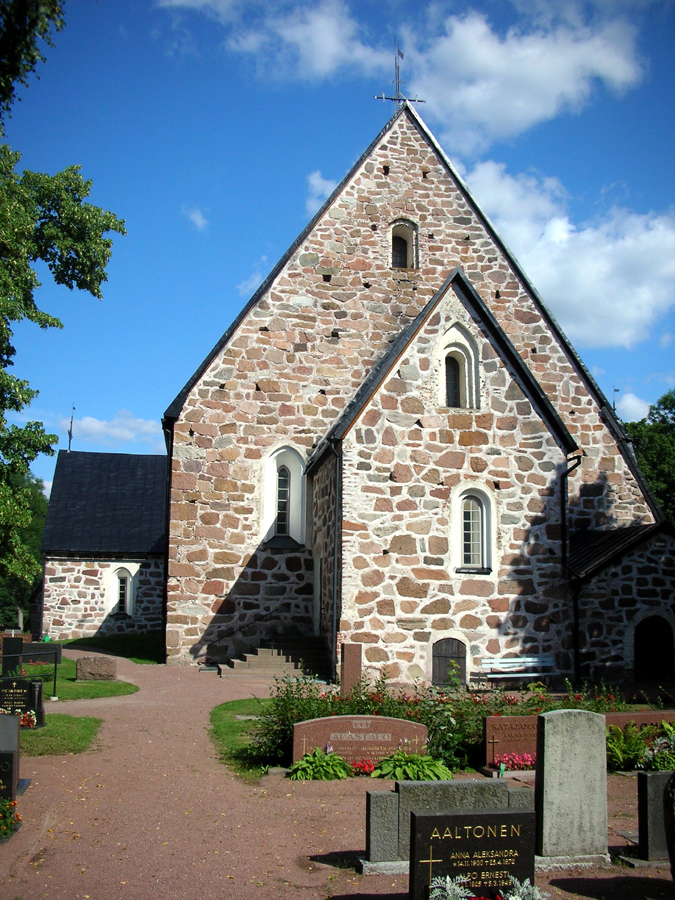
- Vehmaa Church

- Coat of arms

- Location of Vehmaa in Finland
- Interactive map of Vehmaa
- Coordinates: 60°41.2′N 021°42.8′E
- Country: Finland
- Region: Southwest Finland
- Sub-region: Vakka-Suomi
- Charter: 1869

Government
  - Municipal manager: Pekka Seppälä

Area (2018-01-01)
  - Total: 202.09 km^{2} (78.03 sq mi)
  - Land: 188.88 km^{2} (72.93 sq mi)
  - Water: 13.32 km^{2} (5.14 sq mi)
  - Rank: 266th largest in Finland

Population (2025-12-31)
  - Total: 2,263
  - Rank: 246th largest in Finland
  - Density: 11.98/km^{2} (31.0/sq mi)

Population by native language
  - Finnish: 92.2% (official)
  - Swedish: 0.6%
  - Others: 7.2%

Population by age
  - 0 to 14: 14.4%
  - 15 to 64: 56.5%
  - 65 or older: 29%
- Time zone: UTC+02:00 (EET)
  - Summer (DST): UTC+03:00 (EEST)
- Climate: Dfb
- Website: www.vehmaa.fi/in-english/

Vehmaa (Finnish pronunciation: [ˈʋehmɑː]; Swedish: Vemo) is a municipality of Finland. It is located in the province of Western Finland and is part of the Southwest Finland region. The municipality has a population of 2,263 (31 December 2025) and covers an area of 202.09 square kilometres (78.03 sq mi) of which 13.32 km^{2} (5.14 sq mi) is water. The population density is 11.98 inhabitants per square kilometre (31.0/sq mi).

The municipality is unilingually Finnish.

Vehmaa is known of their red Granite Balmoral red, as well as being the birthplace of Albin Stenroos who won the gold medal in the marathon at the 1924 Olympics. According to Traficom, Vehmaa is the fifth most motorized municipality in Finland with 628 cars per 1000 inhabitants.

== Vehmaa Church ==
The stone church of Vehmaa was probably built between 1425–1440, and it's one of the oldest still existing churches in Western Finland. The pulpit was installed in the 17th century, and the other interior is from the 1840s. The church was dedicated to Saint Margaret.

== Notable people ==
- Timo Aaltonen (born 1969), shot putter
- Waldemar Bergroth (1852–1928), Lutheran clergyman and politician
- Outi Heiskanen (1937–2022), artist
- Janne Jaakkola (born 1967), general
- Pertti Karppinen (born 1953), rower
- Albin Stenroos (1889–1971), runner
