= Kustavi =

Kustavi Gustavs
- Municipality
- Kustavin kunta Gustavs kommun
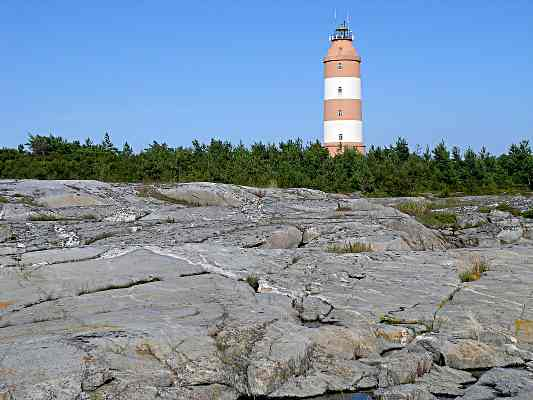
- The Isokari Lighthouse in Kustavi

- Coat of arms

- Location of Kustavi in Finland
- Interactive map of Kustavi
- Coordinates: 60°32.8′N 021°21.5′E
- Country: Finland
- Region: Southwest Finland
- Sub-region: Vakka-Suomi
- Charter: 1874
- Named for: Gustav III

Government
  - Municipal manager: Veijo Katara

Area (2018-01-01)
  - Total: 770.15 km^{2} (297.36 sq mi)
  - Land: 165.84 km^{2} (64.03 sq mi)
  - Water: 603.45 km^{2} (232.99 sq mi)
  - Rank: 273rd largest in Finland

Population (2025-12-31)
  - Total: 972
  - Rank: 296th largest in Finland
  - Density: 5.86/km^{2} (15.2/sq mi)

Population by native language
  - Finnish: 93.2% (official)
  - Swedish: 2%
  - Others: 4.8%

Population by age
  - 0 to 14: 9%
  - 15 to 64: 51.8%
  - 65 or older: 39.2%
- Time zone: UTC+02:00 (EET)
  - Summer (DST): UTC+03:00 (EEST)
- Website: kustavi.fi/en/

Kustavi (Finnish pronunciation: [ˈkustɑʋi]; Swedish: Gustavs) is a municipality of Finland. It is in the province of Western Finland and is part of the Southwest Finland region. The municipality has a population of 972 (31 December 2025), which makes it the smallest municipality in southwest Finland in terms of population. It covers an area of 770.15 square kilometres (297.36 sq mi) of which 603.45 km^{2} (232.99 sq mi) is water. The population density is 5.86 per square kilometre (15.2/sq mi).

There are over 2,000 isles within the municipal area. The municipality is a very popular summer resort and contains over 2,800 summer cottages. The population increases tenfold during the summer months. The larger events are Volter Kilpi literature week in July and Salmon market (Lohimarkkinat) in August. The basic services in the municipality include three groceries, a liquor store, a library and a bank. There are two ferry connections to Brändö and Iniö.

The municipality is unilingually Finnish even though it is located adjacent to the Swedish speaking Åland-region. The municipality is named after King Gustav III of Sweden.

== Climate ==
Climate data for Kustavi Isokari (1991–2020 normals, extremes 1995– present)
Month	Jan	Feb	Mar	Apr	May	Jun	Jul	Aug	Sep	Oct	Nov	Dec	Year
Record high °C (°F)	7.9 (46.2)	6.5 (43.7)	9.2 (48.6)	17.9 (64.2)	26.1 (79.0)	28.2 (82.8)	29.0 (84.2)	28.0 (82.4)	25.5 (77.9)	16.6 (61.9)	12.6 (54.7)	9.3 (48.7)	29.0 (84.2)
Daily mean °C (°F)	−1.5 (29.3)	−2.9 (26.8)	−0.7 (30.7)	2.8 (37.0)	7.7 (45.9)	12.7 (54.9)	16.8 (62.2)	16.9 (62.4)	12.9 (55.2)	7.8 (46.0)	3.6 (38.5)	0.9 (33.6)	6.4 (43.5)
Record low °C (°F)	−24.9 (−12.8)	−22.3 (−8.1)	−18.4 (−1.1)	−10.1 (13.8)	−1.3 (29.7)	4.1 (39.4)	9.6 (49.3)	5.9 (42.6)	4.1 (39.4)	−4.0 (24.8)	−11.7 (10.9)	−21.0 (−5.8)	−24.9 (−12.8)
Source 1: FMI climatological normals for Finland 1991–2020
Source 2: Record highs and lows 1995–present
