= Finnish Navy Band =

Official representative band of the Finnish Navy

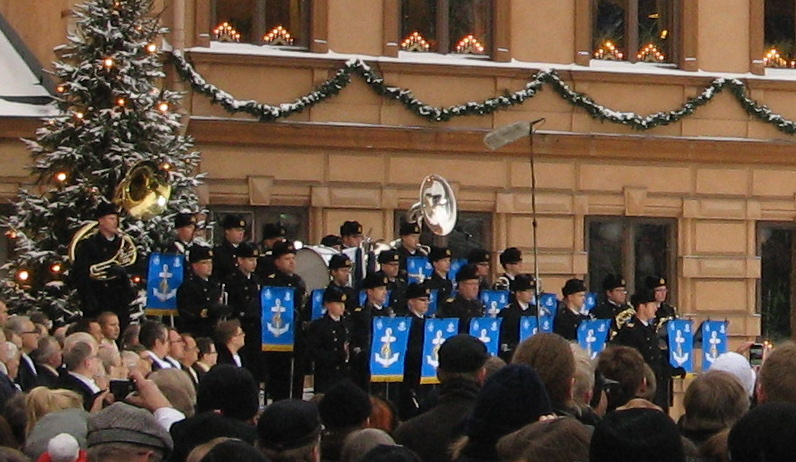
The band in December 2009

The Finnish Navy Band (Finnish: Laivaston soittokunta, LAIVSK) is the official representative band of the Finnish Navy serving from its headquarters in the southwestern coastal city of Turku. The band's area of responsibility includes Turku and western Finland. The 32-member military band is currently led by Senior conductor Lieutenant commander (Mus.) Jarkko Aaltonen. Musicians work as part of the Navy Command Finland in the same city they are based in.

== History and present events ==
It was established in 1919, two years after Finland gained its independence from the Russian Empire. Increased cooperation with the school of music has taken the form of soloist concerts and traineeships for students. Like all Finnish Defence Force bands, it provides musical accompaniment for ceremonial events in relation to the country, and in the band's case, events connected to the Finnish Navy. The band's repertoire includes all types of music – from ceremonial pieces to classical and jazz songs. It is usually active on naval ships, naval bases, and military installations, performing for the sailors and officers who are located at these locations during these visits. Every summer, the band performs at the Finnish President’s summer home of Kultaranta in Naantali.

== Ensembles ==
The following five units are ensembles of the navy band:

- Ceremonial Band - It is used during events that require marching and/or events of state importance.
- Concert Band - It is used during mostly during indoor events and, like its name implies, concerts and events of that nature.
- Brass Septet - Established in 2013 due to the reform of military bands which took place that same year.
- Brass Quintet
- Wind Quintet
- Conscript Band of the Finnish Navy - The conscript band plays light music for example in school concerts, garrison tours, MIL-Espa performances, and various internal events of the Finnish Defence Forces. The conscripts also sometimes fill in with the professional band.
- The Sea Lion Drum Corps - The drum corps was founded in 2020 and it performs as a part of the Finnish Navy Band, most often accompanying the band in parades and tattoos.
- Small Entertainment Orchestra - The 11-member ensemble has performed on dance floors, at summer concerts, and in clubs. In addition to featuring its own vocal soloists, the group has also had the opportunity to perform with several top Finnish artists. Besides playing the latest chart hits, it regularly arranges its own themed concerts.

== Instrumentation ==
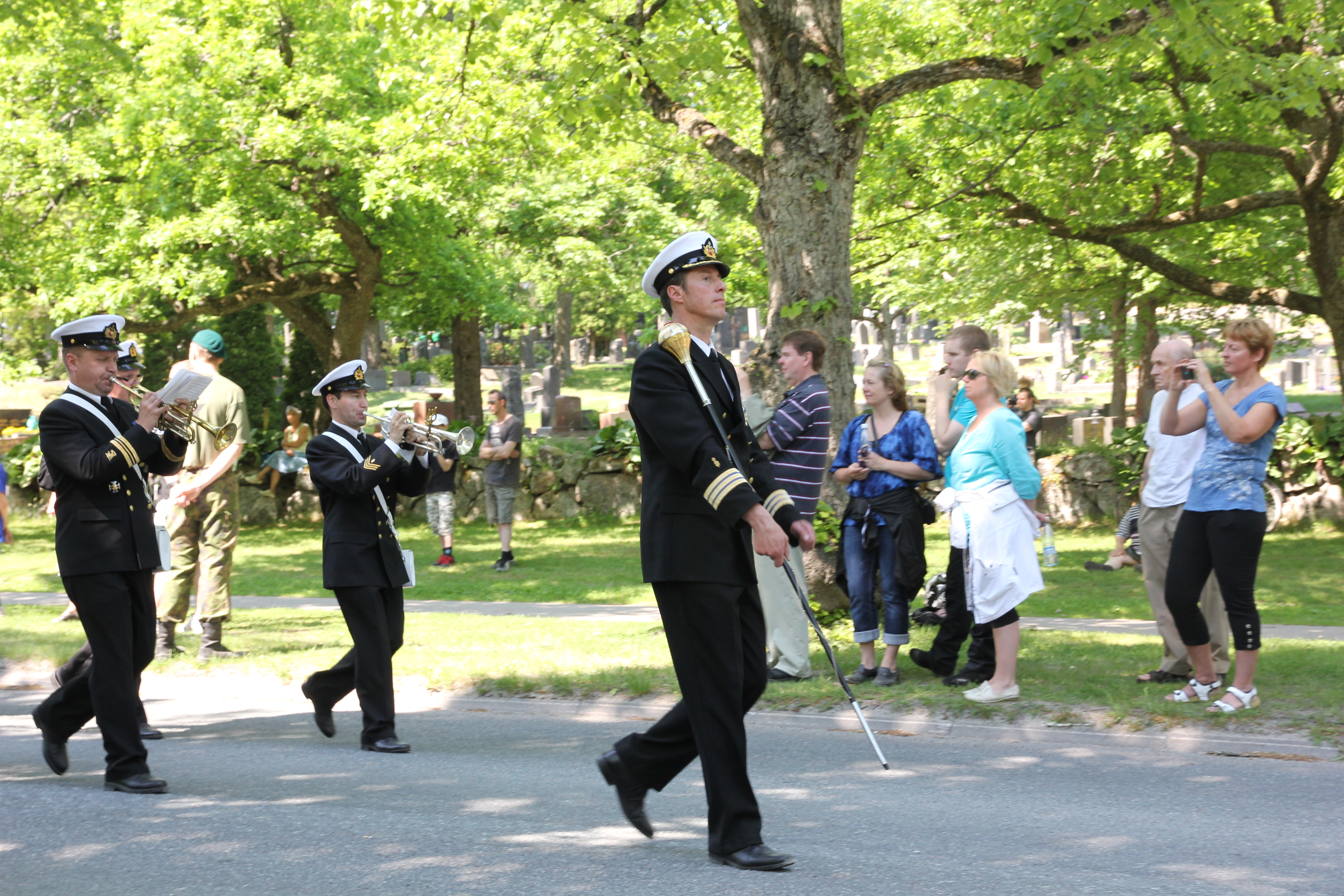
The band on parade in June 2013

- 2 flutes / piccolos
- 5 clarinets
- 1 bassoon
- 3 saxophones
- 4 french horns
- 6 trumpets
- 3 trombones
- 2 baritone horns
- 2 tubas
- 3 percussion
- 1 piano
