= Alfred Kordelin =

Finnish businessman

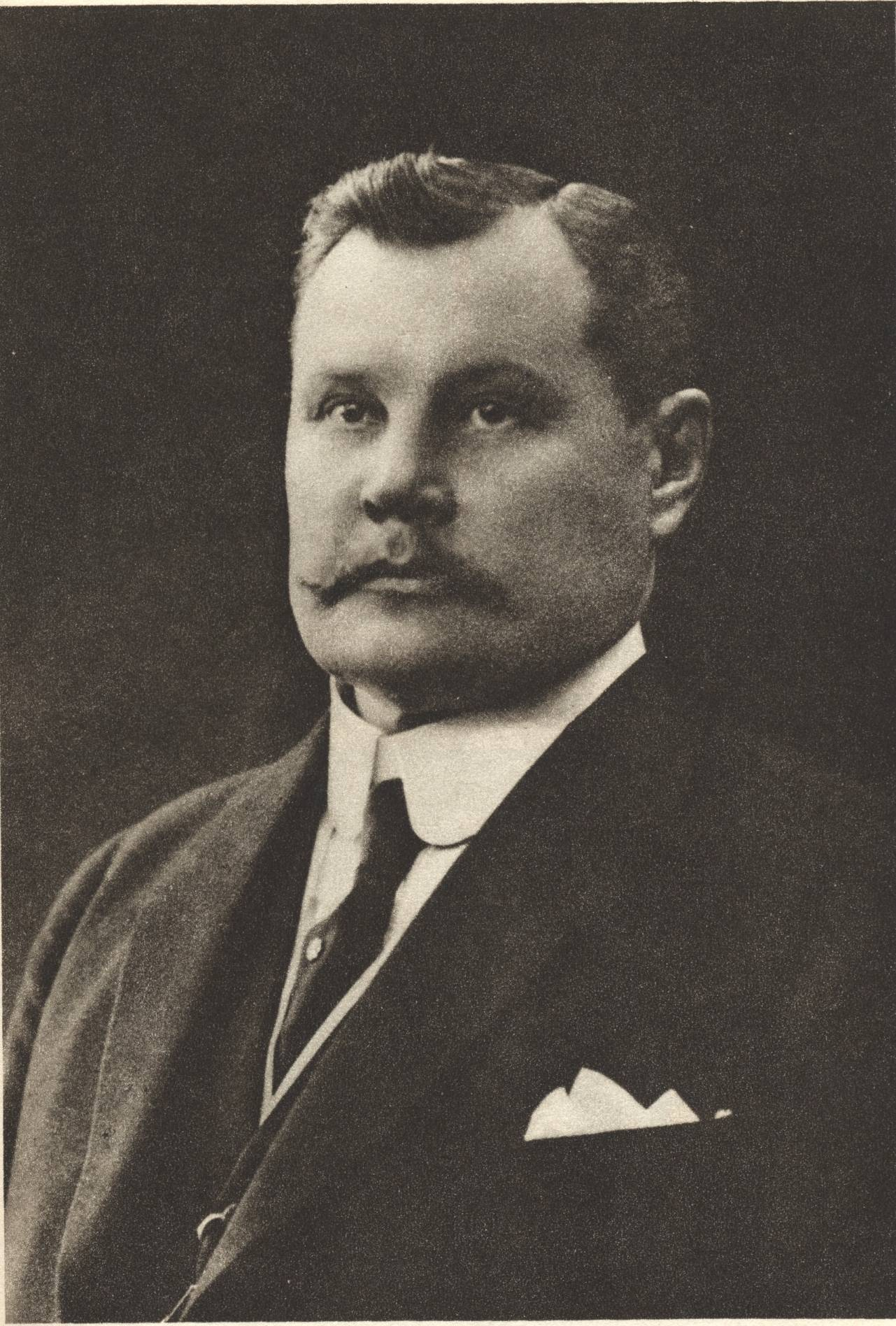
Alfred Kordelin

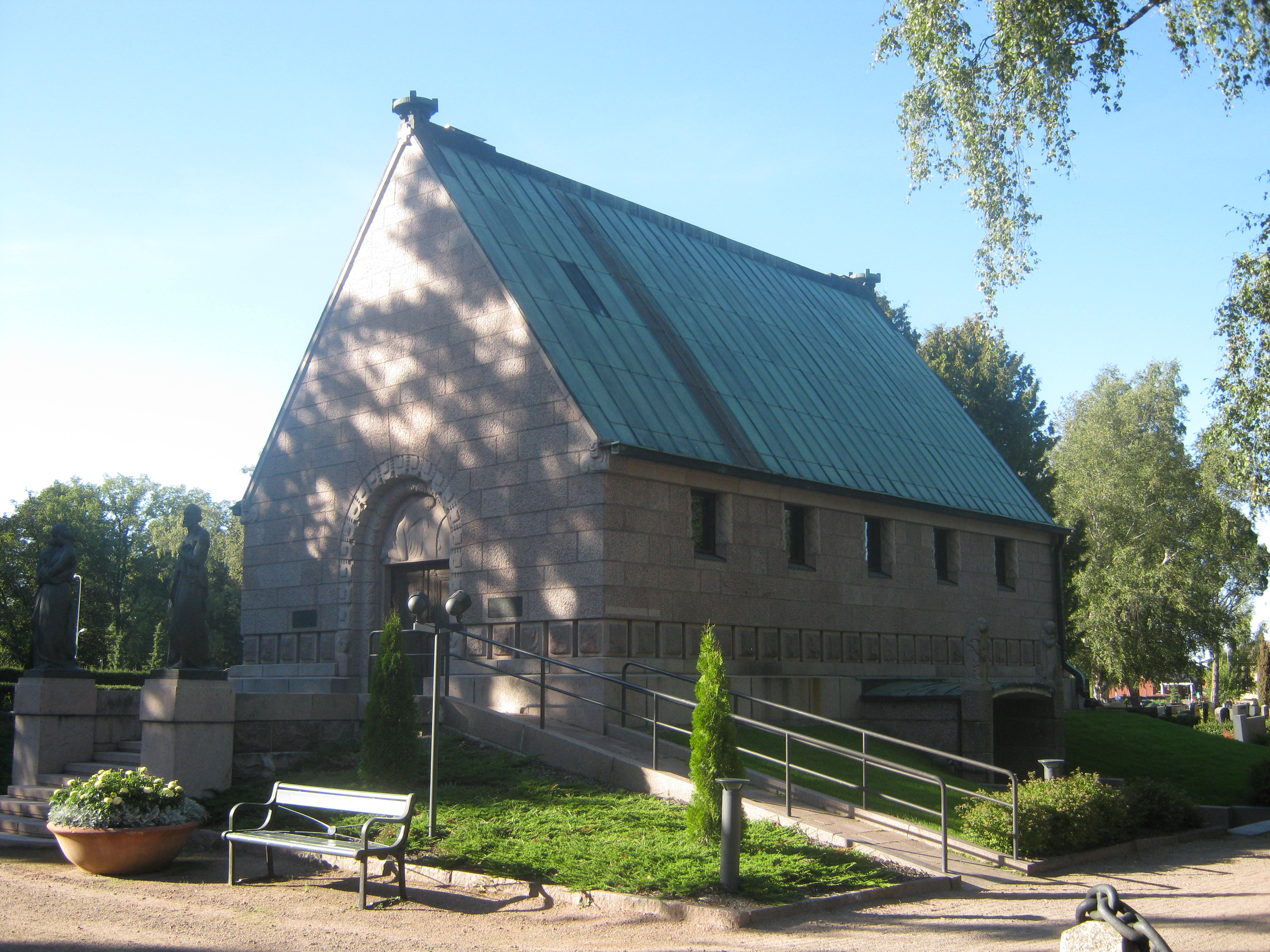
Alfred Kordelin's burial site, the Kordelin Chapel

Alfred Kordelin (6 November 1868, Rauma – 7 November 1917, Mommila, Hausjärvi) was a Finnish industrialist, businessman, entrepreneur, and a major philanthropist. Kordelin was one of the richest Finnish entrepreneurs of his time.

== Life ==
Kordelin had little formal education. He was the son of a poor seaman from Rauma. Kordelin invested wisely in the fields of weaving, shipbuilding and metalworking, becoming one of Finland's richest men. Risto Ryti, who later became President of Finland, was Alfred Kordelin's legal advisor and close friend. Kordelin owned the Mommila and Jokioinen manor houses and a steam sawmill in Reposaari. He invested a large amount of money in different companies.

Kordelin organised the building of a summerhouse and estate in Naantali, called Kultaranta. The main building was made of granite and was completed in 1916. Kordelin himself spent only one summer at Kultaranta.

== Death ==
On 7 November 1917, Kordelin was kidnapped by a group of Red Guards. He was then murdered by a Russian sailor in the so-called Mommila skirmish that followed.

He was buried in Rauma on a chapel which was drawn by Finnish architect Lars Sonck.

== Foundation and art ==
Kordelin never married and was childless. Upon his death he bequeathed all his property to a Finnish cultural foundation in his will, with this money the Alfred Kordelin Foundation was later founded in 1920. The foundation gives out several million euros annually in grants and awards to promote literature, science, art, and public education in Finland. This includes funding for translation of works into Finnish, but also grants for the translation of Finnish Literature into other languages.

After his death, Kultaranta was acquired by the Government of Finland from Kordelin's foundation. Today, it is used as the President of Finland's summer residence. The money from Kordelin's estate, through the foundation, was also used for the funding of a museum art collection. It primarily includes works from the Finnish art scene of the 1920s and 30s and is referred to as the 'Alfred Kordelin Collection'.
