= Keijo =

Keijo may refer to:

- Keijō, a former name of Seoul, South Korea
- Keijo (given name), a Finnish given name
- Keijo (manga), a Japanese manga series
