= Luonnonmaa =

Island in Naantali, Finland

Coordinates: 60°27′N 22°00′E

Luonnonmaa is an island in Southwest Finland. The island is in the Finnish Archipelago Sea (Finnish: Saaristomeri) region of the Baltic Sea, and located in the southernmost part of Finnish territorial waters. With an area of 44.0 square kilometers (17.0 sq mi), Luonnonmaa is one the tens of thousands of islands, islets, and skerries that constitute the Finnish Archipelago.

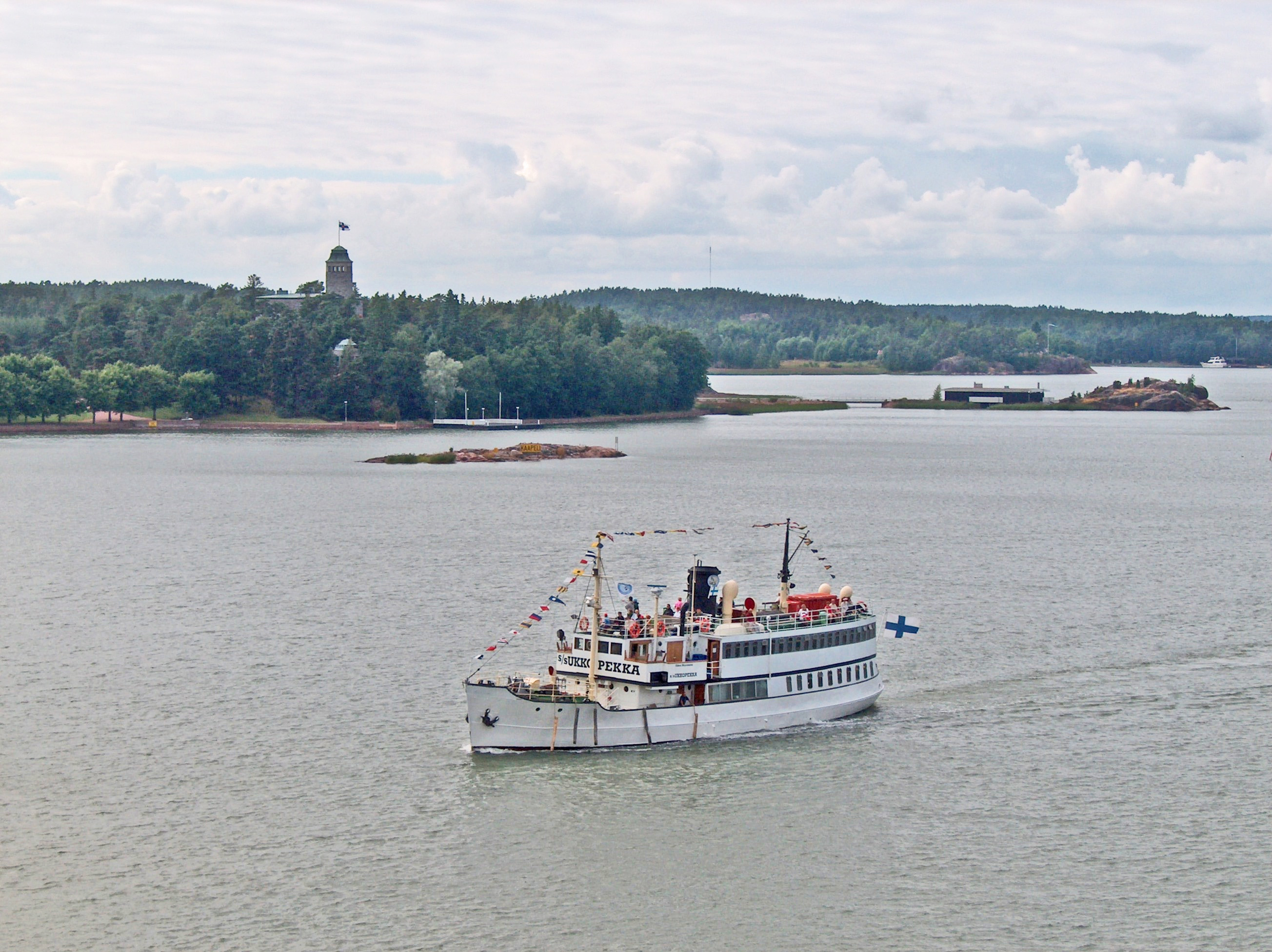
View of Luonnonmaa Island in the Finnish Archipelago Sea, part of the municipality of Naantali, Finland. Kultaranta is the towered structure in the distance. In the foreground is the steamship S/S Ukkopekka.

Luonnonmaa is part of the municipality of Naantali, a summer resort town of around 20,000 people and major tourism destination located within the Turku metropolitan area. Naantali proper consists of a mainland portion in addition to approximately 1,000 islands, of which Luonnonmaa is the largest. Luonnonmaa forms most of Naantali's area but has only a fraction of its permanent population.

Luonnonmaa is home to Kultaranta, the official summer residence of the President of Finland.
