= Jöns Budde =

Bridgettine monk

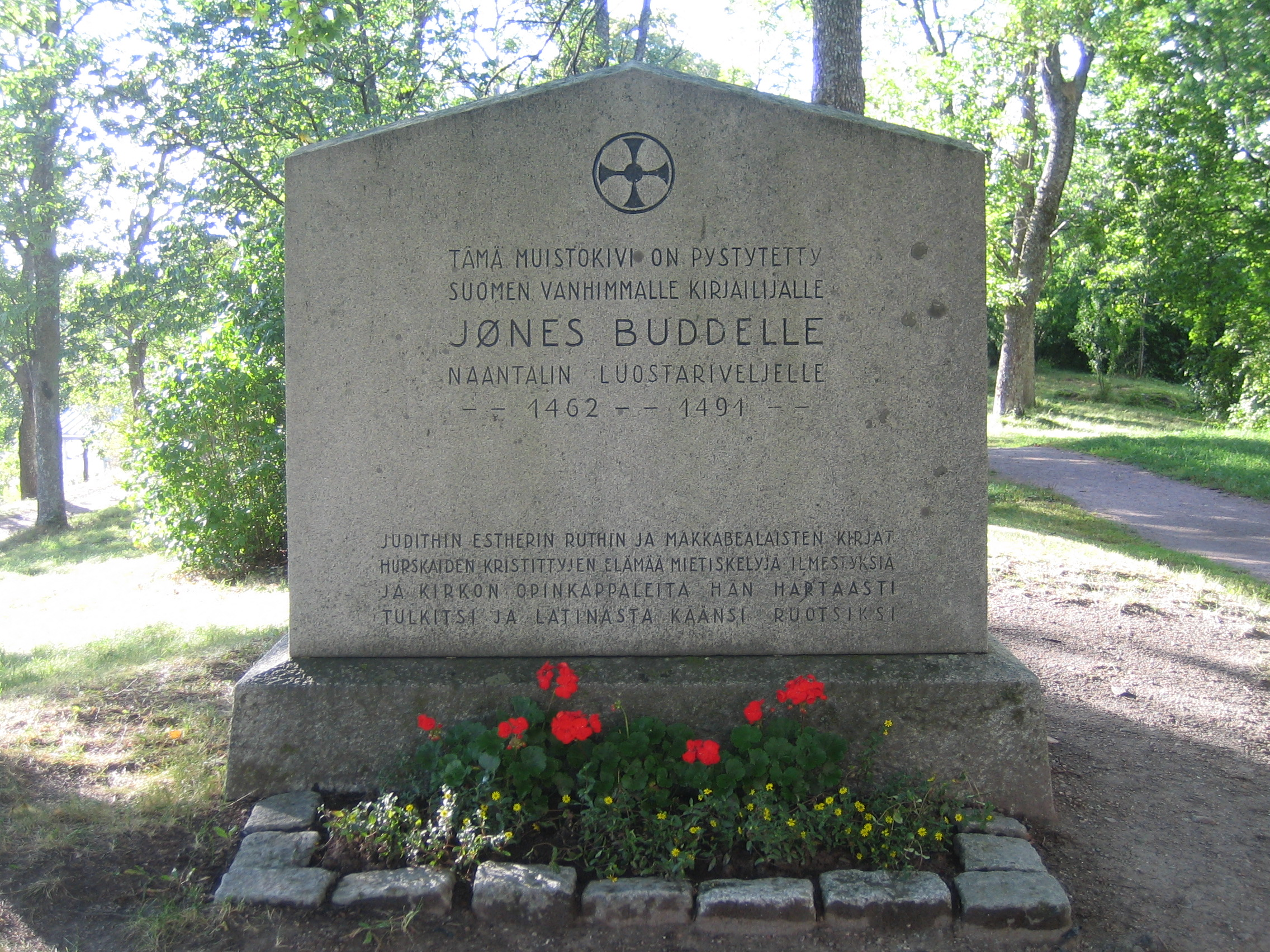
Jöns Budde memorial

Jöns Budde, OSsS (sometimes spelled as Joens Budde or Jønes Budde) (c. 1435 – c. 1493) was a Bridgettine monk from the Bridgettine convent Vallis gratiae, the first convent for women in Finland, located in Naantali, near Turku, Finland – at the time part of the Kalmar Union (1397–1523).

Jöns Budde chiefly translated from Latin to Swedish, but also wrote works of his own. His works included the translation of the whole books of the Bible into Swedish. He is the earliest writer known to have translated parts of the Bible into Swedish.

No evidence of the literary work carried on in the Dominican and Franciscan monasteries in Finland has been preserved.
