= Keijo (given name) =

Keijo is a masculine Finnish given name. Notable people with the name include:

- Keijo Huusko (born 1980), Finnish footballer
- Keijo Kuusela (1921–1984), Finnish ice hockey player
- Keijo Liinamaa (1929–1980), Finnish lawyer and politician
- Keijo Parkkinen (born 1965), Finnish orienteer
- Keijo Rosberg (born 1948), Finnish racing driver
- Keijo Säilynoja (born 1970), Finnish ice hockey player
- Keijo Vanhala (1940–2003), Finnish modern pentathlete
- Keijo Virtanen (born 1945), Finnish historian
