= SS Ukkopekka =

Finnish steamship

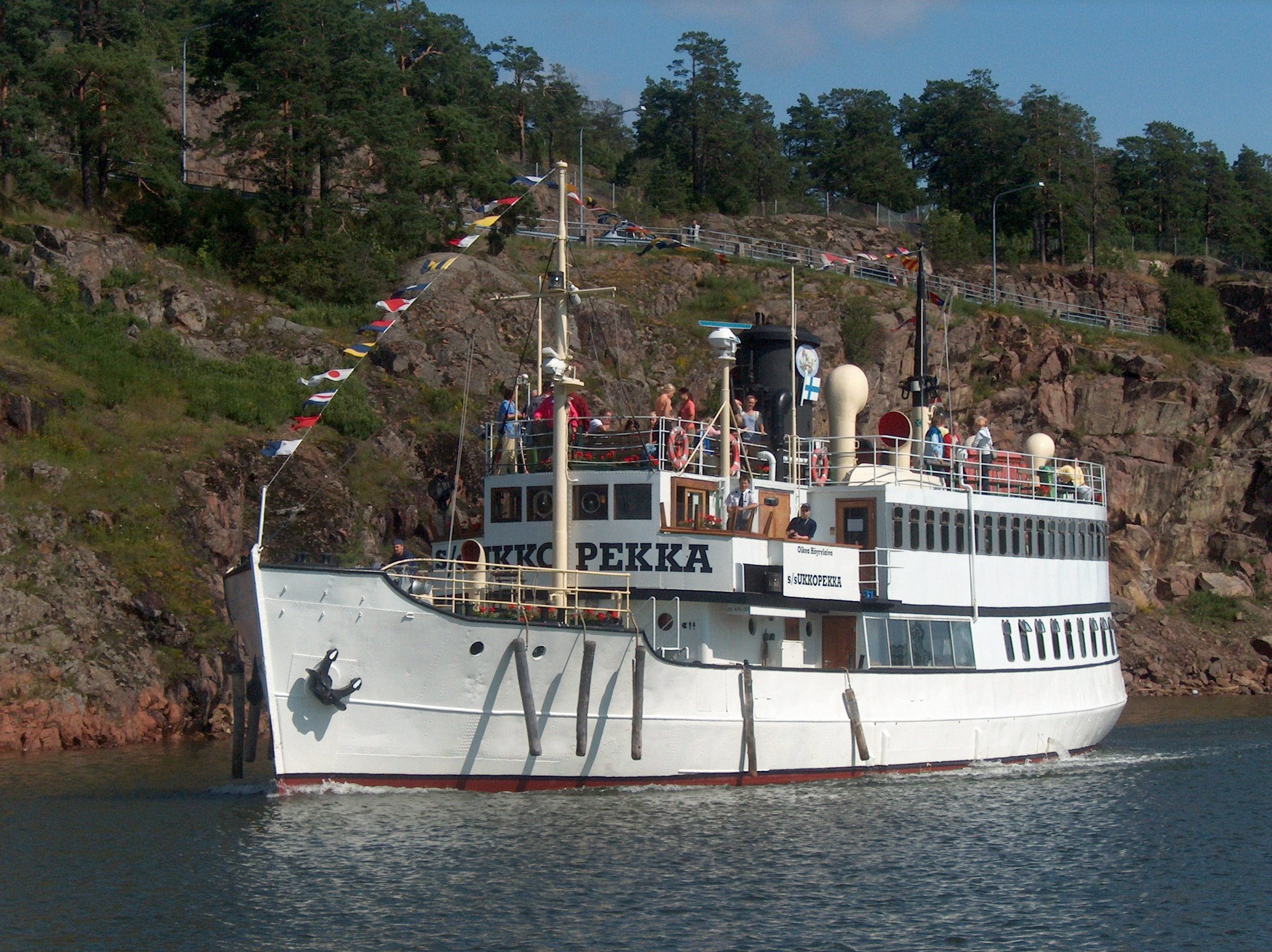
- SS Ukkopekka underway.

History

Finland
- Ordered: 1931
- Builder: Wärtsilä Hietalahti Shipyard, Helsinki, Finland
- Laid down: 1932
- Launched: 1938
- Christened: 1939
- Acquired: 1986
- Commissioned: 1938
- Renamed: SS Ukkopekka in 1986 (ex SS Turku 1938–1980, ex SS Hamina 1981–1985)
- Home port: Turku, Finland
- Status: In Service

General characteristics
- Displacement: 321 metric tons
- Length: 35 m (114 ft 10 in)
- Beam: 7.4 m (24 ft 3 in)
- Draught: 3.2 m (10 ft 6 in)
- Propulsion: Five Finnish-built triple-expansion engines, fire-boiler steam combines operating at 380 hp (280 kW) (The last in operation)
- Speed: 10 knots (19 km/h; 12 mph)
- Range: 5,000 nmi (9,300 km; 5,800 mi)
- Endurance: 300 tons
- Capacity: 199; 150 restaurant seats; 141 passengers

SS Ukkopekka is a Finnish steamship in service as a tourist and heritage attraction.

== History ==
The ship was built at Wärtsilä Hietalahti Shipyard in Helsinki, Finland in 1938 and was at the time a modern, icebreaking inspection vessel. The vessel was the first inspection vessel in independent Finland, built by the Finns for the National Board of Navigation, and her year of manufacture is the same as that of the icebreaker Sisu. She was originally known as Inspection vessel SS Turku and was built to the hull designs of SS Sisu, the only alterations being that of the scale. Thus SS Ukkopekka is probably the last sea-going passenger steamer designed for icebreaking still in active service.

The original engine of SS Ukkopekka was a triple expansion steam engine, built in Helsinki in 1937, and originally designed for warships by the Germans. This engine is probably the last one in active use in the whole world. The engine is in very good condition, as the Finnish state took very good care of it. The boiler was renewed in 1976. The hull is surveyed every two years and it is still in excellent condition—thanks to the high quality steel of 1937.

Soon after she had been built, SS Turku was transferred to military service. The ship served during the Winter War (1939–1940). Despite the extreme conditions of that very harsh winter, the ship was in active service almost without a break. During the Continuation War (1941–1944), the vessel served as a convoy ship in the Åland Sea. After the war, the vessel returned to her original task, serving the National Board of Navigation (pilotage service) as a maintenance and inspection vessel on the Archipelago Sea. Pilot training was part of the daily routine on board, and so was sea mark maintenance.

In her home port, the lower steamship port of Turku, the coal trimmer soon became the subject of many letters to the editor and received complaints from the residents of apartment houses on the banks of the Aura River, who claimed that the soot from her chimneys made their laundry dirty. As a result, the coal stores were replaced by oil containers in 1976, and the boiler hatches were replaced with oil-driven blowers. The rest of the engine has been preserved unaltered, in its original shape. There are five steam engines altogether: the main engine, winch engine, rudder engine and two water pumps. This engine is a popular attraction among steam enthusiasts who come from all over the world to admire the "museum piece”. The engine remains in excellent condition and in active use. It is expected to remain operable for decades.

The Finnish state gave up the vessel in 1979, when a new, larger and more modern inspection vessel was built. After some alteration work on deck and inside the vessel, steamship traffic was reintroduced in the Turku region in the spring of 1986. This marked the first return of traditional steaming in the area since the 1950s.

In the winter of 1987–1988, the ship saloons were enlarged and renovated. The kitchen and storage facilities were also renovated to meet modern requirements and service standards.

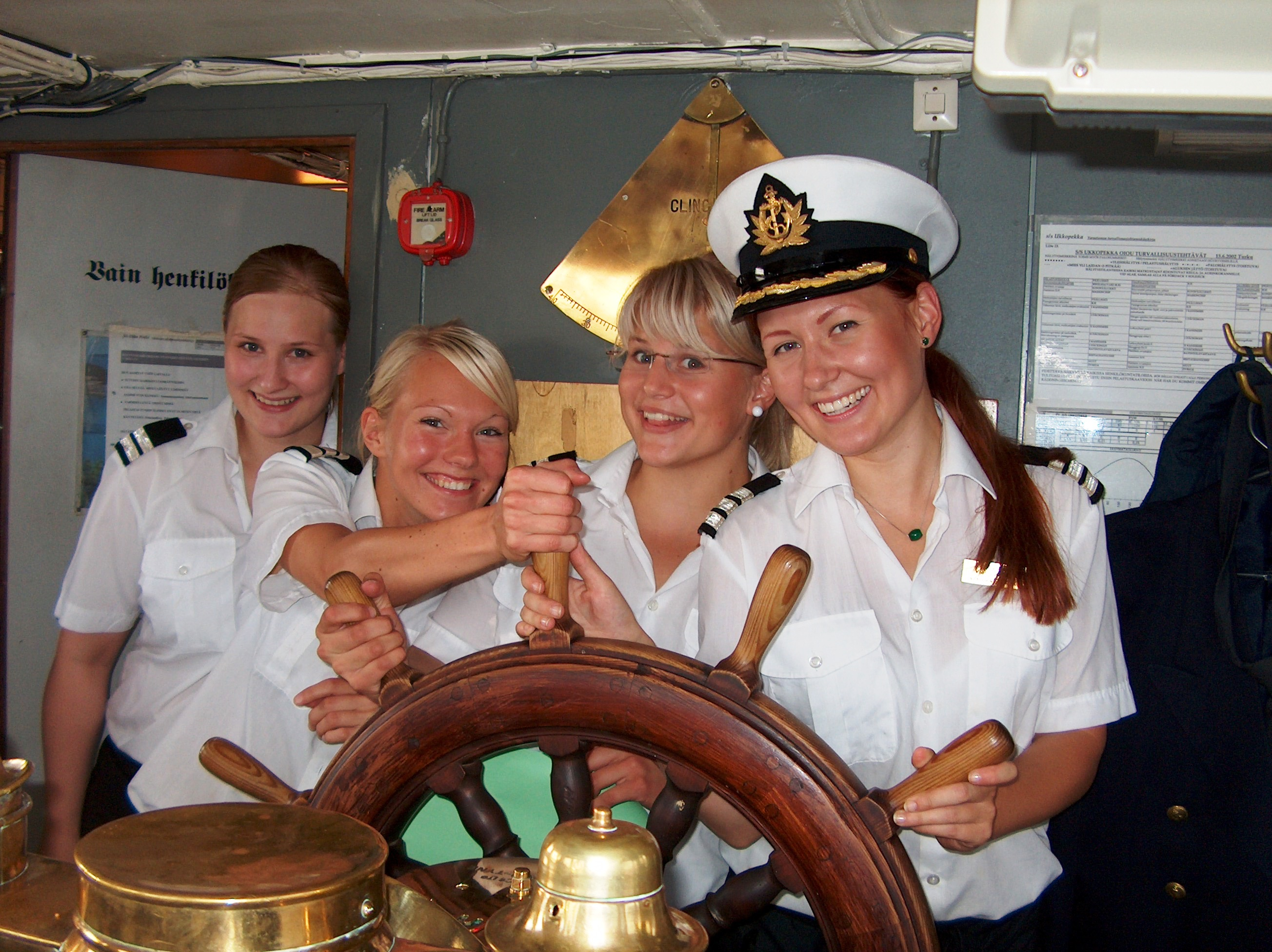
SS Ukkopekka.

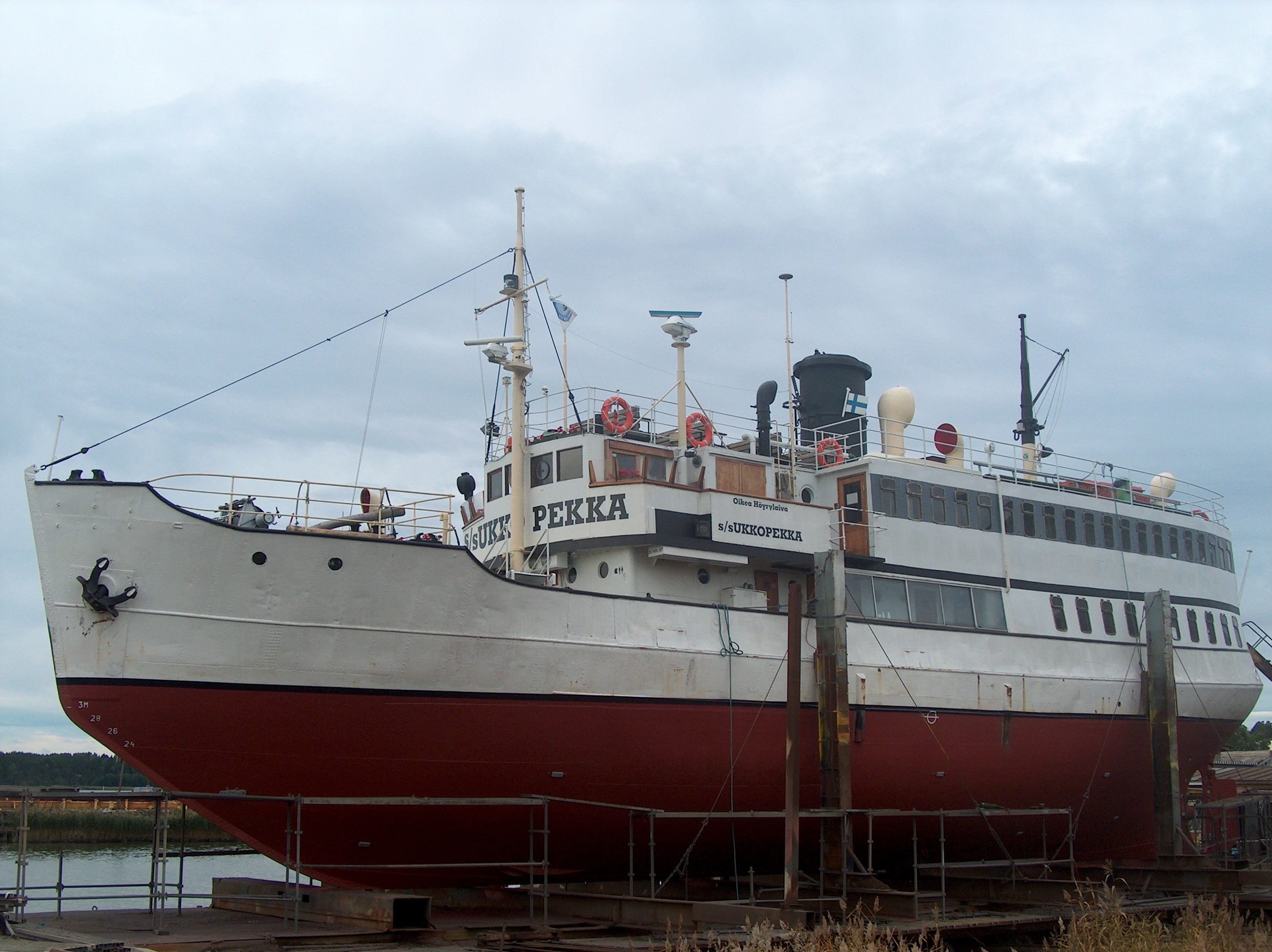
SS Ukkopekka in drydock 2005.

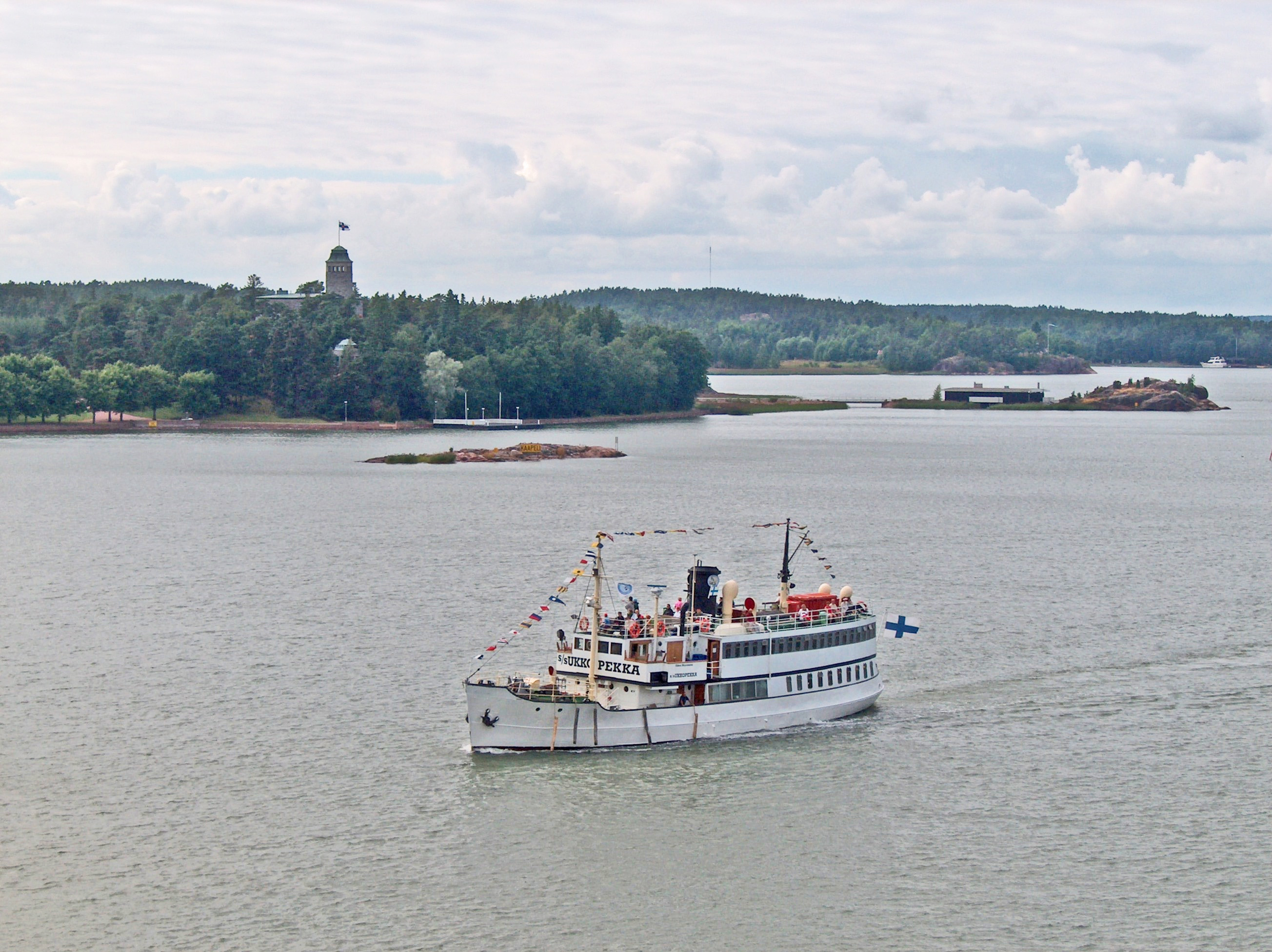
SS Ukkopekka off Kultaranta, the residence of the Finnish president.

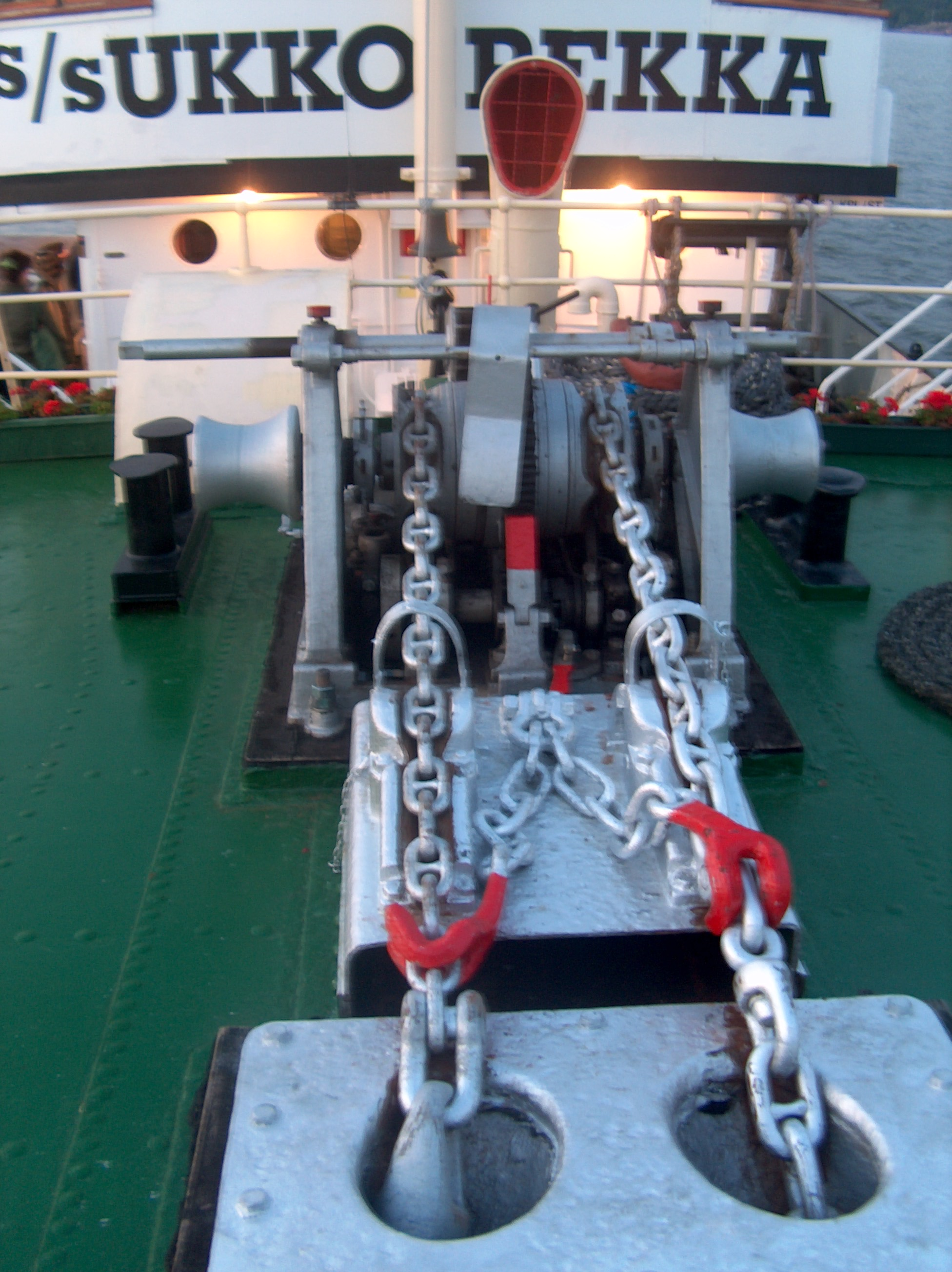
SS Ukkopekka. Old anchor machine.

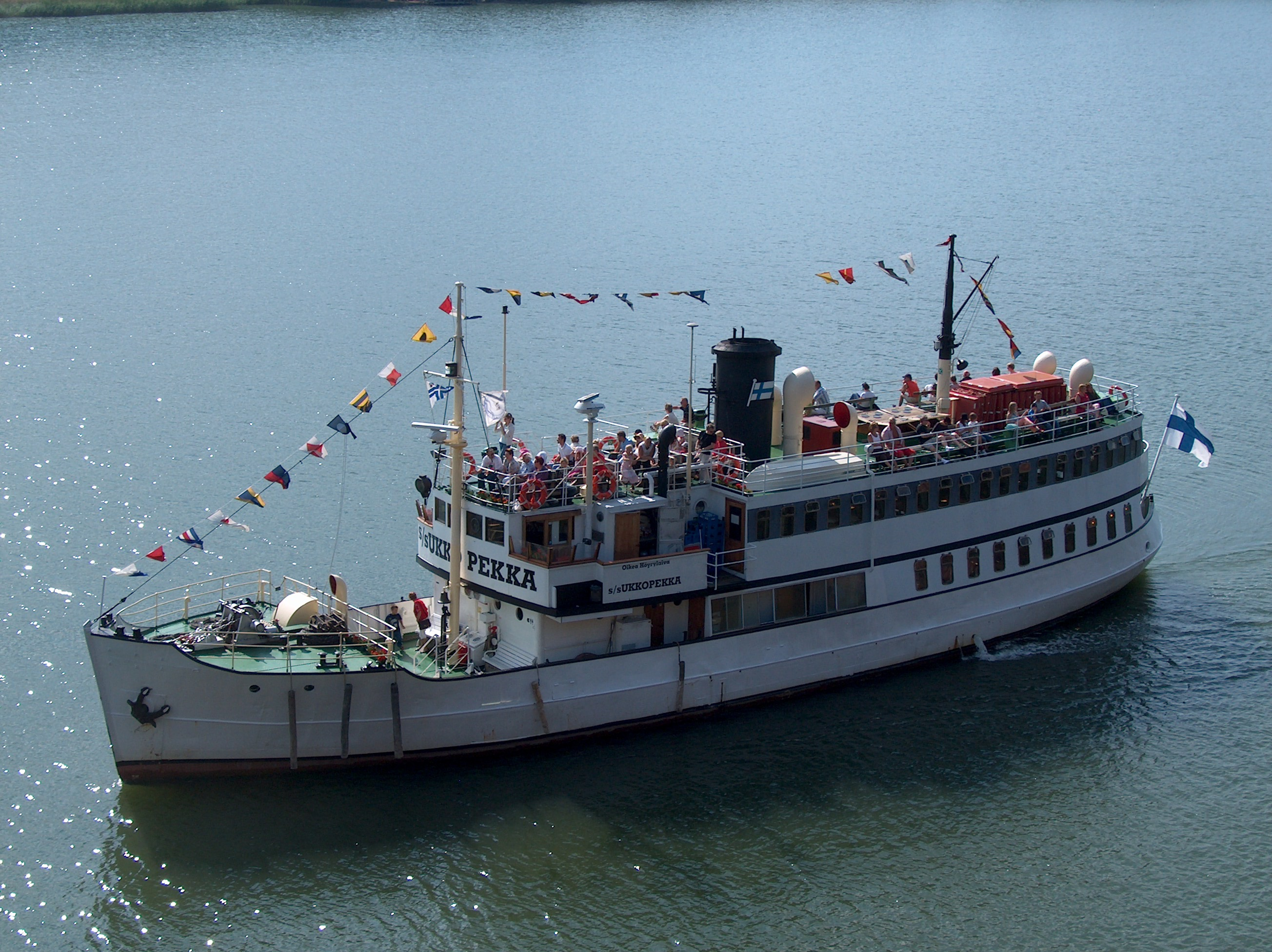
SS Ukkopekka.

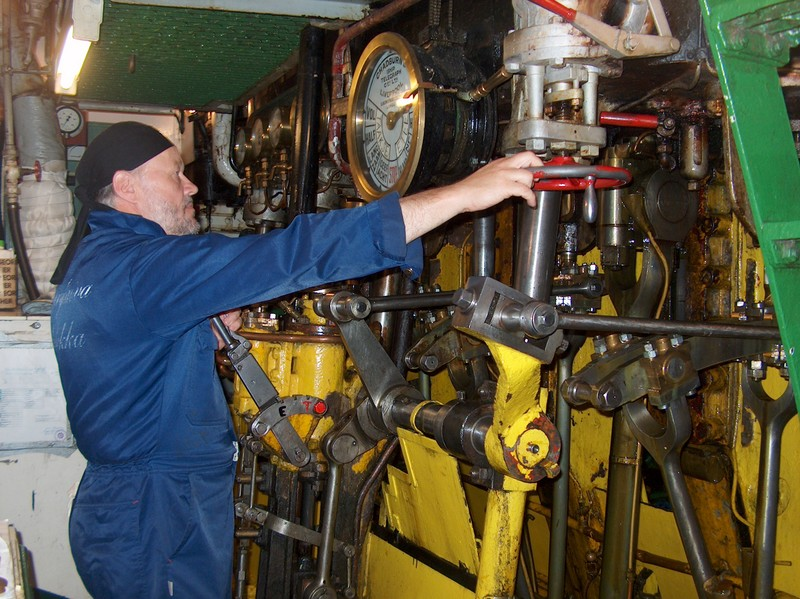
Triple-expansion steam engine on the SS Ukkopekka

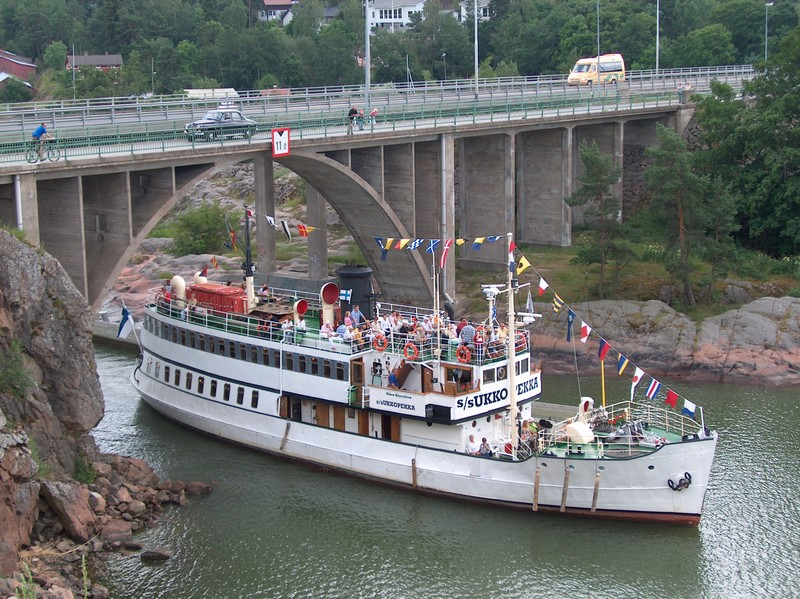
SS Ukkopekka goes under the Ukkopekka bridge.

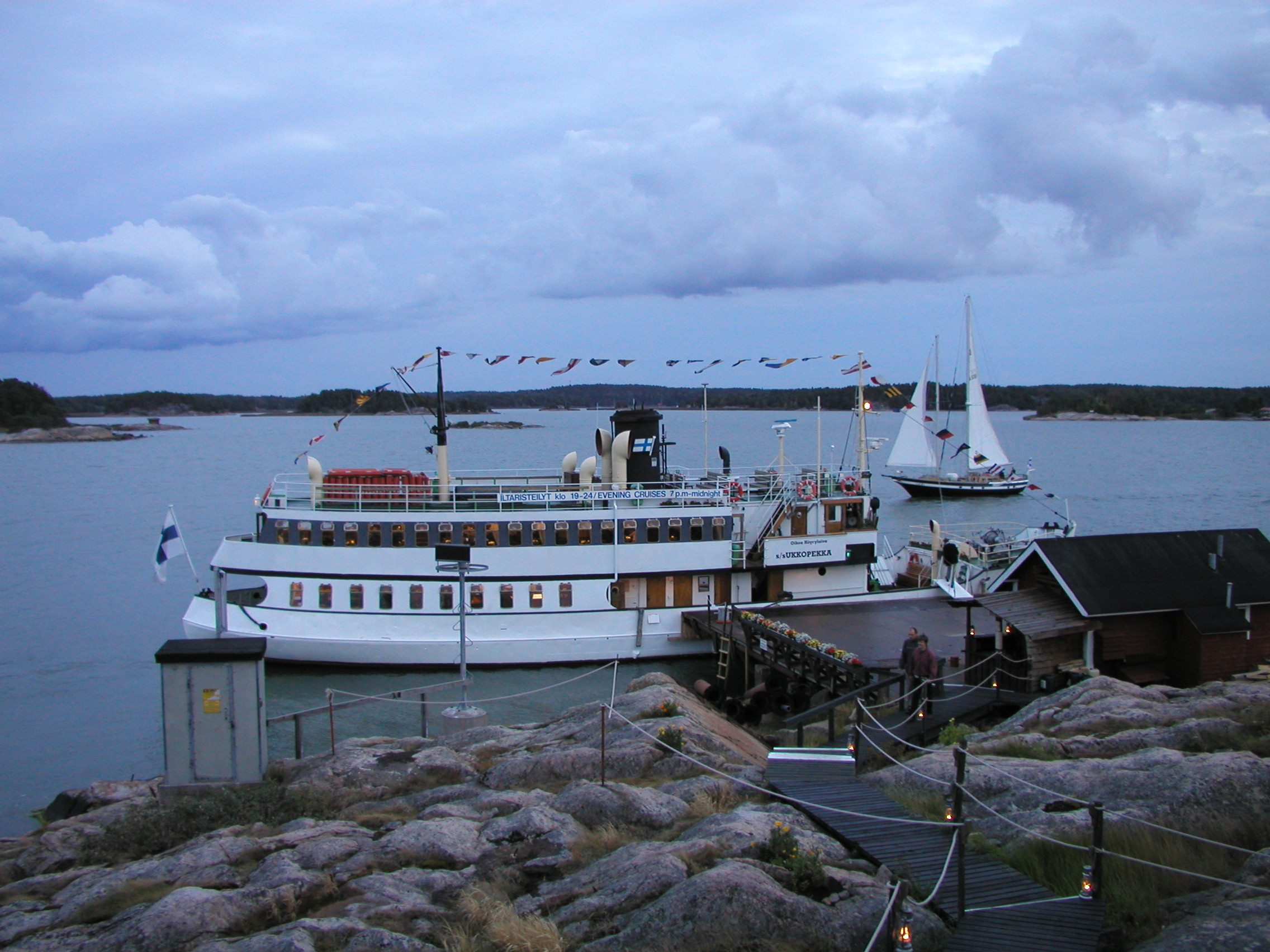
SS Ukkopekka off the island of Loistokari
