= Naantali =

City in Southwest Finland

Naantali Nådendal
- City
- Naantalin kaupunki Nådendals stad
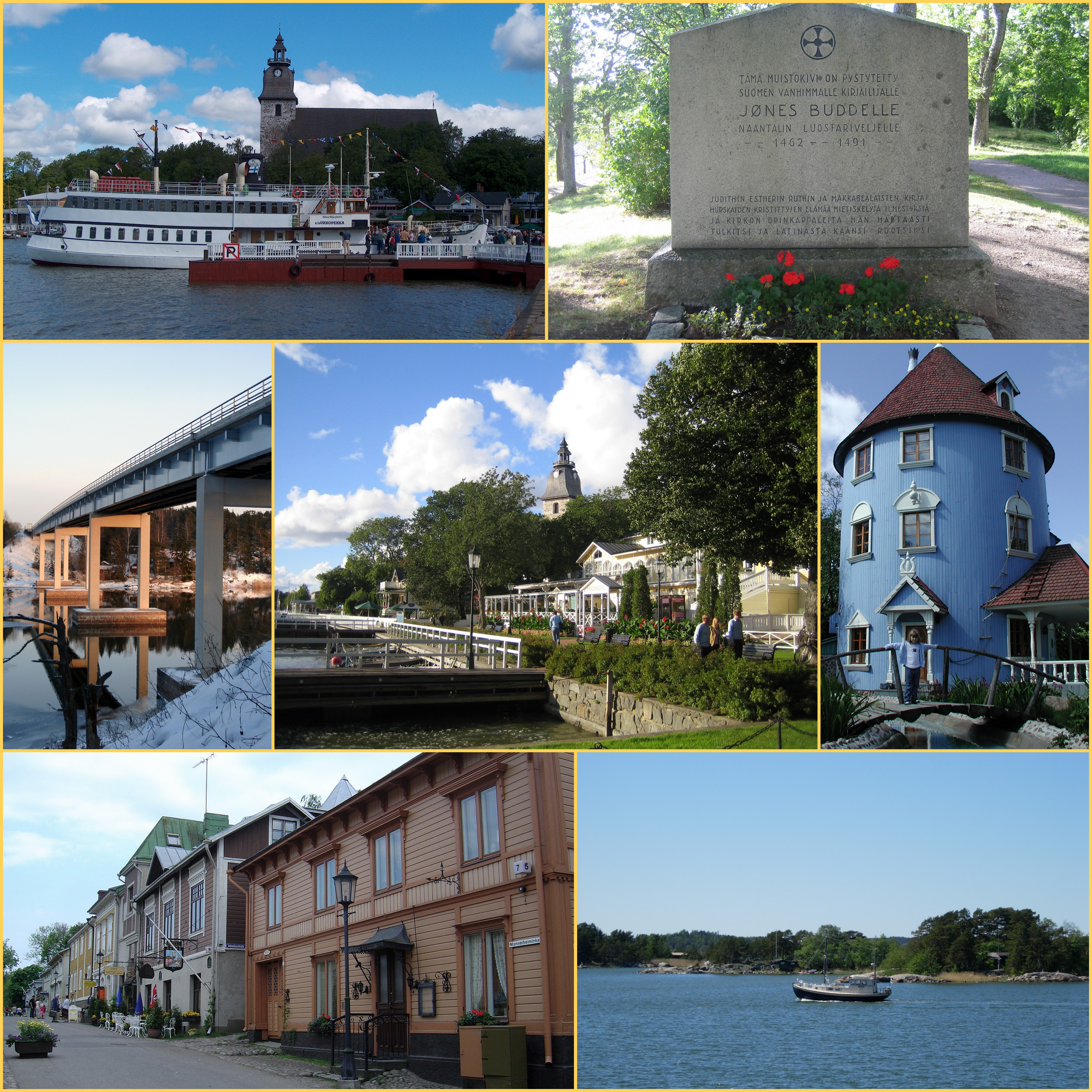
- Images, from top, left to right: Naantali’s medieval stone church and SS Ukkopekka, Jöns Budde statue, Särkänsalmi bridge, the guest harbour and Old Town of Naantali, Moomin's haus in Moomin World (Muumimaailma), Naantali Old Town and Archipelago of Naantali.

- Coat of arms
- Nickname: The Valley of Grace
- Location of Naantali in Finland
- Interactive map of Naantali
- Coordinates: 60°28′N 022°02′E
- Country: Finland
- Region: Southwest Finland
- Sub-region: Turku sub-region
- Metropolitan area: Turku metropolitan area
- Charter: 1443

Government
  - Town manager: Jouni Mutanen

Area (2018-01-01)
  - Total: 687.98 km^{2} (265.63 sq mi)
  - Land: 312.58 km^{2} (120.69 sq mi)
  - Water: 376.51 km^{2} (145.37 sq mi)
  - Rank: 231st largest in Finland

Population (2025-12-31)
  - Total: 20,390
  - Rank: 54th largest in Finland
  - Density: 65.23/km^{2} (168.9/sq mi)
- 18 800

Population by native language
  - Finnish: 94.1% (official)
  - Swedish: 1.3%
  - Others: 4.6%

Population by age
  - 0 to 14: 14.8%
  - 15 to 64: 58.8%
  - 65 or older: 26.3%
- Time zone: UTC+02:00 (EET)
  - Summer (DST): UTC+03:00 (EEST)
- Website: www.naantali.fi/en

Naantali (Finnish pronunciation: [ˈnɑːntɑli]; Swedish: Nådendal) is a town in Southwest Finland, and, as a resort town during the summer, an important centre of tourism in the country. The municipality has a population of 20,390 (31 December 2025), and is located 14 kilometres (8.7 mi) west of Turku.

The town has a land area of 312.58 square kilometres (120.69 sq mi). Most of this area is located on the islands, but the majority of the population lives on the mainland. Most of the islands are covered with forest and farmland, while the mainland consists chiefly of residential areas.

== History ==
One of the oldest towns in Finland, Naantali was founded around the medieval Brigittine convent Vallis gratiae (or Nådendal Abbey), the church of which still dominates its skyline. The charter was signed by King Christopher of Bavaria, the then ruler of Finland, in 1443. The convent got trading rights and other privileges, and the town around it began to grow. It also became an important destination for pilgrimage.

In the 16th century, as Catholicism gave way to Protestantism as the official religion of Sweden (which Finland was part of at the time), the convent was closed, and the town plunged into a depression. This lasted until the mid-18th century, when the town got a tollgate and a customs chamber. In the two centuries of economic stagnation before that the town had become famous for its knitted stockings, a craft carried on from the times of the convent.

The year 1863 saw the founding of the spa at Cape Kalevanniemi, which raised the town's status as a holiday venue. In 1922, the Kultaranta estate on Luonnonmaa was made the official summer residence for the President of the Republic, after Finland had gained its independence five years earlier.

The municipalities of Merimasku, Rymättylä and Velkua were consolidated with Naantali on 1 January 2009.

The per capita tax income of the town is the second highest of all towns in Finland, and the highest in the province of Southwest Finland.

== Name ==
The name Naantali is the fennicised version of the Swedish name of the town, Nådendal. The Swedish name was given as a direct translation from the Latin Vallis Gratiae which literally means "The Valley of Grace".

== Demographics ==
=== Population ===
The city of Naantali has 20,390 inhabitants, making it the 54th most populous municipality in Finland. The city of Naantali is part of the Turku region, which is the third largest urban area in Finland with 355,791 inhabitants.

Population size of Naantali 1990–2025
Year	Population
1990	14,622
1995	15,106
2000	16,743
2005	18,100
2010	18,807
2015	19,130
2020	19,427
2025	20,390

=== Languages ===
Population by
mother tongue (2025)
1. Finnish (94.0%)
2. Swedish (1.30%)
3. Ukrainian (1.00%)
4. Russian (0.60%)
5. Estonian (0.40%)
6. English (0.40%)
7. Arabic (0.20%)
8. Other (2.10%)

Naantali is a monolingual Finnish-speaking municipality. The majority of the population, 19,177 persons (94.1%), spoke Finnish as their first language. In addition, the number of Swedish speakers was 274 persons (1.3%) of the population. Foreign languages were spoken by 4.6% of the population. As English and Swedish are compulsory school subjects, functional bilingualism or trilingualism acquired through language studies is not uncommon.

At least 30 different languages are spoken in Naantali. The most common foreign languages are Ukrainian (1.0%), Russian (0.6%), Estonian (0.4%) and English (0.4%).

== Tourism and points of interest ==
The proximity of both Turku, the region's administrative centre and largest city, and of the archipelago both contribute to the area's popularity with tourists.

Other points of interest in the city include Moomin World, a theme park on the island of Kailo, and Naantali’s medieval convent stone church. The area also includes the official summer residence of the President of Finland, the Kultaranta estate which is located on the island of Luonnonmaa.

The Archipelago Sea boat traffic is handled by S/S Ukkopekka. Old steamship cruise Naantali-Turku-Naantali.

Naantali hosts an international music festival every June, and the traditional Sleepyhead Day carnival in July.

== Culture ==
Every 27 July, Naantali celebrates the National Sleepy Head Day (Finnish: Unikeonpäivä; Swedish: Sjusovardagen). The old tradition is to throw a chosen "sleepy head", usually a Finnish celebrity, in the sea from the city's port at 8 a.m. The identity of the sleeper is kept secret until the event. People who are chosen have usually done something to the benefit of the city.

== Other industries ==
In addition to tourism, the city's main industries are electricity production, oil refining, manufacturing, and services. The Port of Naantali is the third largest in Finland in terms of goods traffic, and the city is home to a power plant and an oil refinery owned by the government-controlled company Fortum and Neste.

== International relations ==
=== Twin towns — Sister cities ===
Naantali is twinned with:

- Vadstena, Sweden
- Nordfyn, Denmark
- Svelvik, Norway
- Vesturbyggð, Iceland
- Puck, Poland

Previously:

- Kirovsk, Russia

== Notable people ==
- Kaarlo Heinonen (1878–1944)
- Teppo Rastio (born 1934)
- Pekka Siitoin (1944–2003)
- Keijo Virtanen (born 1945)
- Ilkka Kantola (born 1957)
- Lauri Heikkilä (born 1957)
- Jukka Vilander (born 1962)
- Cristal Snow (born 1975)

== Gallery ==
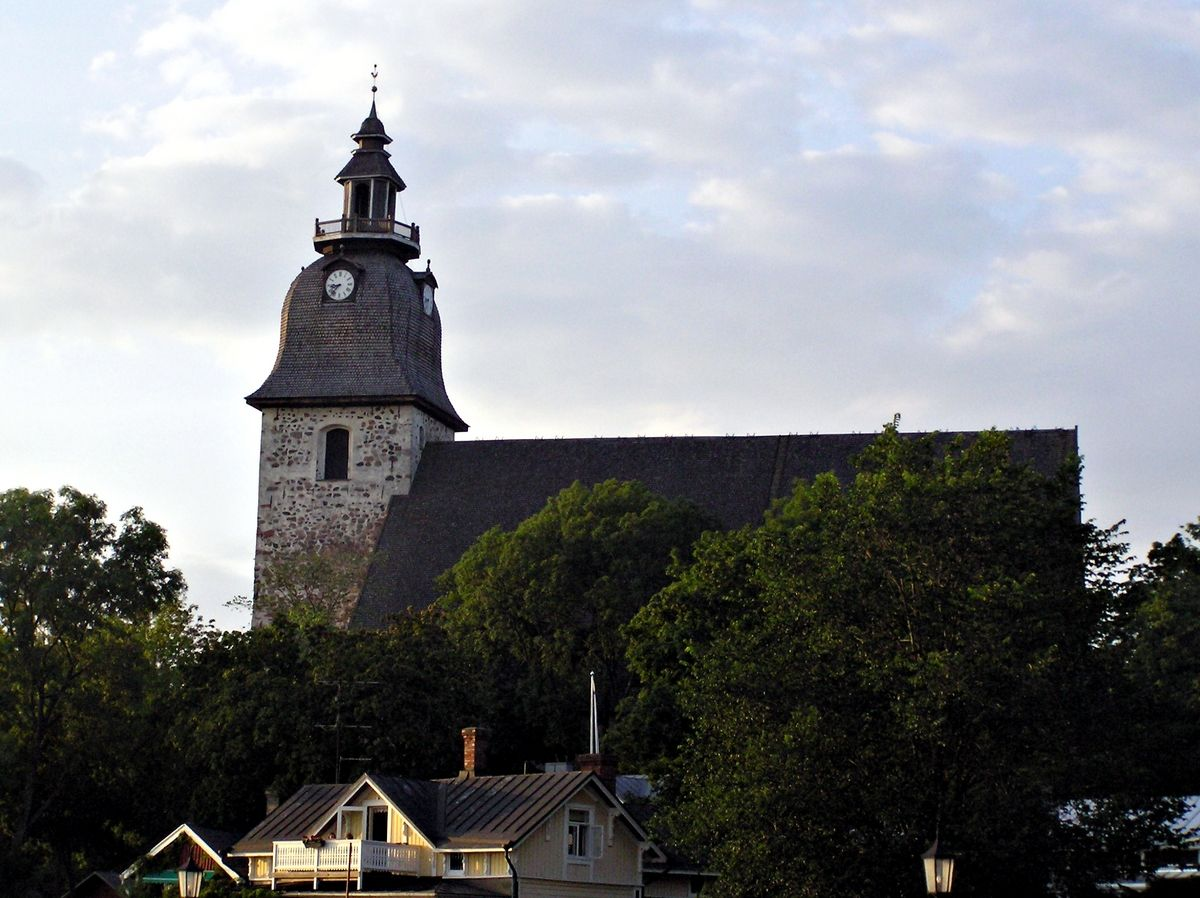
Naantali Church, one of the oldest monuments in Finland

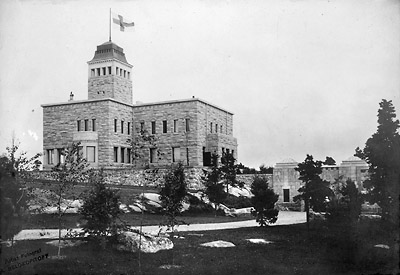
Kultaranta Castle residence of the President of Finland, in 1920

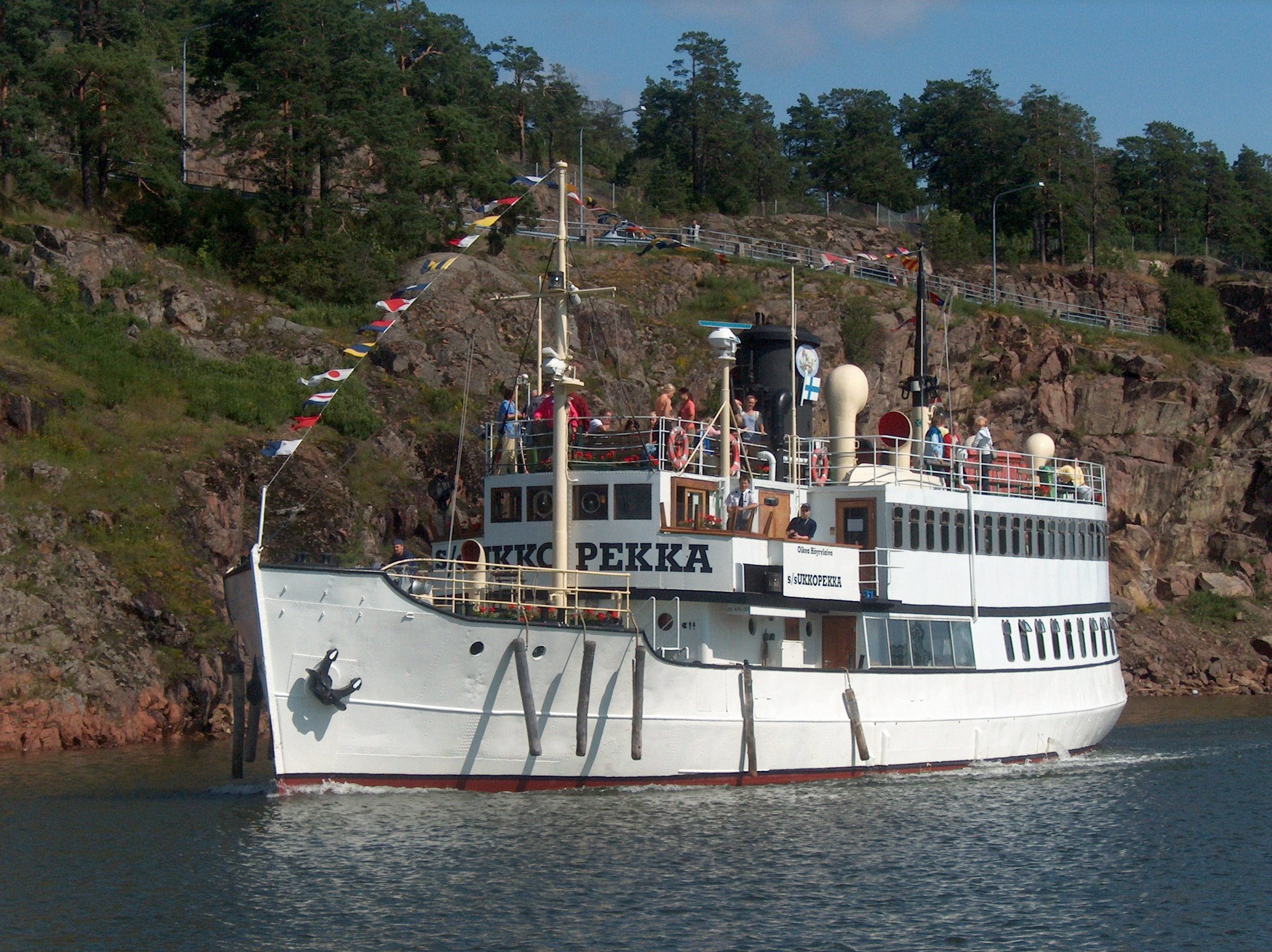
Steamship S/S Ukkopekka

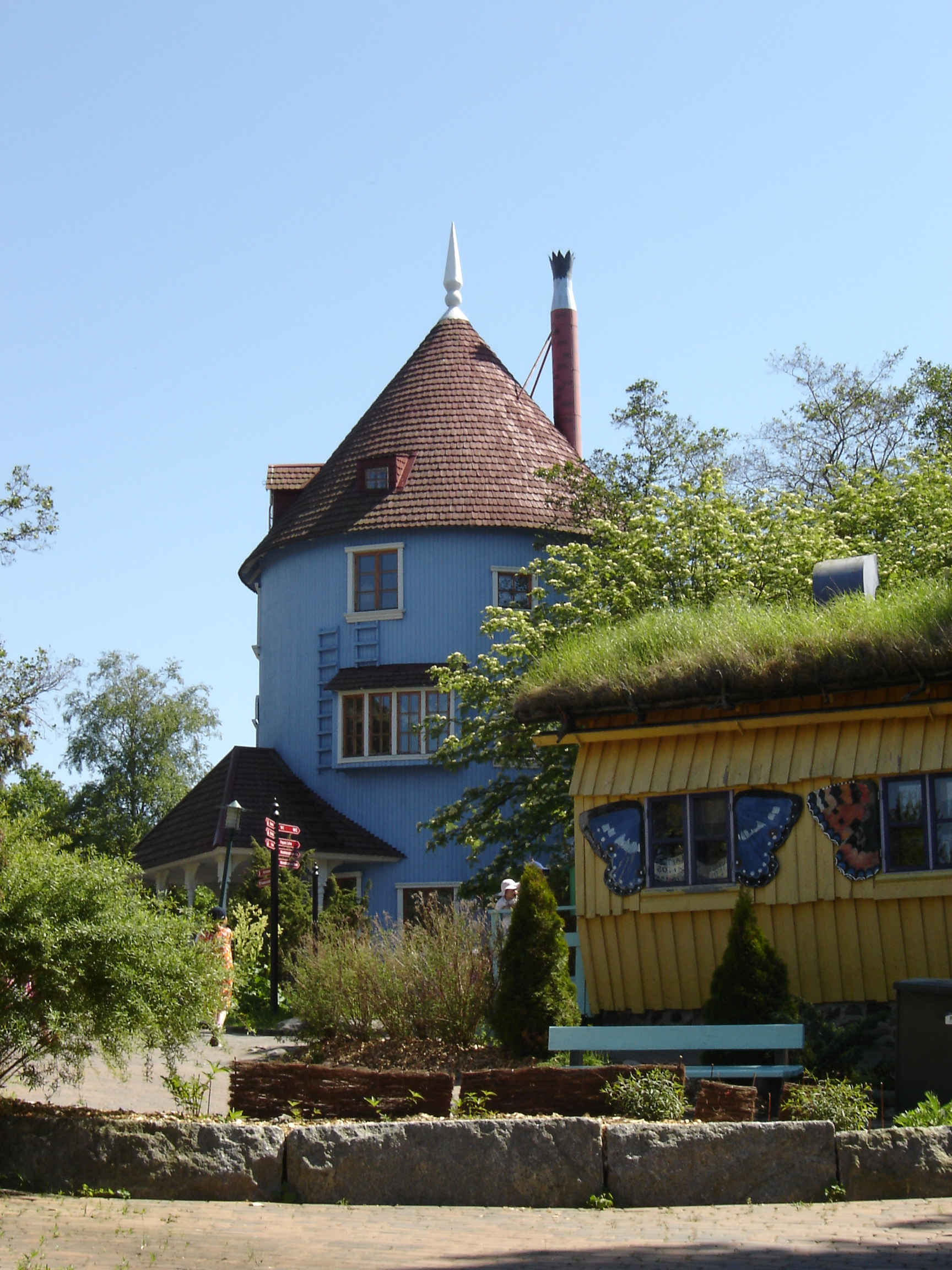
Moomin World is one of the most popular theme parks of Northern Europe.

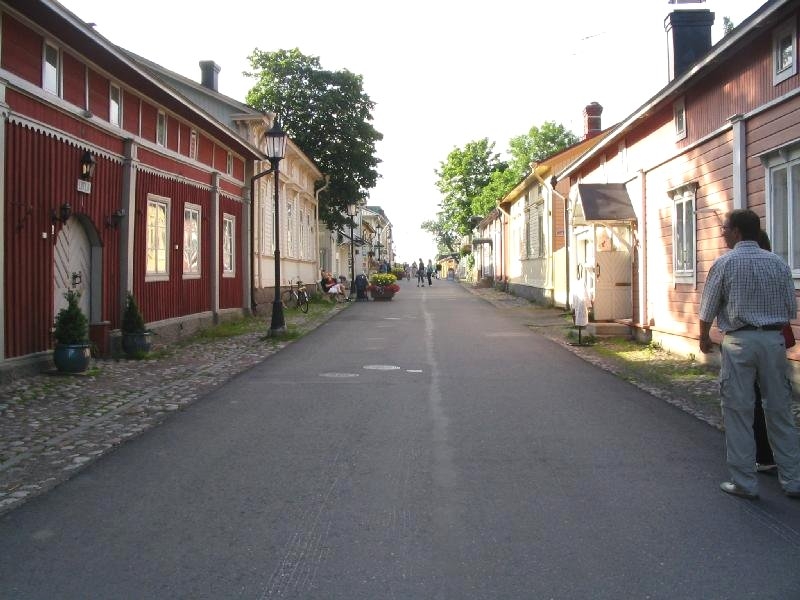
Street view in the summertime.

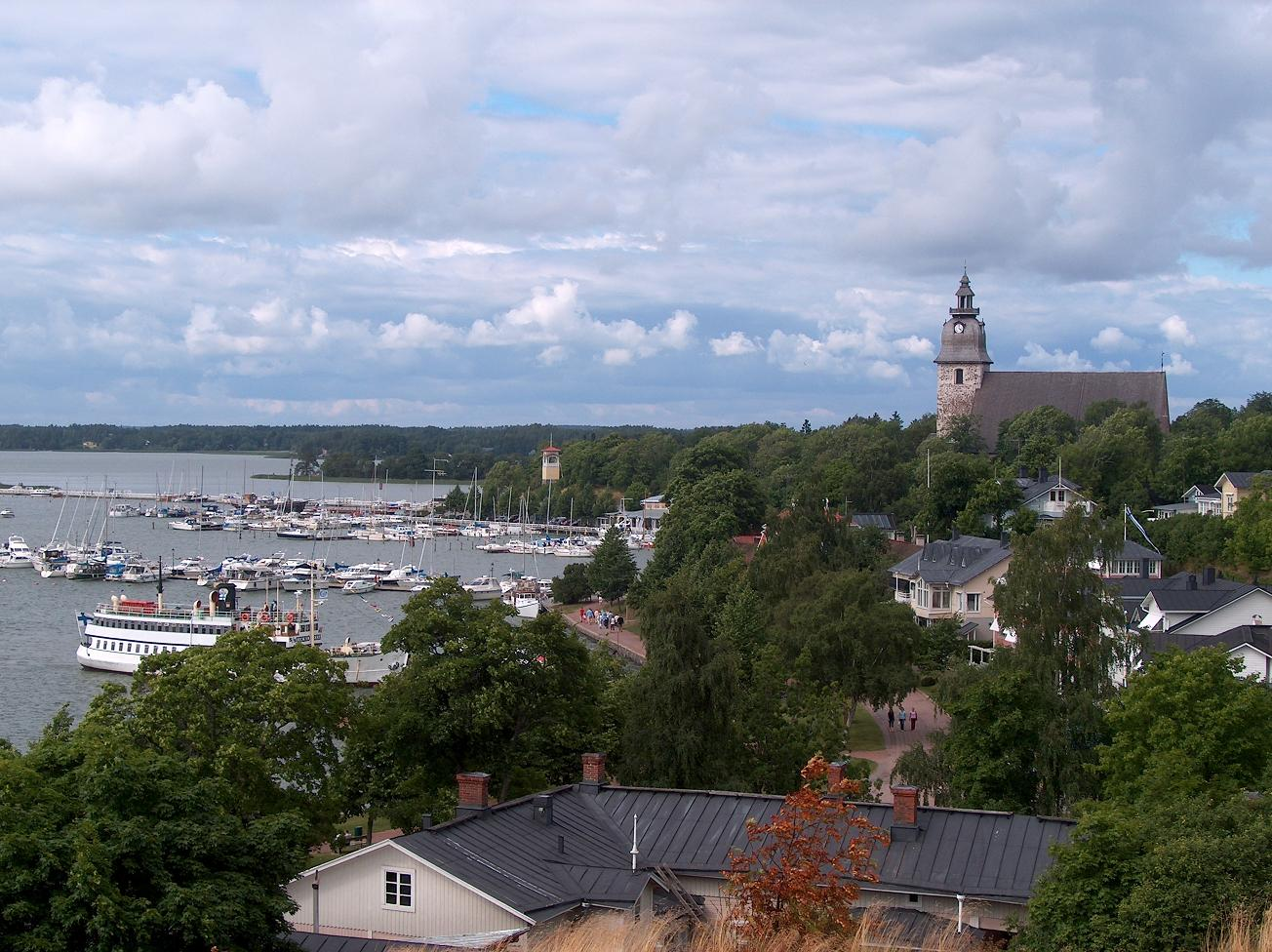
Naantali old town and harbour

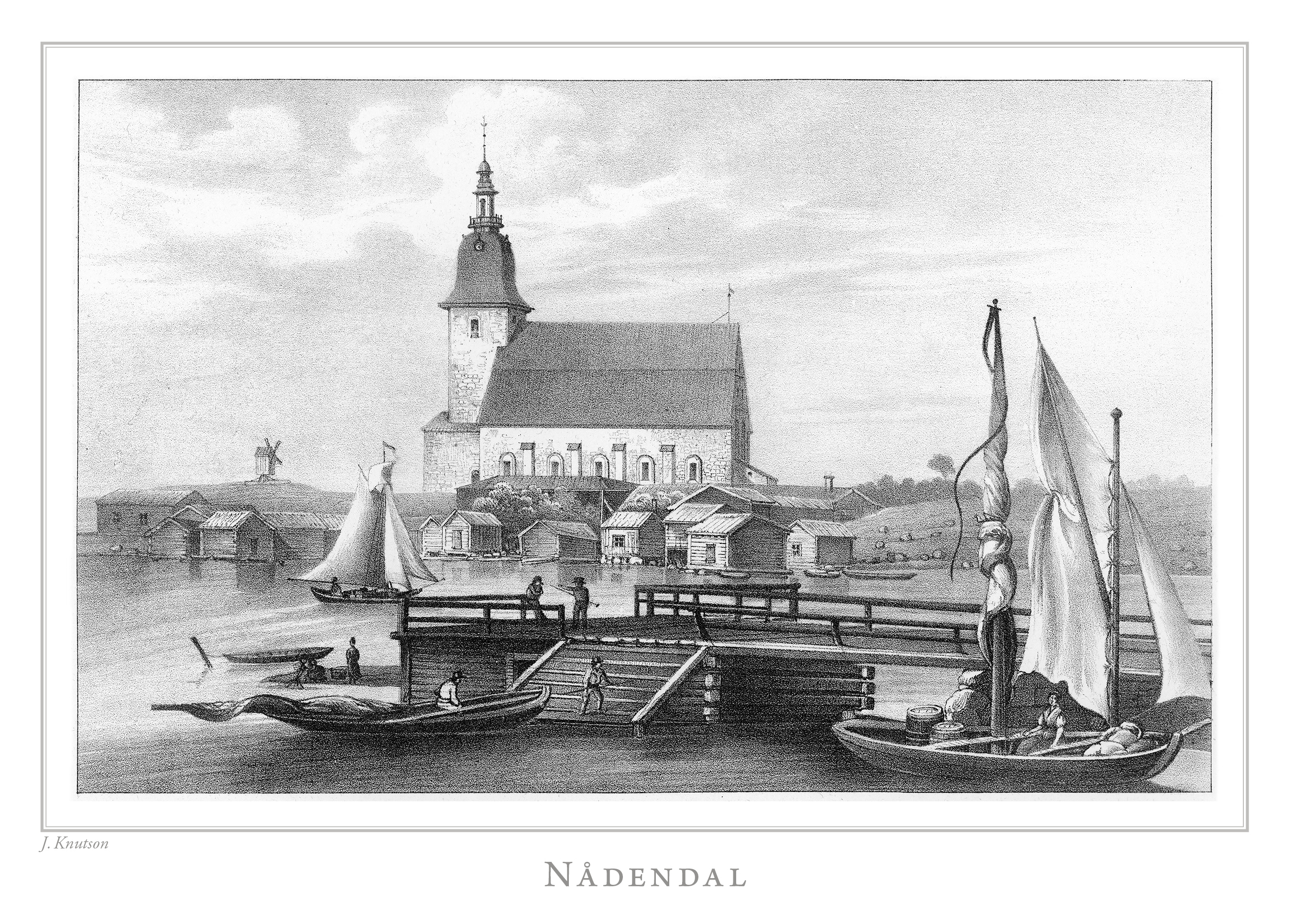
Litograph of Nådendal from mid-19th century, published in Finland framstäldt i teckningar by Zacharias Topelius.

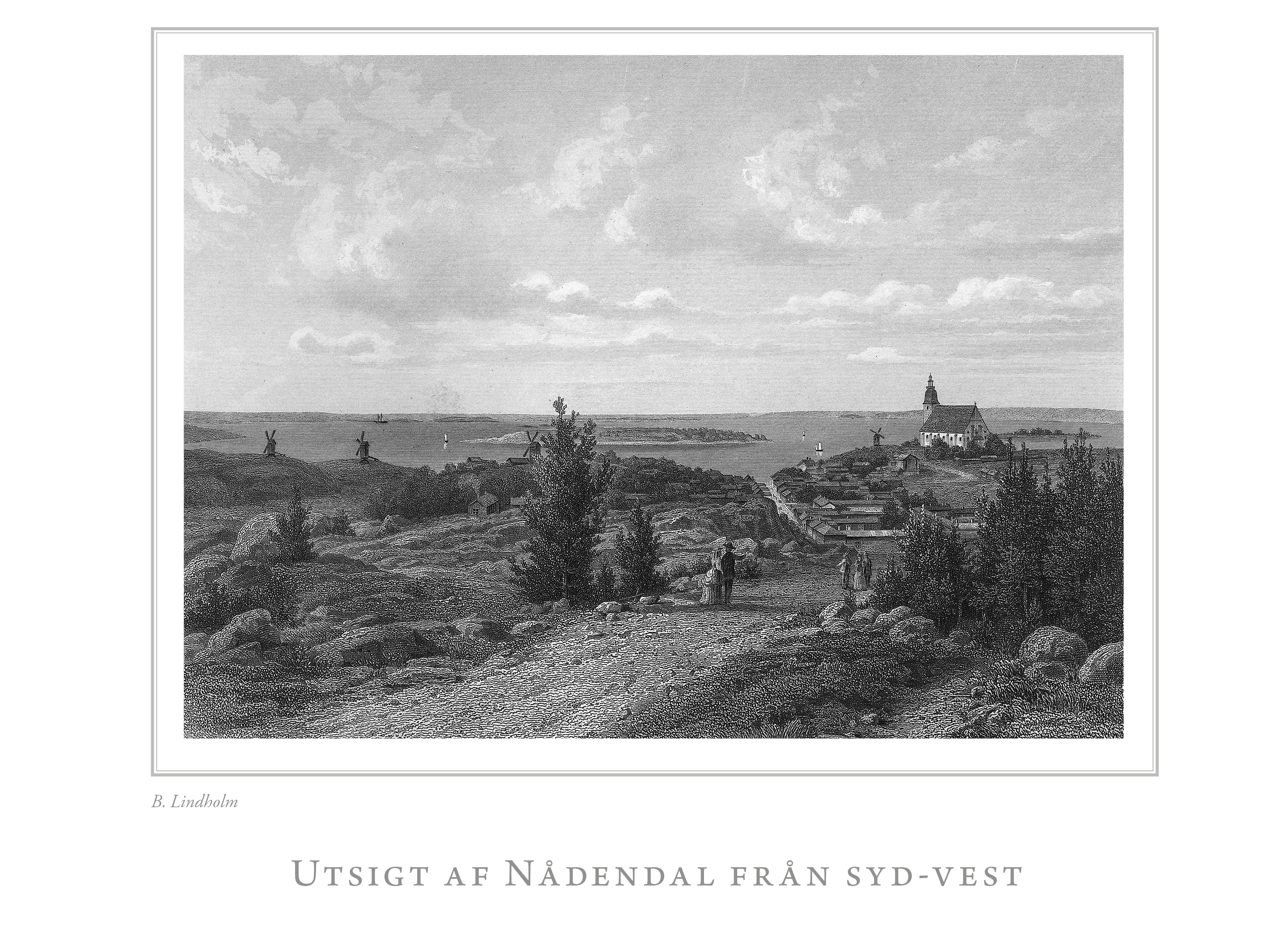
Steel engraving of Nådendal from mid-19th century, published in En resa i Finland by Zacharias Topelius

== See also ==
- Ekenäs, Finland
