= Keijo Virtanen =

Finnish historian

Keijo Aarre Virtanen
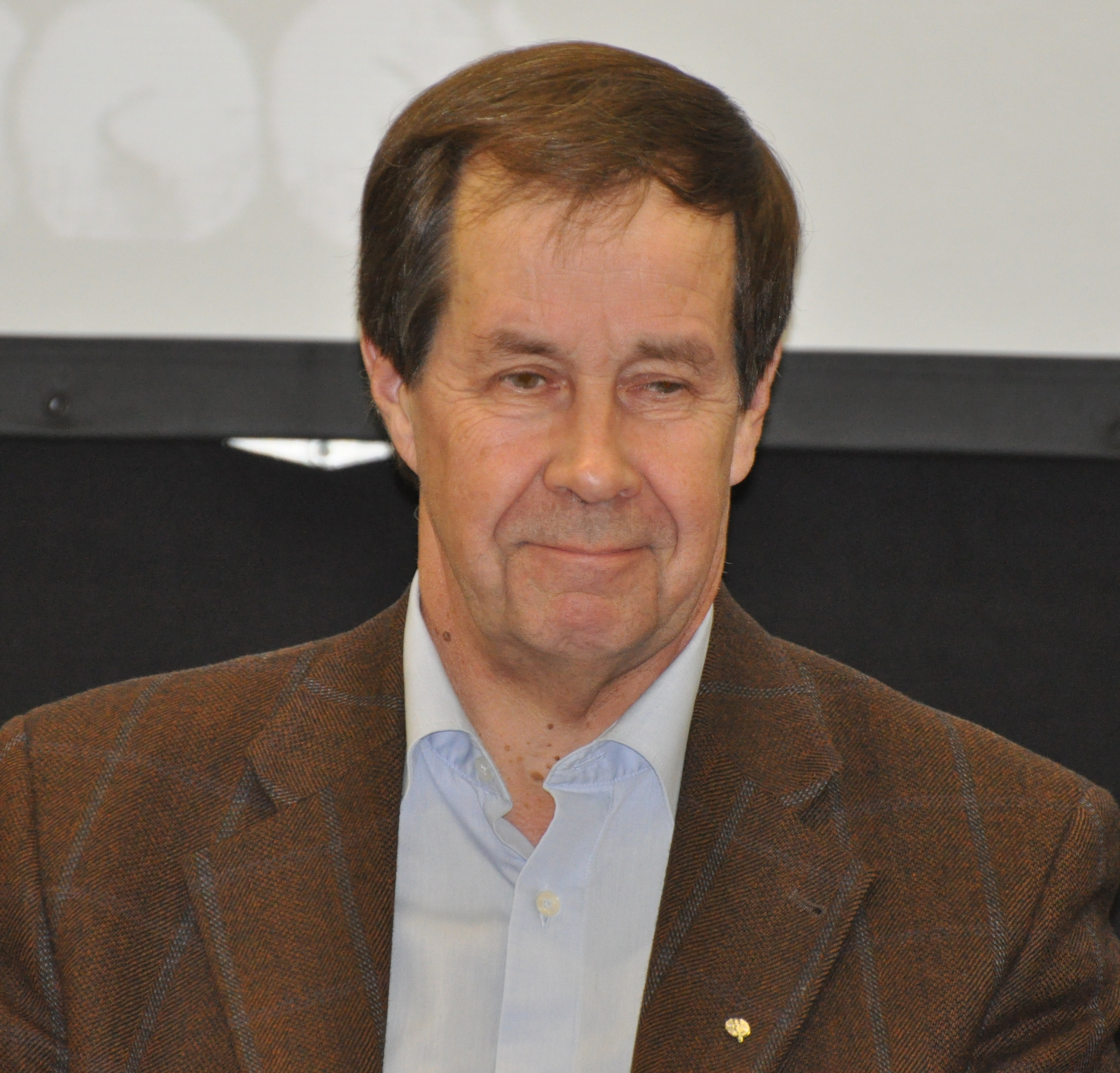
- Keijo Virtanen in 2010
- Born: August 28, 1945 (age 80); Naantali, Finland
- Occupation: Historian

Keijo Aarre Virtanen (born 28 August 1945 in Naantali) is a Finnish historian, PhD 1980. In 1970 Virtanen was affiliated with the University of Turku, where he became professor 1990 in cultural history. He served as the Rector of the University of Turku in 1997–2012.

Virtanen has focused on the spread of American culture and the cultural exchange between the European and American cultures, which has resulted in a doctoral dissertation Settlement or return (1979), where the return of Finnish emigrants from America is studied. He has published widely on migration history and ethnicity, U.S. and Canadian history and society, European integration processes, methodology of history, and university and science policies.

== Awards ==
- 2001 Honorary degree of Doctor from Klaipėda University (Lithuania).
- 2003 Honorary degree of Doctor from Tartu University (Estonia).
- 2016 Honorary degree of Doctor from Lakehead University (Thunder Bay, Canada).
- Decorations: Knight Commander's Cross of the Order of the White Rose of Finland, Knight Commander's Cross of the Order of the Lion of Finland, as well as decorations from Estonia, Italy and Russia

== Education, career and scholarly work ==
- Degrees: M.A. 1972 and Ph.D. 1980 (University of Turku).
- Research associate, assistant, senior lecturer, acting associate professor and acting professor at the University of Turku (1969–1989), full professor of cultural history at the University of Turku (1990–2012).
- Researcher, Academy of Finland 1976, 1978–1982.
- Research assistant 1974-1975 and Fulbright Senior Scholar 1988–1989 (The University of Michigan).
- Rector of the University of Turku 1997–2012, Vice-Rector of the same university 1993-1997
- Several long-term research periods esp. in the United States and Canada
- Honorary Consul of Estonia in Turku and Southwest Finland 2001–2020
