= Kultaranta =

Governmental building in Naantali, Finland

- Gullranda (in Swedish)
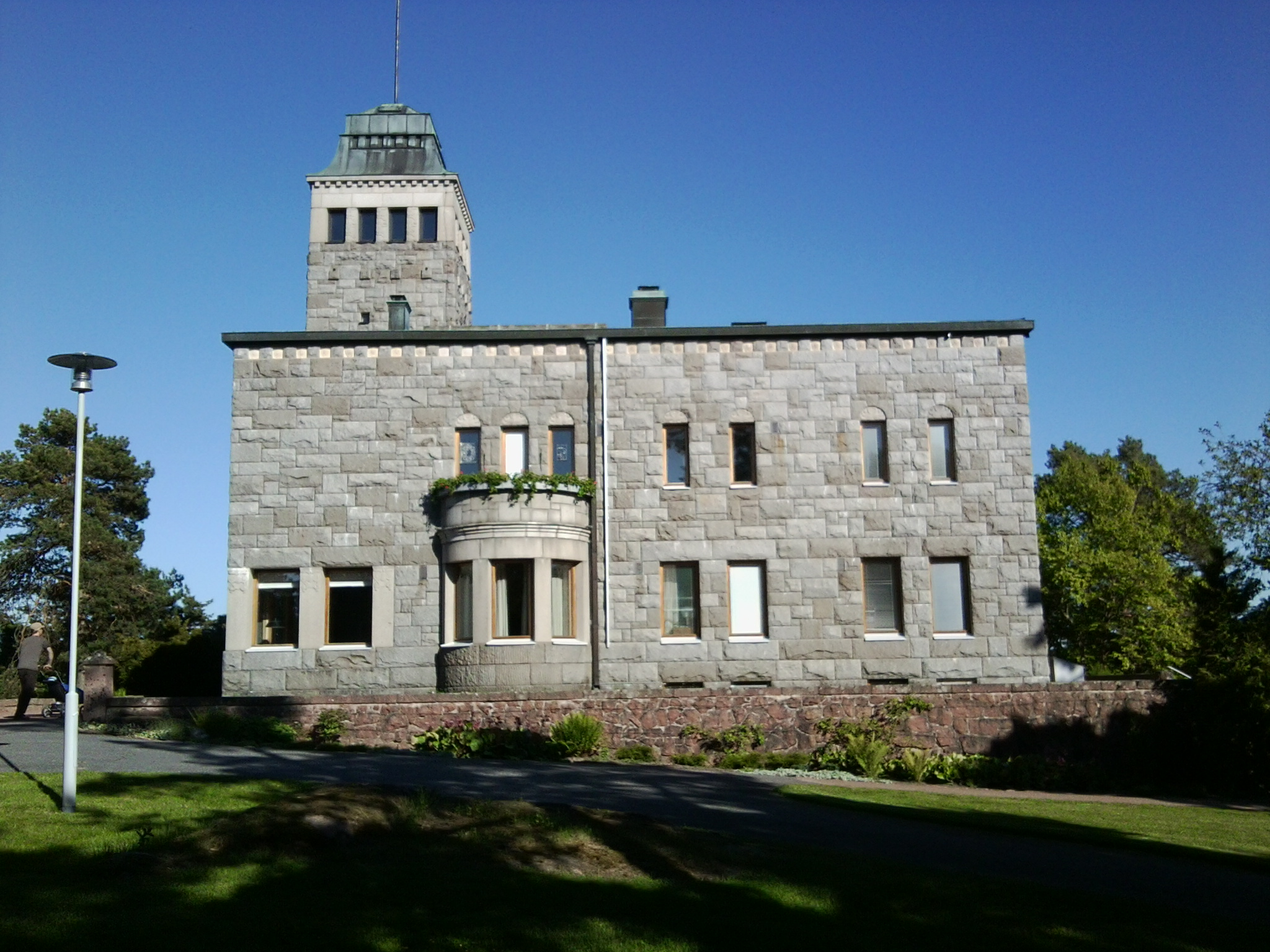
- Interactive map of the Kultaranta area

General information
- Type: Governmental
- Location: Naantali, Finland
- Coordinates: 60°28′04″N 21°59′57″E

Design and construction
- Architect: Lars Sonck
- Main contractor: Alfred Kordelin

Kultaranta (Swedish: Gullranda; lit. 'Golden Shore') is the summer residence of the president of Finland. It is in the district of Kultaranta on the island of Luonnonmaa, in the municipality of Naantali in Southwest Finland. The granite manor house is surrounded by 56 hectares (140 acres) of park belonging to the property. The complex also includes numerous outbuildings and greenhouses, and a park.

The ground floor contains the reception rooms and private apartments. Upstairs are the bedrooms and guestrooms. Marble steps lead from the ground floor to the tower, from which there are views of Naantali and the inshore islands.

The parks around the manor, containing approximately a thousand square metres of greenhouse and a garden with 3,500 roses called Medaljonki ('medallion'), are open to the public. The scent and colour of these roses are at their peak in the middle of the summer, when the President and family and their guests come to Naantali for the holidays. Tours in the garden are organised by the City of Naantali's tourist service.

Kultaranta's Park has been described as a "mini-Versailles". The parkland to the north of Kultaranta is in practically a natural state, though a few sandy pathways have been built there, and the woodland is kept in good condition.

Kultaranta has about 1,000 square metres (10,764 sq ft) of greenhouses. The garden supplies the President's household with both flowers and vegetables all year round.

Kultaranta's original owner was the businessman Alfred Kordelin, who had a manor house built for himself in 1914. It was designed by the architect Lars Sonck. When Kordelin died in 1917 the manor's ownership shifted to the University of Turku and, in 1922, the Finnish Parliament voted to acquire it for use as the president's summer residence.

== Gallery ==
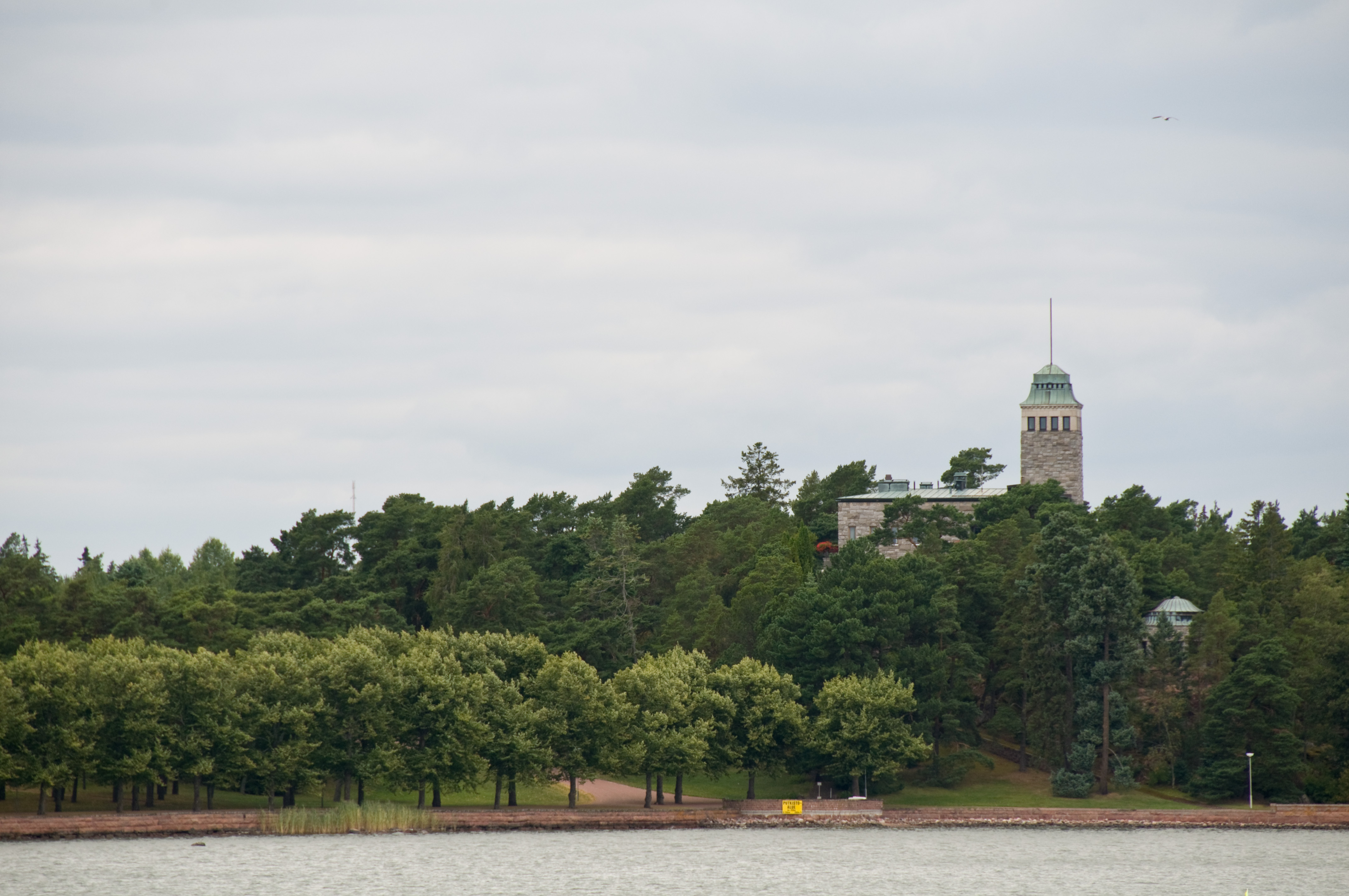
Kultaranta seen from the sea

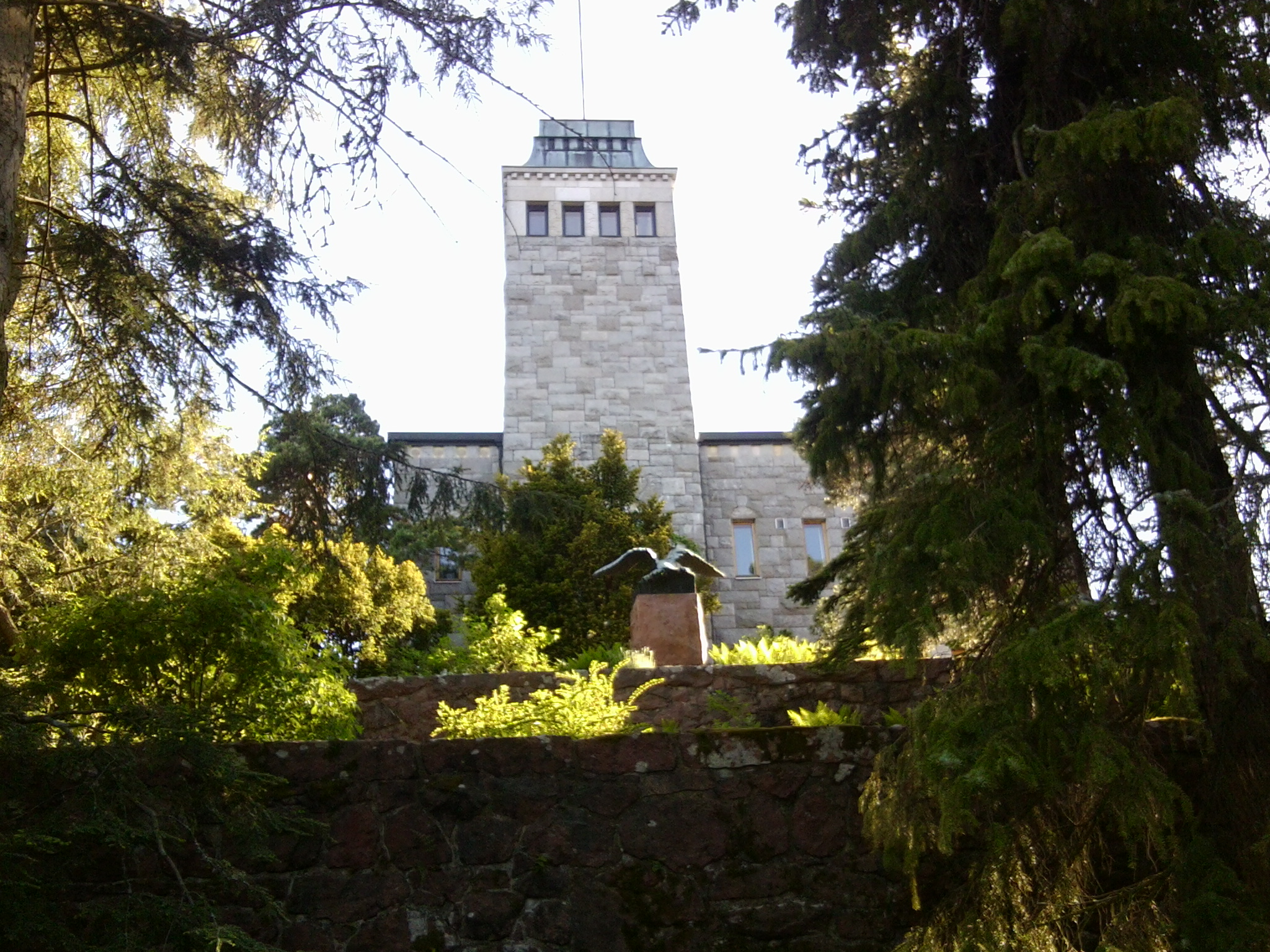
Tower detail (main building)

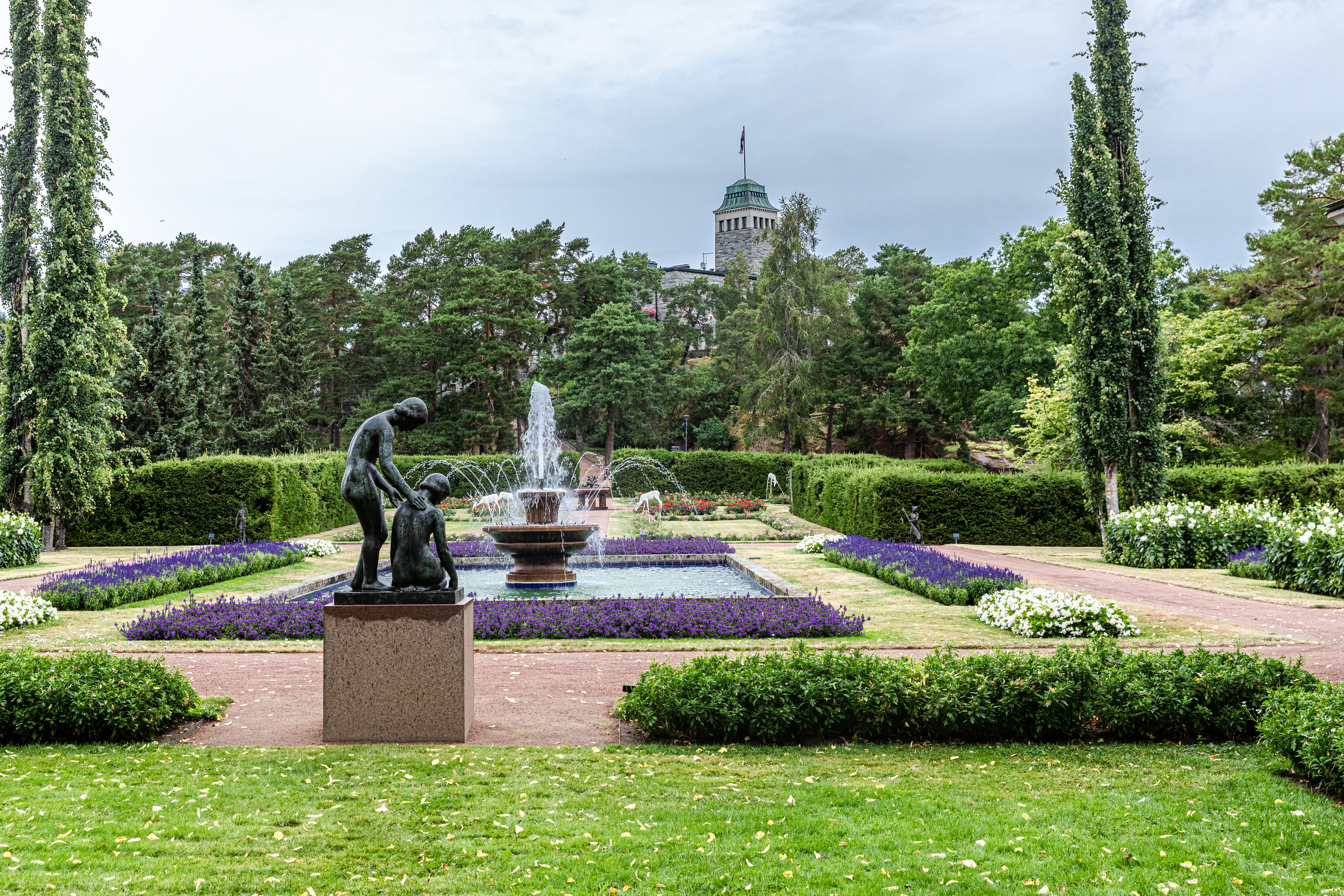
Kultaranta gardens

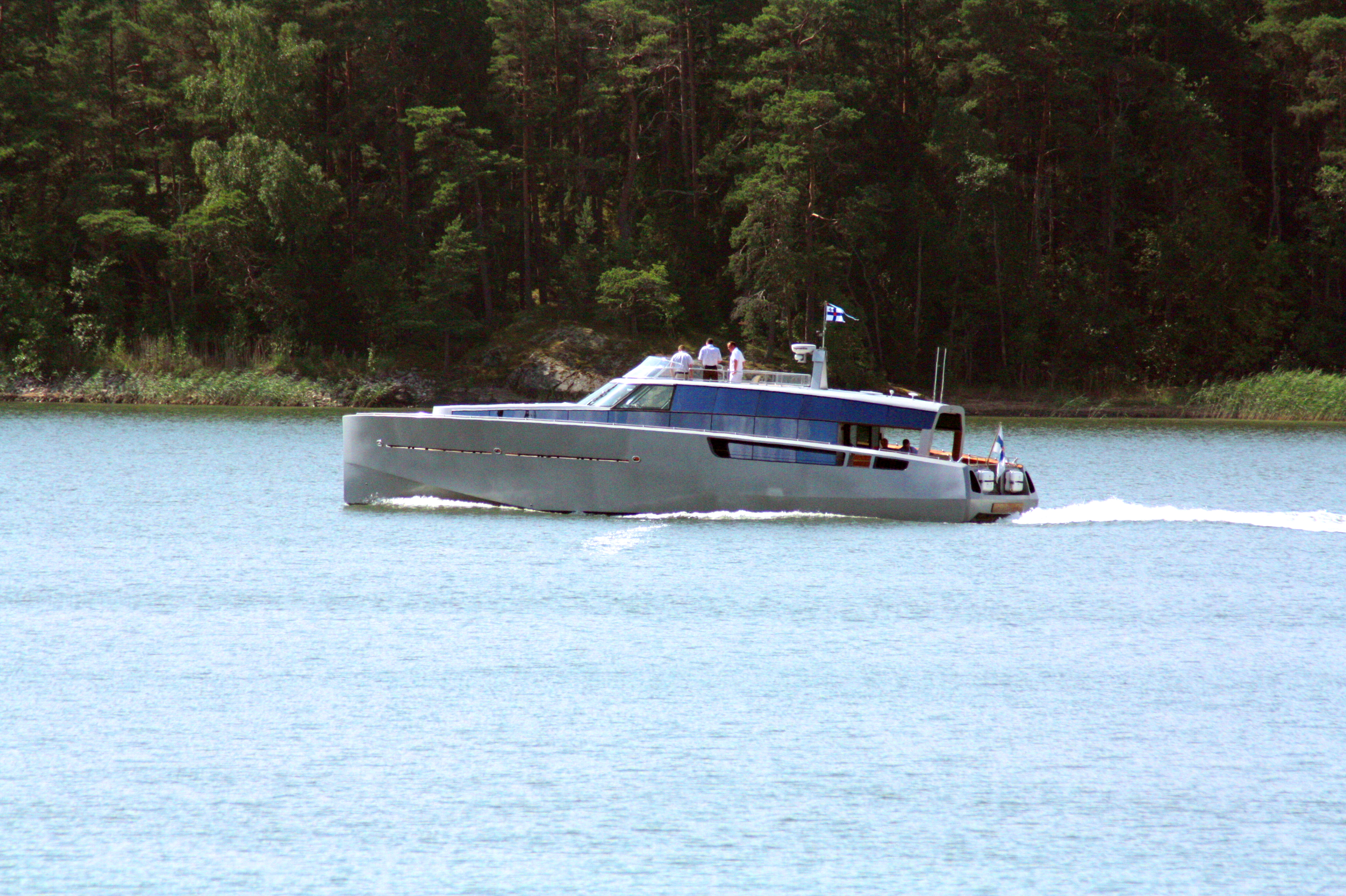
Presidential boat, Kultaranta VIII

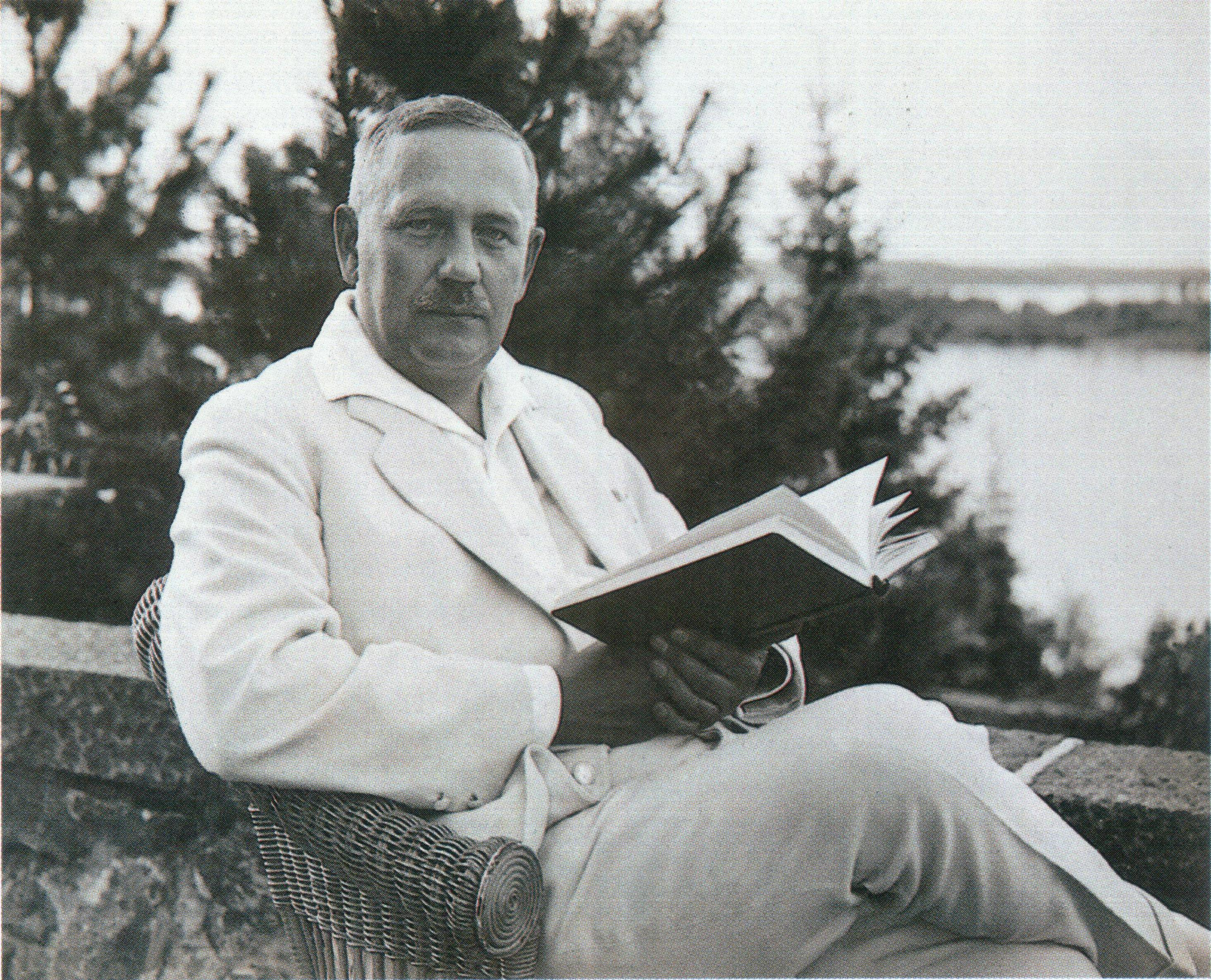
President L. K. Relander relaxing in Kultaranta in the 1920s

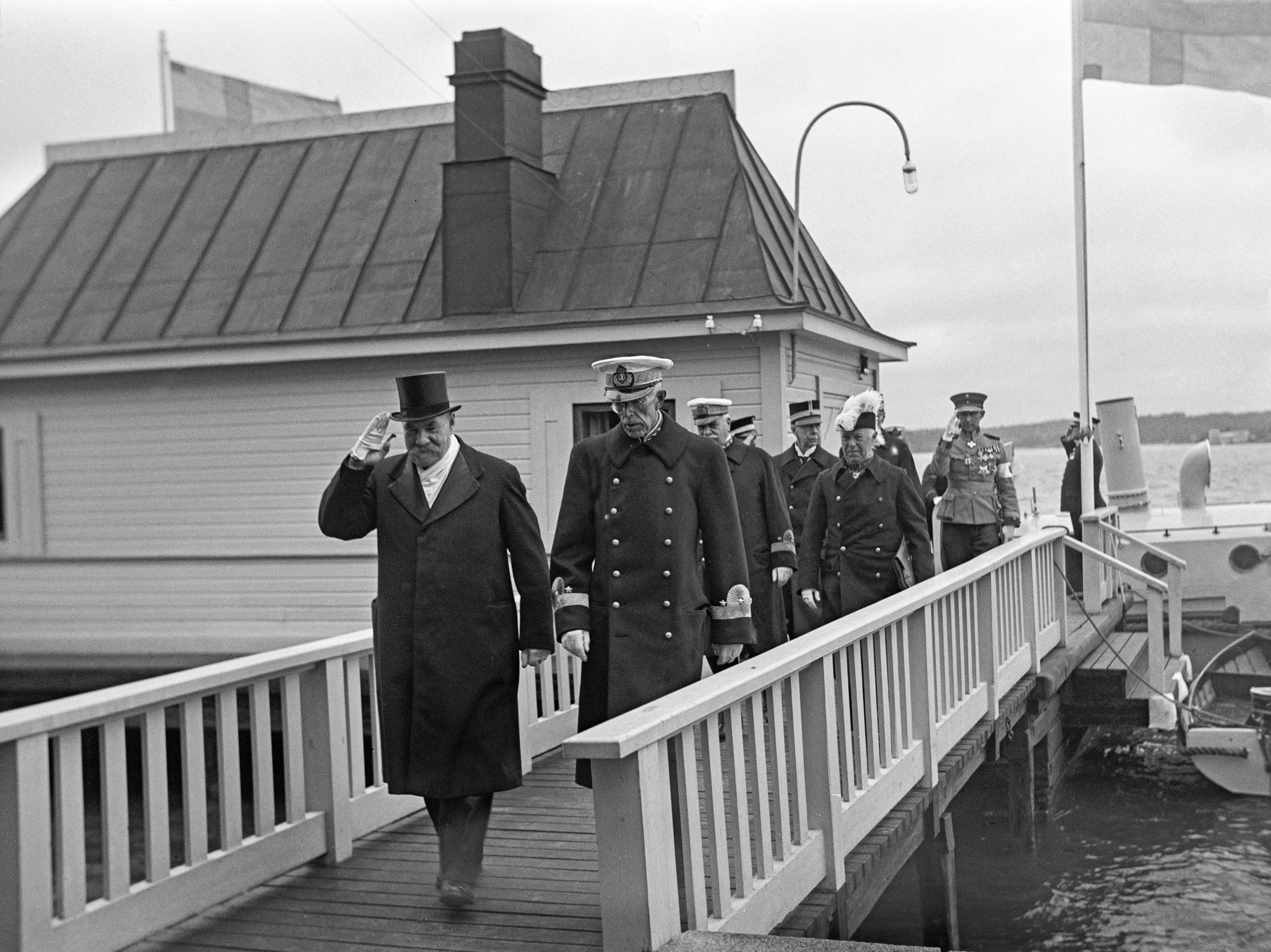
King Gustaf V arrives in Kultaranta in 1936.

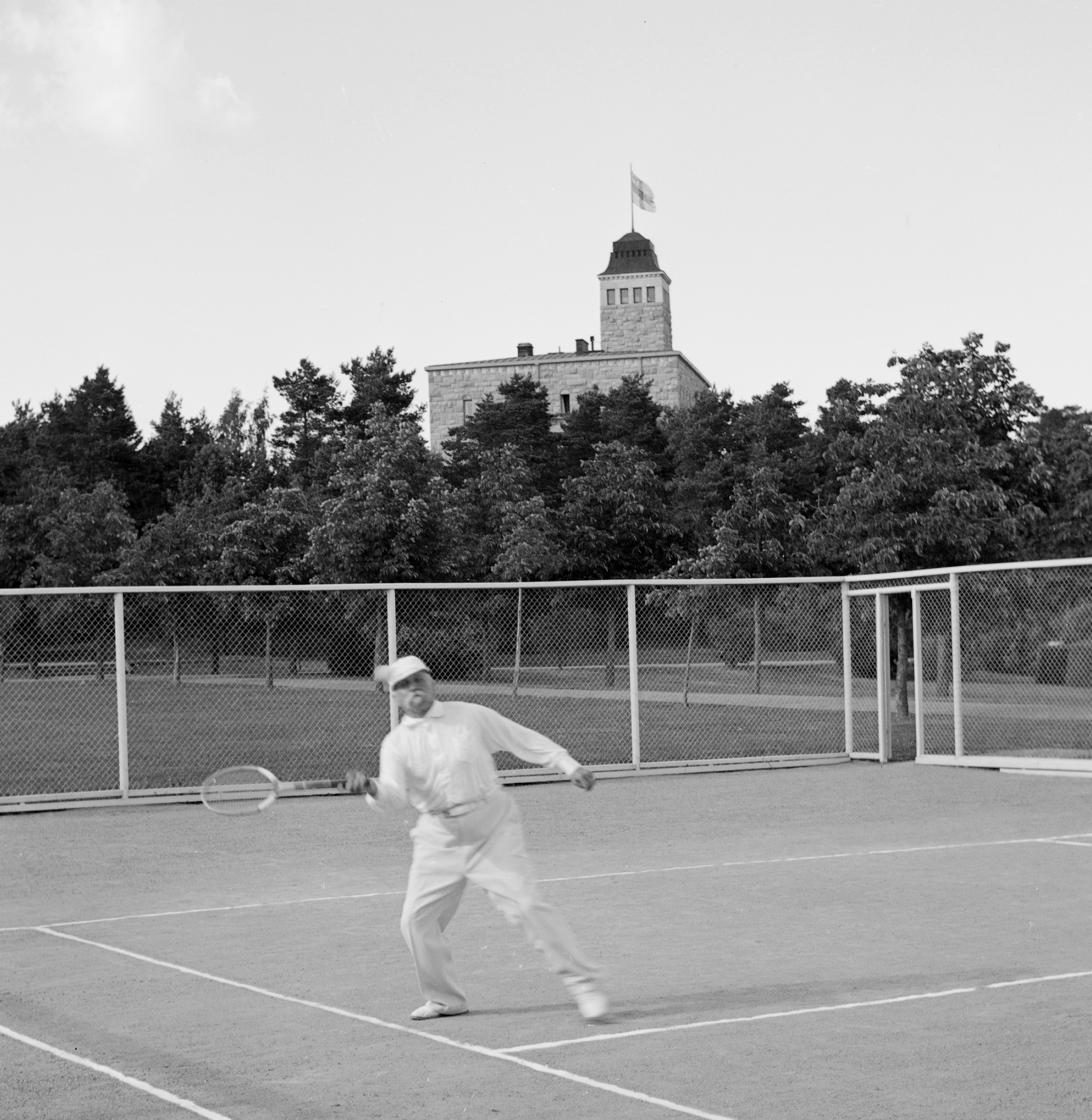
President Kyösti Kallio playing tennis in Kultaranta in 1937

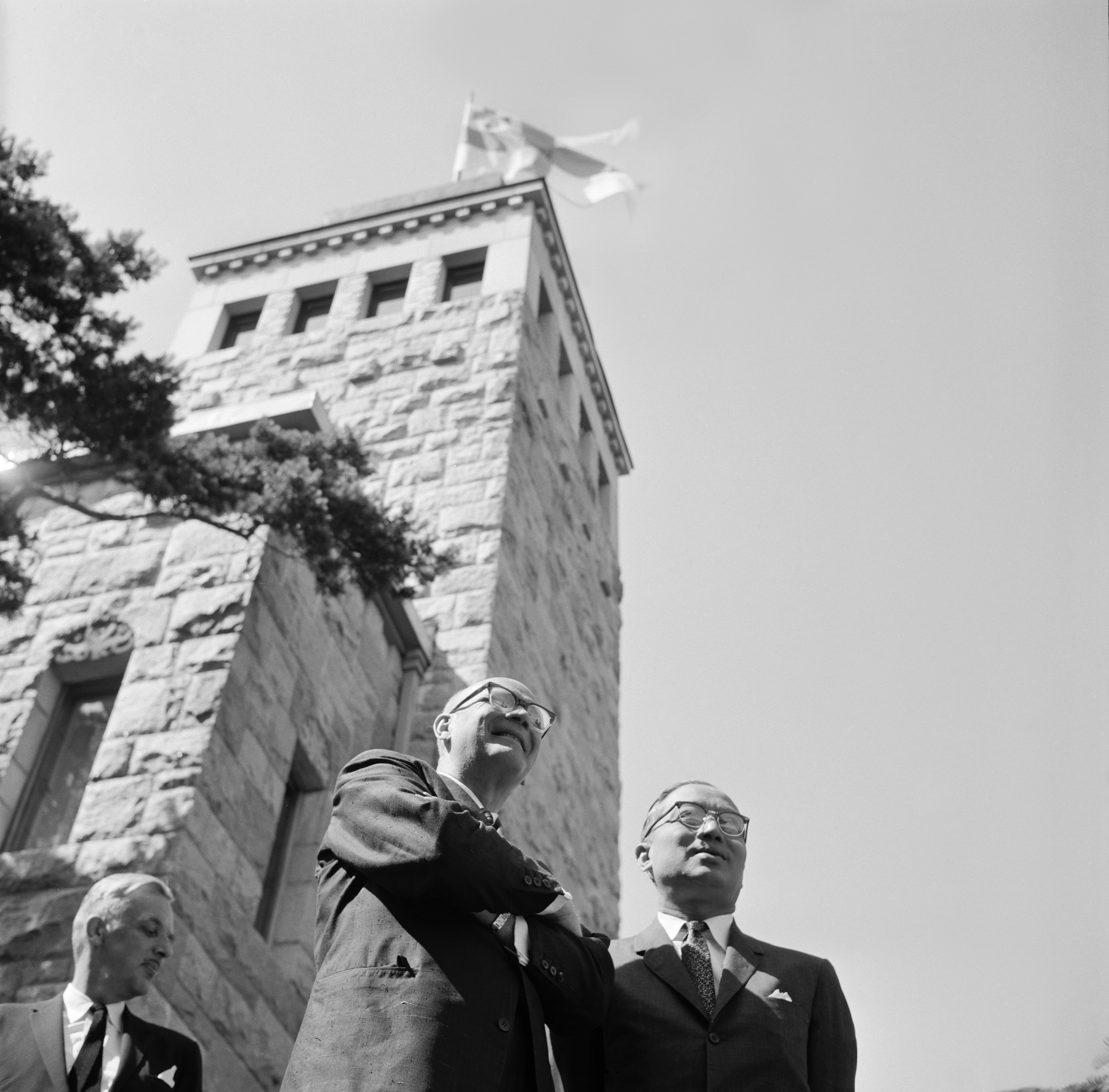
President Urho Kekkonen with Secretary-General of the United Nations U Thant in Kultaranta 1962

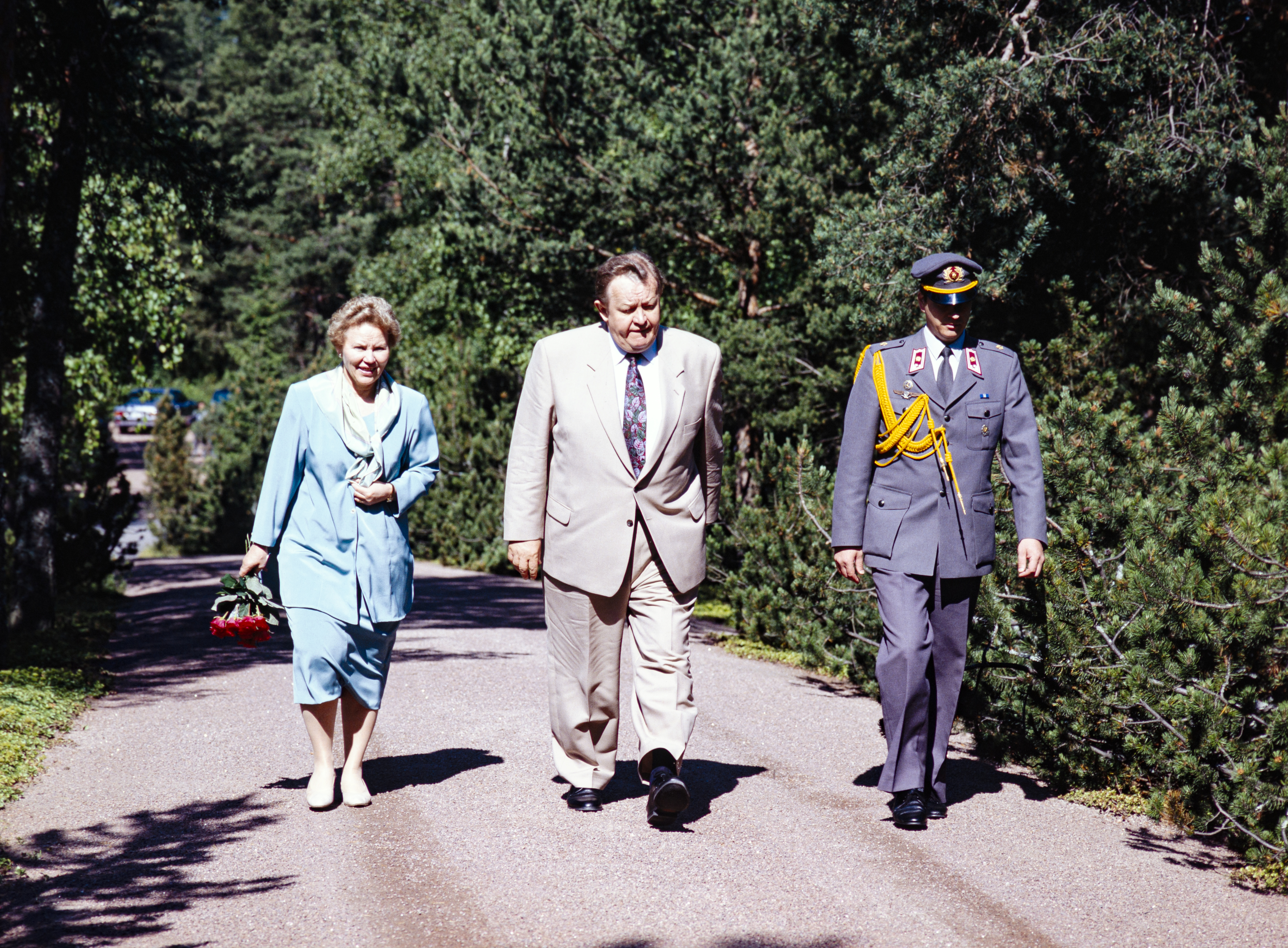
President Martti Ahtisaari and Eeva Ahtisaari in 1994

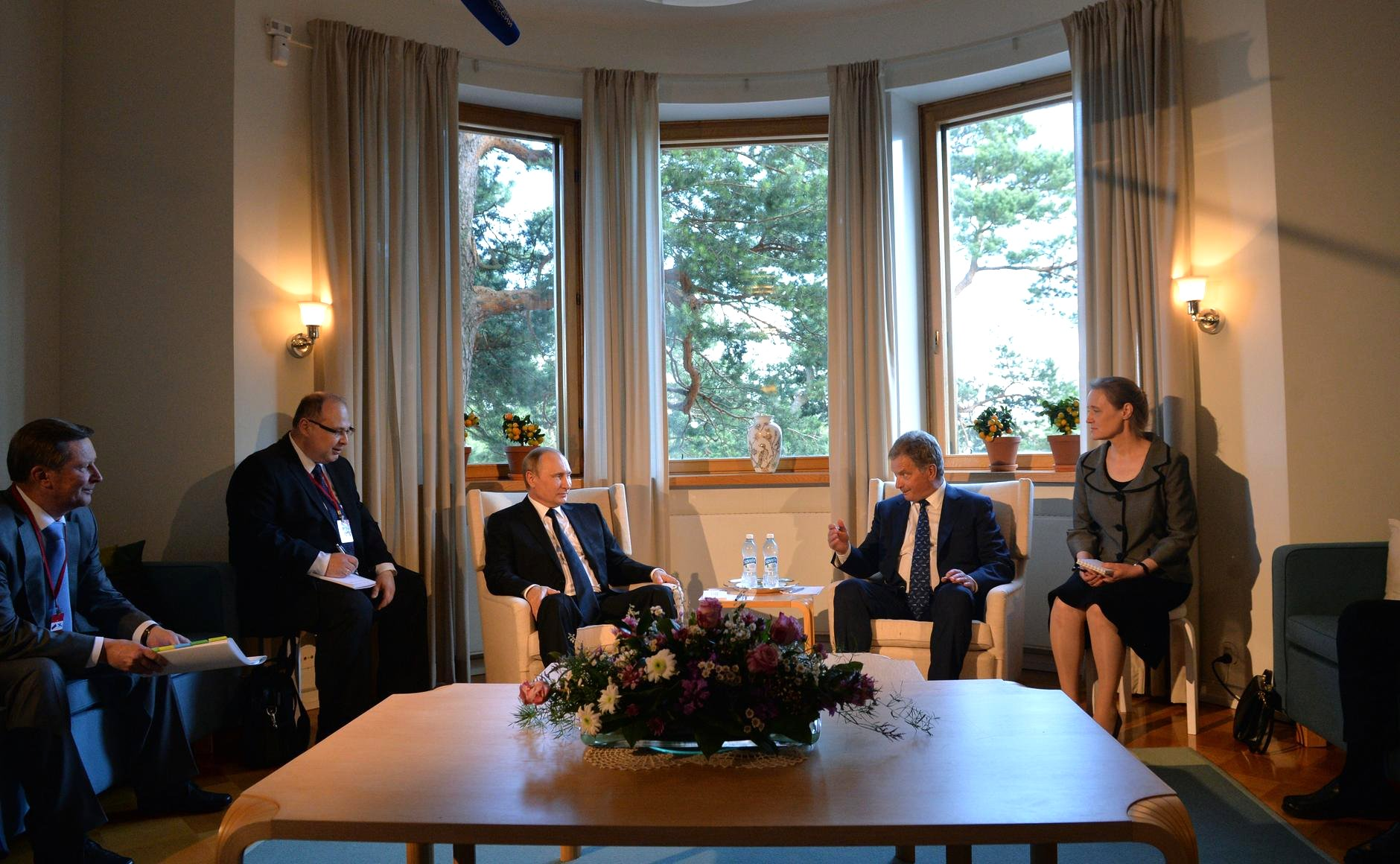
Negotiations between Russian President Vladimir Putin and Finnish President Sauli Niinistö took place in Kultaranta 2016

== See also ==
- Kesäranta
- Mäntyniemi
