= Merimasku =

- Former municipality
- Merimaskun kunta Merimasku kommun
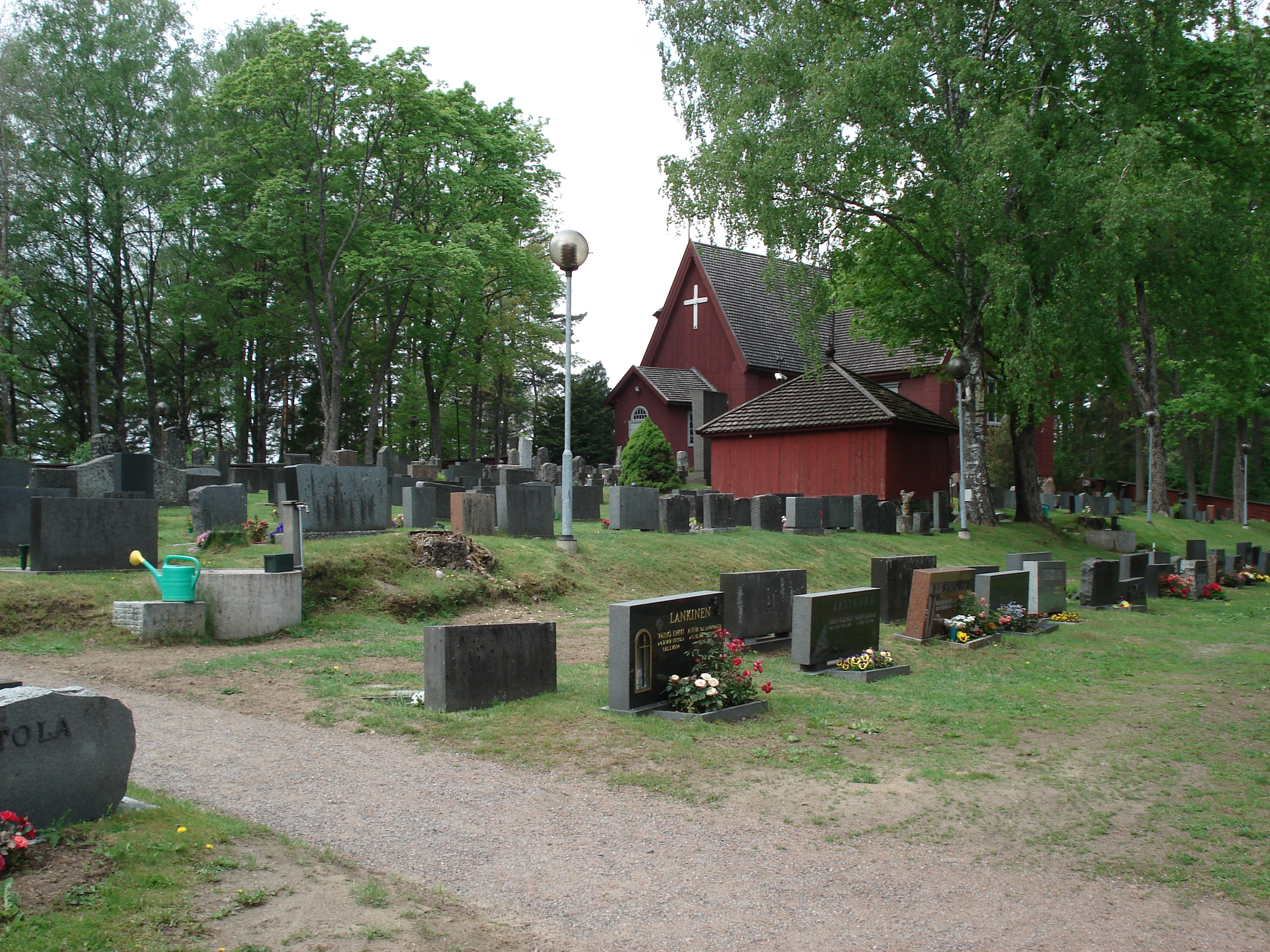
- The Merimasku Church, one of the oldest remaining wooden churches in Finland

- Coat of arms

- Location of Merimasku in Finland (2008).
- Interactive map of Merimasku
- Location within Southwest Finland Location within Finland Location within Europe
- Country: Finland
- Province: Western Finland
- Region: Southwest Finland
- Sub-region: Turku
- Merged with Naantali: January 1, 2009

Government
  - City manager: Juhani Kylämäkilä

Area
  - Total: 51.12 km^{2} (19.74 sq mi)
  - Land: 50.41 km^{2} (19.46 sq mi)
  - Water: 0.71 km^{2} (0.27 sq mi)
  - Rank: 417th

Population (2003)
  - Total: 1,508
  - Rank: 382nd
  - Density: 29.91/km^{2} (77.48/sq mi)
- +2.7 % change
- Time zone: UTC+2 (EET)
  - Summer (DST): UTC+3 (EEST)
- Official languages: Finnish
- Urbanisation: 57.9%
- Unemployment rate: 6.1%
- Website: https://www.merimasku.fi/

Merimasku (Finnish pronunciation: [ˈmeriˌmɑsku]) is a former municipality of Finland. It was, together with Rymättylä and Velkua, consolidated with the town of Naantali on January 1, 2009. Neighbouring municipalities of Merimasku were Askainen, Lemu, Masku, Naantali, Rymättylä and Velkua.

It is located in the province of Western Finland and is part of the Southwest Finland region. Merimasku comprised the northern part of Otava Island and a small portion of the mainland also belonged to the municipality.

The municipality had a population of 1,513 (31 December 2004) and covered an area of 51.12 km² (excluding sea) of which 0.71 km² is inland water. The population density was 30.01 inhabitants per km².

The municipality was unilingually Finnish.
