= Malkamäki =

Malkamäki is a Finnish surname that may refer to

- Aino Malkamäki (1894–1961), Finnish schoolteacher and politician
- Juho Malkamäki (1844–1928), Finnish farmer, lay preacher and politician
- Miko Malkamäki (born 1988), Finnish ice hockey defenceman
- Noelle Malkamaki (born 2001), American Paralympic athlete
