= Velkua =

- Former municipality
- Velkuan kunta Velkua kommun
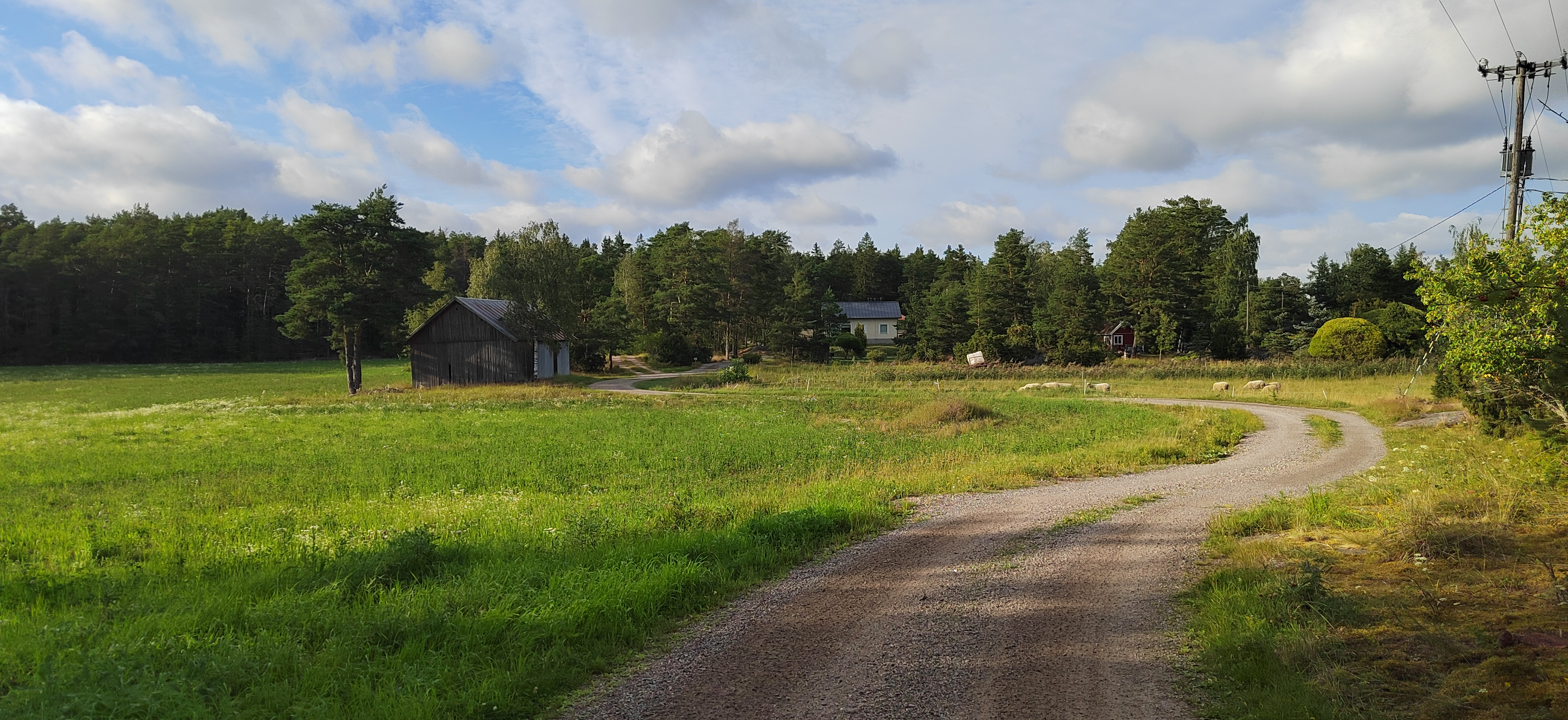
- Landscape in Velkua.

- Coat of arms

- Location of Velkua in Finland (2008).
- Interactive map of Velkua
- Location within Southwest Finland Location within Finland Location within Europe
- Country: Finland
- Province: Western Finland
- Region: Southwest Finland
- Sub-region: Turku
- Merged with Naantali: January 1, 2009

Government
  - City manager: Tiina Rinne-Kylänpää

Area
  - Total: 31.21 km^{2} (12.05 sq mi)
  - Land: 31.08 km^{2} (12.00 sq mi)
  - Water: 0.13 km^{2} (0.050 sq mi)
  - Rank: 427th

Population (2003)
  - Total: 233
  - Rank: 431st
  - Density: 7.50/km^{2} (19.4/sq mi)
- −2.9 % change
- Time zone: UTC+2 (EET)
  - Summer (DST): UTC+3 (EEST)
- Official languages: Finnish
- Urbanisation: 0.0%
- Unemployment rate: 10.3%
- Website: http://www.velkua.fi/

Velkua (Finnish pronunciation: [ˈʋelkuɑ]) is a former municipality of Finland. It was, together with Merimasku and Rymättylä, consolidated with the town of Naantali on January 1, 2009. Neighbouring municipalities of Velkua were Askainen, Iniö, Kustavi, Merimasku, Korpo, Rymättylä and Taivassalo.

It is part of the Southwest Finland region. The municipality had a population of 245 (2005-12-31) and covered an area of 30.07 km² (excluding sea) of which 0.13 km² is inland water. The population density was 8,1 inhabitants per km².

The municipality was unilingually Finnish. By population it was the smallest Finnish-speaking municipality in Finland at the time before the merger.

== History ==
The village of Palva, located on the homonymous island, was mentioned already in 1469. Its name may refer to a place where meat and fish were cured by hunters or to a site of worship. Palva was the original center of the area, becoming a separate chapel community in 1793, when it was a part of the Taivassalo parish. In the 19th century, the name Velkua began appearing for the chapel community after the largest island in it: Velkua or Velkuanmaa. A densely populated village on the island of Velkua, Velkuankaupunki, was established in the 19th century.

The municipality was established in the 1860s and Velkua had become the predominant name. Velkua became a separate parish in 1917.

Velkua was consolidated with Naantali in 2009.
