= Masku railway station =

Former railway station in Masku, Finland

Masku
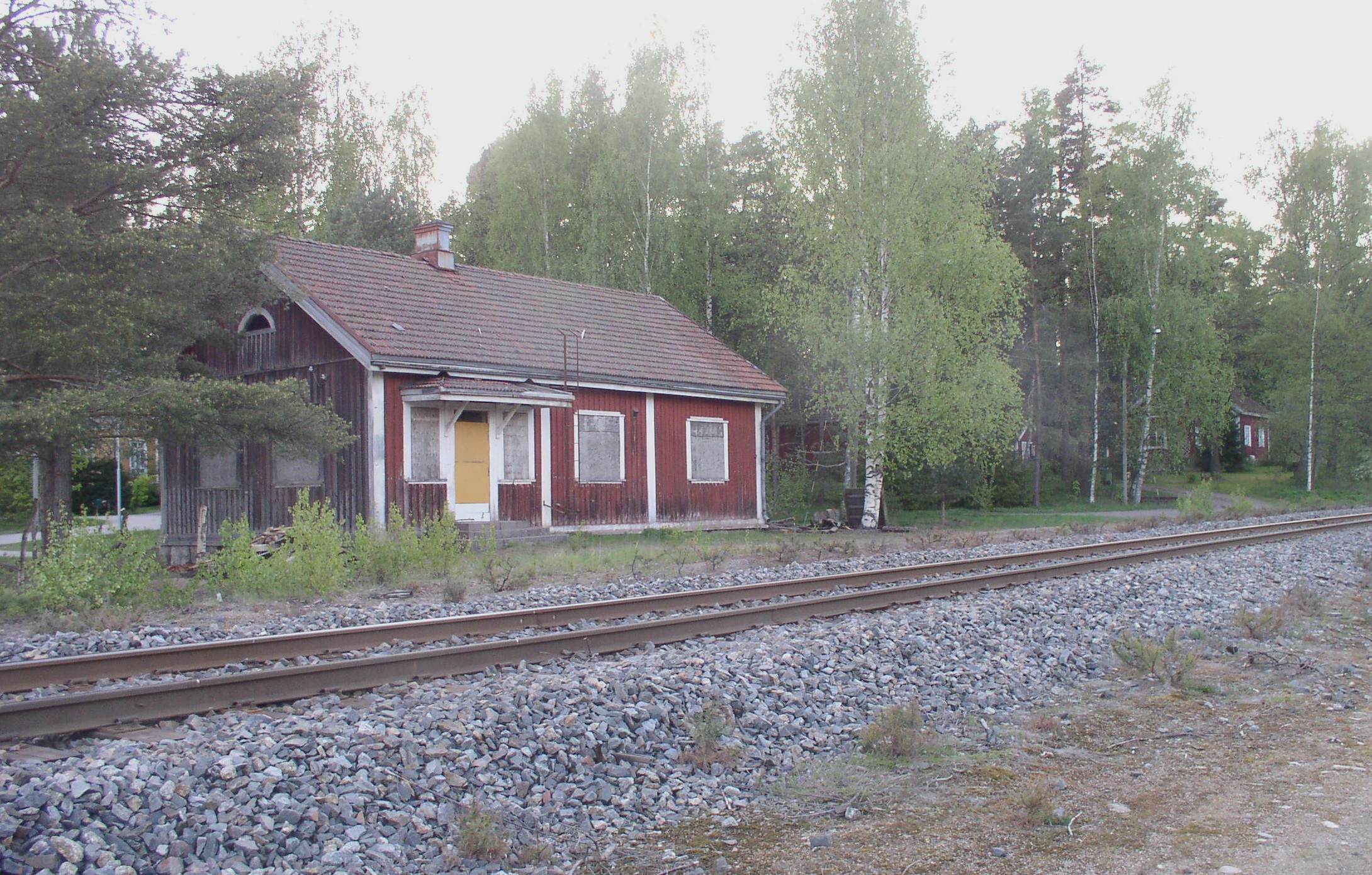
- Masku in 2008

General information
- Location: Paloasemantie, 21250; Masku; Finland
- Coordinates: 60°34′02.663″N 022°05′35.055″E
- System: VR station
- Owner: Finnish Transport Infrastructure Agency
- Operator: VR Group
- Tracks: Turku–Uusikaupunki

Other information
- Station code: Mku

History
- Opened: 1 September 1923
- Closed: 1 January 1993
Location

The Masku railway station (Finnish: Maskun rautatieasema, Swedish: Masku järnvägsstation) is a closed station located in the municipality of Masku, Finland. It is located along the Turku–Uusikaupunki railway; the nearest station with passenger services is Turku in the southwest.

== History ==
Masku is one of the original stations of the Uusikaupunki railway, having been opened as a laiturivaihde – a staffed halt with a rail yard containing at least one switch – with the rest of the line on 1 September 1923. It was subservient to the Raisio station, and was only staffed by a single worker, who was accommodated with a sauna, barn as well as a hectare's worth of farmland. The station also hosted a post office until 1956, after which it moved into a building owned by the Maskun Säästöpankki bank.

Masku grew greatly in the post-war era, no less in part due to evacuees settling there from the parts of Karelia ceded to the Soviet Union; in 1947, 30% of the people living in the municipality had emigrated there from elsewhere. However, in 1967, Masku became an unstaffed station on 1 June 1967, and its rail yard was dismantled in 1978, making it a halt. The halt was closed altogether on 1 January 1993 upon the cessation of passenger services on the Uusikaupunki line.
