= Casper Eichman =

- Born: c. 1590; Lübeck
- Died: 26 January 1668 (probable); Nystad, Finland
- Occupations: Merchant, alderman, mayor, member of parliament

Casper Eichman (born c. 1590, died probably 26 January 1668) was a merchant and municipal official active in Finland during the 17th century. Raised in Lübeck, he was one of many German burghers who migrated to Finland in the early part of the century. Eichman worked as a merchant and alderman in Åbo (Turku) for several decades, but financial difficulties forced him to leave the city. As mayor of Nystad (Uusikaupunki) he demonstrated administrative ability and initiative, becoming the town's dominant figure. He participated in several Diets and was one of the more active representatives of the Finnish burgher estate during the period.

== Biography ==
=== Arrival in Finland ===
Casper Eichman was the son of Jochim Eichman, a merchant in Lübeck. According to his own account, he arrived in Åbo (Turku) as a merchant in 1615. He was appointed alderman of the city in 1632 and held this position for nearly twenty years, combining his civic duties with extensive commercial activity throughout.

=== Commercial activities ===
Eichman belonged to the ruling burgher class of Åbo that dominated foreign trade in the 1620s and 1630s. His business encompassed both retail and wholesale trade, as was typical of the era. He traded primarily in grain and maintained long-standing commercial ties with his native city of Lübeck — contacts that continued for decades, though with growing difficulties over time. Grain formed a significant share of the exports shipped from Åbo, which held staple town rights that gave it a monopoly on foreign trade in the region.

During the 1630s and early 1640s Eichman owned a ship of his own that sailed across much of the Baltic Sea. It is documented that the vessel called at both Lübeck and Norrbotten.

=== Financial difficulties and conflicts in Åbo ===
By the mid-1630s Eichman's financial problems had become apparent. He was sued on repeated occasions for delayed repayment of debts and breach of contract. Characteristically, he would offer to settle debts with goods other than those agreed upon — but rarely in cash.

In 1643 Eichman, together with two other aldermen, attempted to be relieved of his civic post by citing the demands of his trade. The county governor rejected the request. The following year the influential merchant and fellow alderman Gottfried Rosskamp publicly accused him before the court of being financially unreliable. The court took no formal position on the matter, suggesting that Eichman's precarious finances were already common knowledge in the city.

=== Mayor of Nystad ===
Eichman's move from Åbo to Nystad (Uusikaupunki) in the late 1640s has been interpreted as an attempt to escape an untenable situation. In 1649, on the recommendation of Governor-General Per Brahe, he was appointed mayor of Nystad by Count Gustaf Gustafsson af Wasaborg. Nystad was at that time the seat of the newly established County of Vasaborg, a noble county granted to the Vasaborg family under the Swedish system of noble donations.

As mayor, Eichman carried out extensive administrative reforms drawing on his experience in Åbo. Previously unknown civic offices were established and the composition of the council was reshaped. The workload of the town court increased substantially, and several officials — including relatives of Eichman — were recruited from Åbo and placed under his patronage.

In the early 1650s he also served for a period as acting bailiff of the county, and emerged overall as the town's dominant figure. He readily assumed the role of the town's "father" and "foreman" in accordance with the patriarchal social system of the time.

=== Parliamentary duties ===
Casper Eichman was one of the most active participants in Diets and representative assemblies among the Finnish burghers of the 17th century. In total he represented Åbo and Nystad at four Diets and twice at committee or provincial assemblies.

At the committee Diet of 1635, when he was chosen as a young alderman to represent Åbo, he tried by every means to avoid the journey — reflecting the attitude typical of the burgher estate at the time, which regarded parliamentary service as an unwelcome obligation rather than a right or opportunity.

In 1655 a conflict arose between Nystad and the County of Vasaborg over donated land. Eichman found himself in an impossible position: he was simultaneously mayor holding a comital commission, tax farmer of the town tolls, and representative of the townspeople — three roles with conflicting interests. Despite his efforts to avoid the matter he was compelled to travel to the Diet. The conflict resulted in a definitive break between him and the county, further undermining his financial position.

By the Diet of 1659 the situation had changed entirely: as an economically pressured mayor, Eichman hastened to Gothenburg to attend, despite the president of the Turku Court of Appeal having explicitly forbidden him to accept the assignment. He hoped to secure personal benefits such as tax exemption or a small grant following the prolonged wars of the era.

=== Later years and dismissal ===
Between 1653 and 1657 Eichman leased the town toll and excise duties in Nystad. The arrangement proved financially burdensome due to overly optimistic revenue projections, rising costs, and competing privilege claims from the holders of rights in the County of Vasaborg. As a toll farmer he also belonged to a profession that enjoyed little popularity anywhere.

These financial strains contributed to the erosion of his position. Eichman was dismissed from the mayoralty for the first time in 1663, but was reinstated shortly afterwards by a decision of the regency government of Charles XI. He most likely remained in office until around 1667, when he was probably dismissed for the final time. No certain account of events during the 1660s can be given, as the town's archive was completely destroyed.

=== Family ===
Casper Eichman married Elisabeth, daughter of Henrik Jacobi Finno, later vicar of Tavastkyro, who was himself the son of the reformer Jacob Finno, a pioneering figure in Finnish-language religious literature. The couple had nearly ten children, several of whom attained prominent positions in the estate-based society of the time.
