= Awakening (Finnish religious movement) =

Lutheran religious movement in Finland

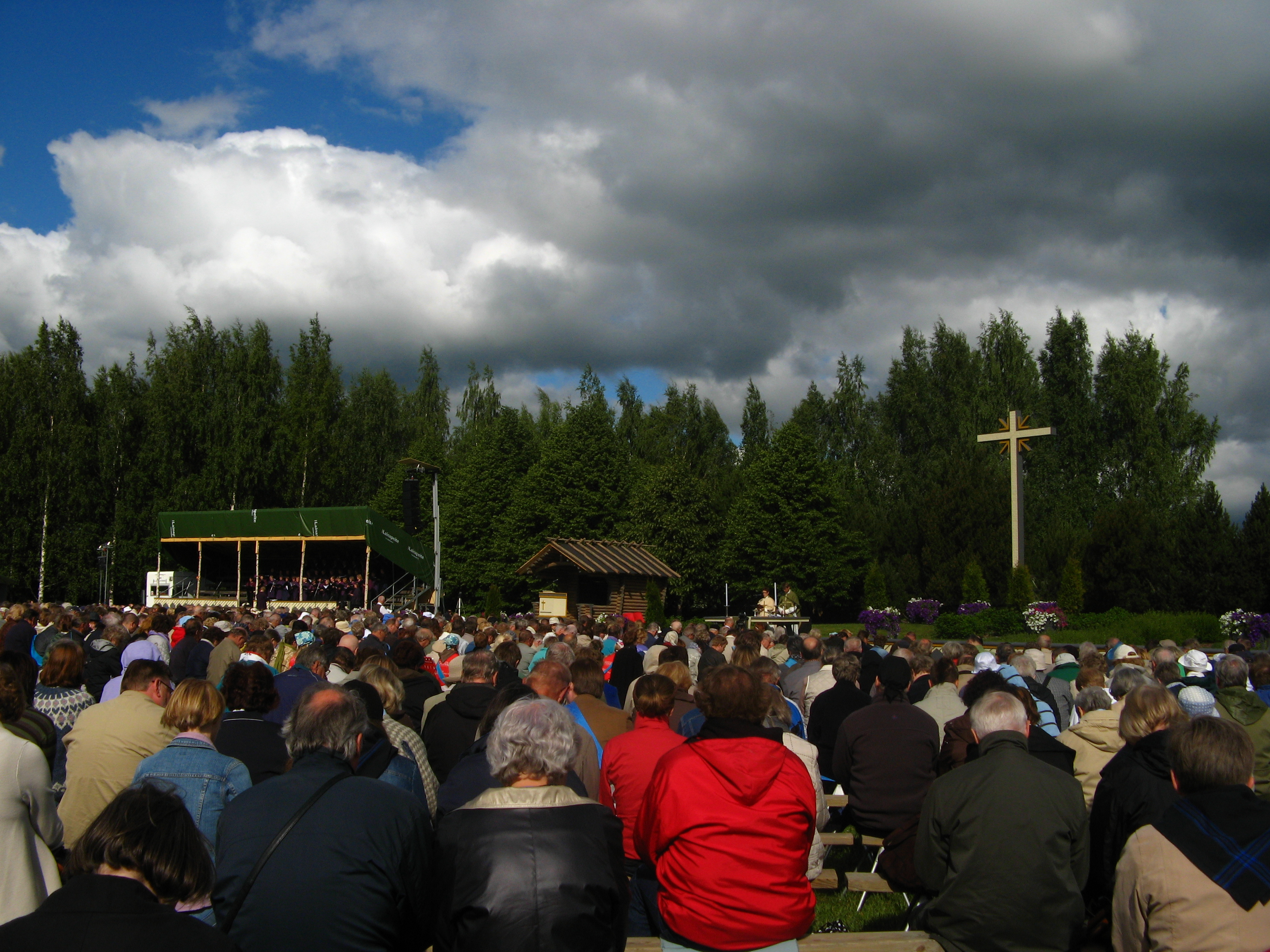
Herättäjäjuhlat, awakening festival in Seinäjoki in July 2009

The Awakening (Finnish: herännäisyys, Finnish pronunciation: [ˈherænːæi̯syːs]; or körttiläisyys, Finnish: [ˈkørtːilæi̯syːs]) is a Lutheran religious movement in Finland which has found followers in the provinces of Savo and Ostrobothnia. The origins of the movement are in the 18th century. It has functioned inside the Evangelical Lutheran Church of Finland throughout its existence. Formerly very Pietist, the movement is currently considered within mainstream Finnish Lutheranism.

== Main characteristics ==
Theologically, the Awakening emphasized the greatness of God, the sinfulness of man, and the insignificance of human efforts towards salvation (see monergism).

Today, the Awakening movement is widely known in Finland through an annual Awakening Festival Herättäjäjuhlat. The festival, held in July, attracts around 30,000 visitors and remains the second largest annual religious event in Finland.

The Awakening brought with it a form of the conventicle known as the seurat which consists of singing of hymns as prayer interrupted with short speeches as commentary to the prevailing mood.

== History ==
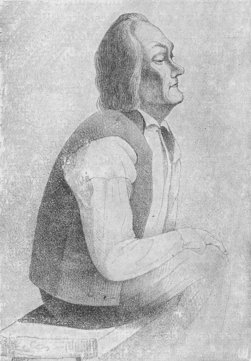
Paavo Ruotsalainen (1777–1852).

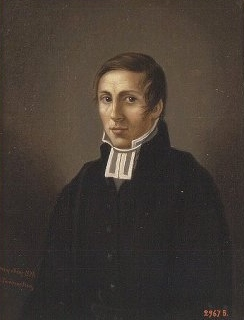
Nils Gustav Malmberg (1807-1858)

It is nowadays widely assumed that the roots of Herännäisyys lay in several 18th-century popular religious revival movements e.g. in Savo province. There were occasions when groups of people had trance-like religious experiences, for instance in the fields when collecting hay. The most famous of these occurred on Telppäsniitty in 1796. The original leader of the movement was Juhana Lustig.

Paavo Ruotsalainen represents a new kind of personality of the 19th-century, formed by the emerging reading habit in the countryside at a period when especially religious literature became available for wider audience. Instead of the mythological religious leader he is portrayed as in later literature, a farmer without formal education, he consumed religious literature and engaged in religious life of people whilst developing a skill of containing the arising religious ecstasies of people. His main achievement was the application of learning of devotional literature in support of religious life and delivering consoling spiritual advice on the basis of his experience.

Gradually, in the 1820s, Paavo Ruotsalainen rose as the leader figure in the movement. Simultaneously a religious revival started in Kalajoki. The movement was encouraged by pastors Jonas Lagus and Nils Gustav Malmberg. In the 1830s the two revivals got in touch and united. The movement has always been strongest in Savo, Ostrobothnia and in Kainuu. Through Lutheran clergy, its influence has expanded beyond the region of origin.

In the mid-19th century, the unity of the movement was challenged. Eventually the Evangelical revival led by Fredrik Gabriel Hedberg split from the movement and was organized separately. Simultaneously the movement entered a time of crisis when originally sympathetic clergymen distanced themselves from the movement in protest against Paavo Ruotsalainen, but especially N. G. Malmberg, whom they accused of sinful living. The movement lingered on as a popular movement supported and organized independently by adherents among the peasant population.

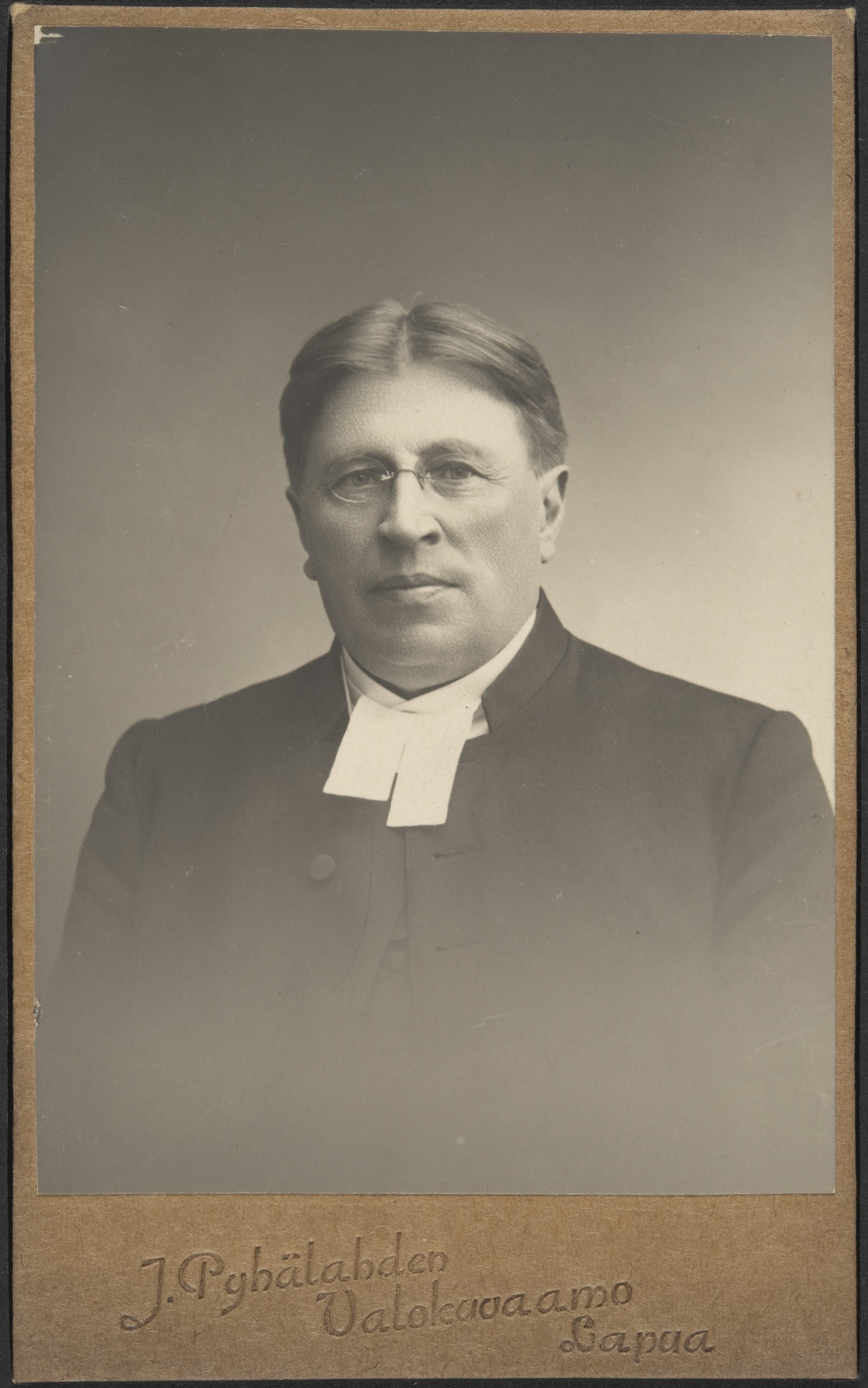
Wilhelmi Malmivaara, the founder of the movement peridical "Hengellinen Kuukauslehti", hymnwriter and leader of the Awakening movement.

Later, interest of Lutheran clergy with Pietist leanings was revived and an element of national revival was added. In 1880s the son of Nils Gustav Malmberg, Wilhelmi Malmivaara, rose to a leading position. He embraced modern means of communication by founding the periodical Hengellinen Kuukauslehti in 1888 and establishing the publishing company Herättäjä 1892. The movement was institutionalized through the founding of the Herättäjä Society (Sisälähetysseura Herättäjä) in 1912. The movement was positioned with the political nationalist right-wing movements.

According to a poll taken by Church Labor Unions in 2010, 48% of the Finnish Lutheran clergy recognized the influence of awakening in their thinking and 28% were associated with the movement (N=660). Thus, those reflecting the heritage of the Awakening form the largest group in clergy.

== Religious views ==
The movement strictly holds on to the Lutheran theological basis of the church of Finland. However, its mission is to point of the significance of faith in the life of the individual and empower people to follow Christ. The movement strongly emphasized that faith and salvation are acts of God. Humans cannot contribute towards their salvation. Salvation is the act of God and the Holy Spirit alone according to Luther's principle sola gratia. God is great, human beings are small. The Gospel is preached on a low level amongst the people where the movement is also lived.

Religious views have been formulated primarily by the early leaders of the movement. Among them, especially Paavo Ruotsalainen's views still continue to influence thinking. Today, it is a moderate movement accepting the ordination of women as pastors and having a liberal attitude toward sexual minorities. A study published in 2010 by the Finnish Church Research Centre revealed that supporters of the Awakening differ significantly from the supporters of other Finnish Lutheran revival movements in their liberal views toward e.g. sexual ethics.

== Religious traits and customs ==
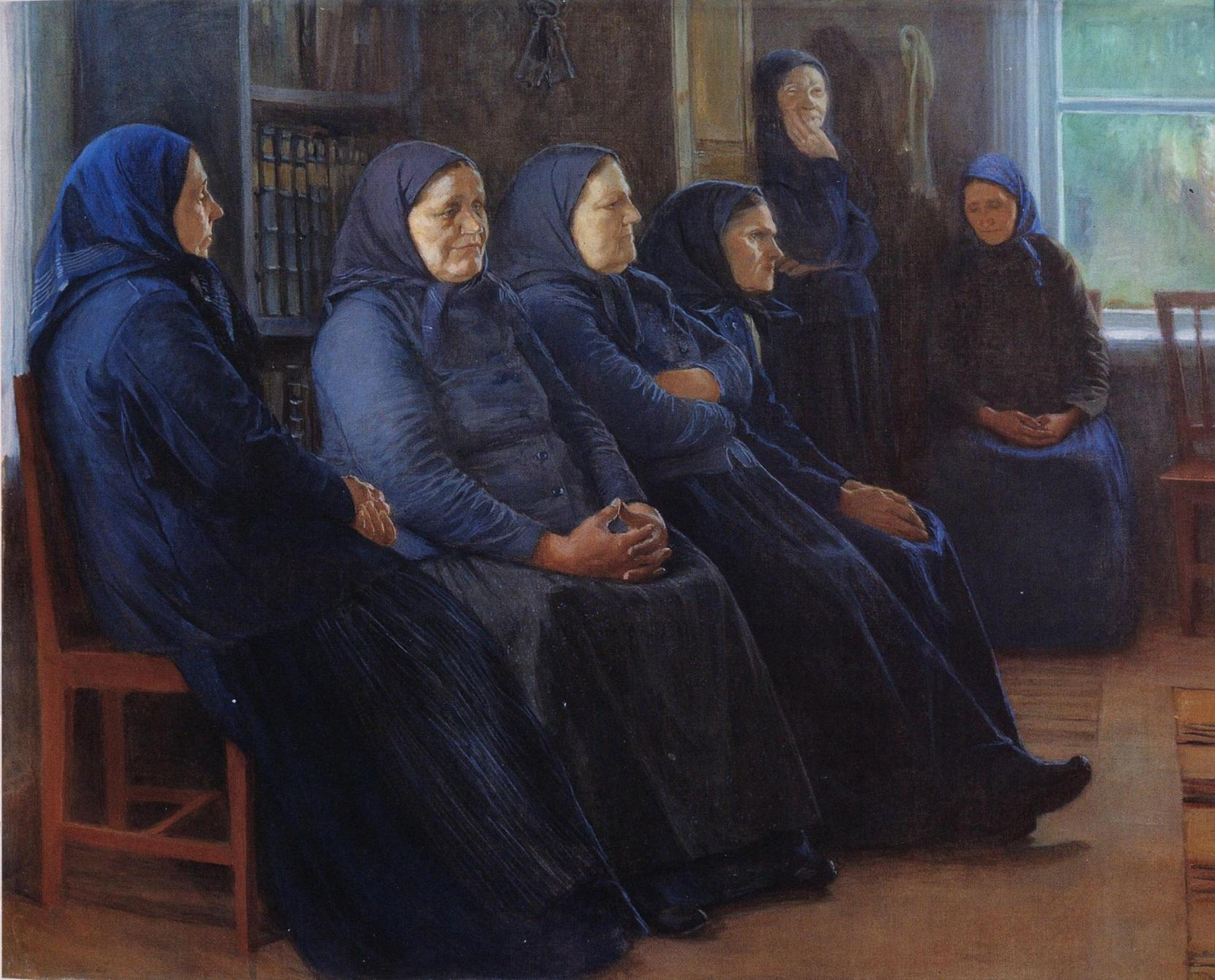
Venny Soldan-Brofeldt: Women at the conventicle (1898). View from the artist's home, vicarage of Iisalmi.

It has been typical to the movement to emphasize a quiet and simple life and taking responsibility in society. In modern times the movement expressed concerns about social justice in Finnish society.

Conventicle or seurat are the typical religious gathering of the movement. Traditionally they were organized in homes, but can nowadays also take place in congregation halls and other places. Typically, seurat lasts about one hour. Hymns are sung in a meditative rhythm without accompaniment. The text of hymns is mostly prayer. Singing is interrupted by short speeches. The original form of seurat is democratically organized: only few speakers are invited and opportunity is given for anyone present to speak. Speech is usually held in a sitting position from the place of the speaker — not from a pulpit. Hymn selection is also free: anyone can select and start a hymn. If a speech is considered inappropriate, it is, according to custom, acceptable to interrupt the speaker by starting a hymn. Often the hymns and speeches are spontaneously thematically related, thus forming a chain of thoughts. It is the custom to start the gathering with coffee and end it with free discussion. This also provides opportunity for participants to withdraw into private discussion with pastors or lay speakers if necessary.

The hymnal of the movement is Siionin Virret (Hymns of Zion), which originally was a translation of a Swedish Herrnhut movement hymnal from 1740, Sions Sånger. The hymnal has been reorganized and complemented several times. The newest reformation was published in 2017. Many of the hymns have been included in the official hymnal of the Evangelical Lutheran Church. Most characteristic of the movement has been the meditative singing of its hymns.

Traditionally, typical for the movement has been a strict code of conduct for the adherents. Dancing, colorful clothes, theater and music have been frowned upon. The second Finnish name of the movement, körttiläisyys, is said to derive from the adherents' typical black clothing with a characteristic körtti (Swedish: skört) i.e. a pleat in the back. Adherents wanted to emphasize their freedom from fashion and simple life by dressing in simple black clothes and simple hairstyle. The use of characteristic clothing has declined and become a curiosity.

Reflecting capacity of renewal and a more tolerant bend, the movement has on several occasions organized 'rainbow conventicles' in order to create safe space for the LGBT community first in Helsinki as part of Helsinki Pride 2019 and as part of summer festival in 2023.

== In culture ==
Despite being traditionally even hostile to culture, the movement has inspired prominent Finnish artists and experienced a revival in the 1970s and 1980s by being featured in plays and in the hugely popular Finnish opera. The Finnish author Juhani Aho grew up within the movement and it was the subject of many of his novels and short stories. The Finnish composer Joonas Kokkonen produced the opera The Last Temptations, which portrayed the life of Paavo Ruotsalainen. The opera was composed for the famous Finnish bass Martti Talvela, whose friend was Awakening movement lay preacher Aku Räty.

== Organization and activities ==
Regional activity of Awakening Movement in Finland at 2007. Activity: Monthly Yearly

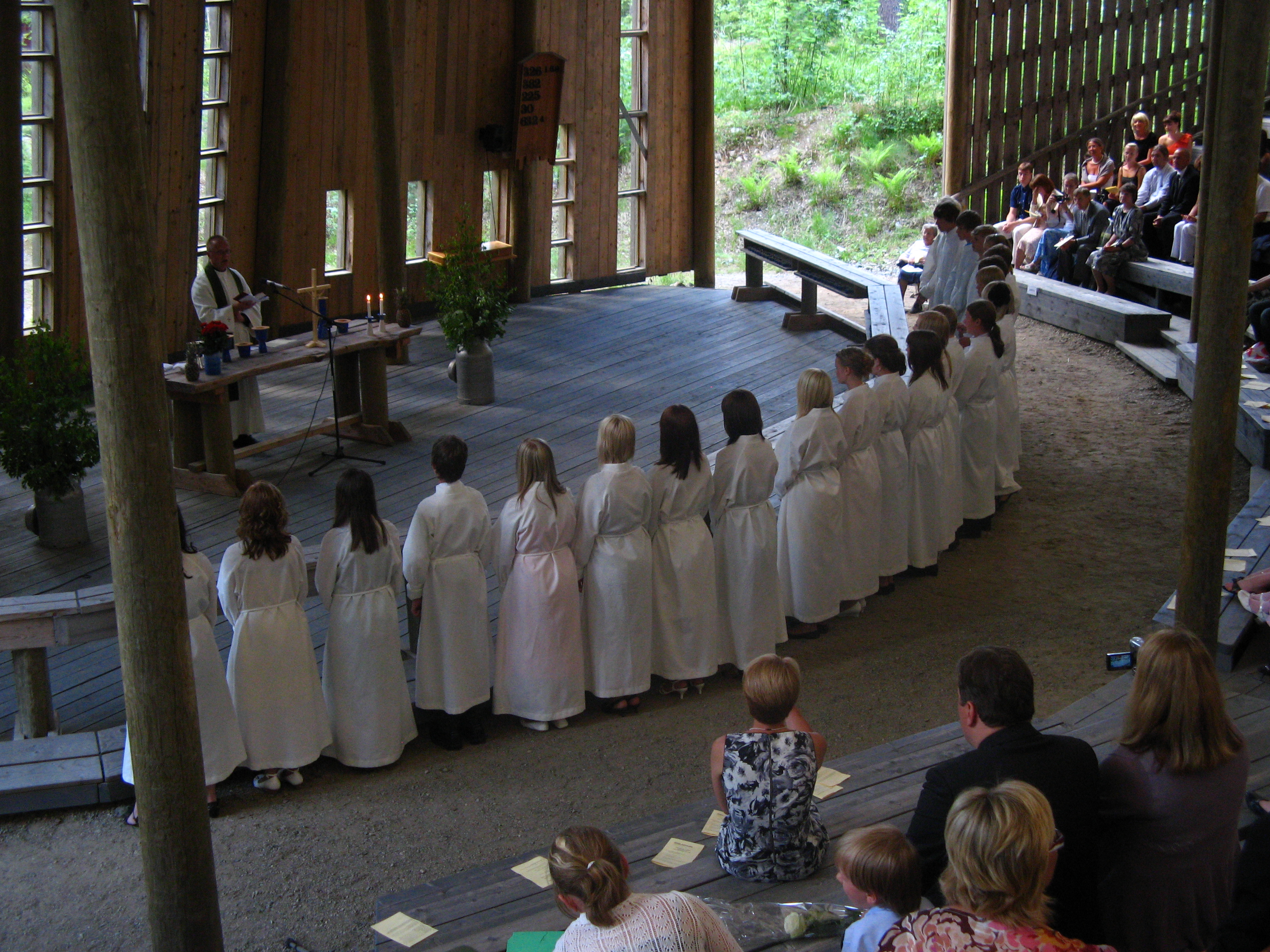
Confirmation and mass in outdoor church at the end of confirmation camp in Aholansaari center of the Awakening movement

The umbrella organization of the movement is Herättäjä-Yhdistys (the Awakening Society), which is based in Lapua. The former chair person (2010) of the society was a laywoman, Kaisa Rönkä, the first woman in Finland to act as the head of Finnish revival movements. Rönkä was succeeded by Jukka Hautala as the chairperson in 2011. The executive director of the society is Simo Juntunen. The society employs 20 persons — mostly pastors or lay preachers. Herättäjä-Yhdistys publishes books and music, organizes confirmation classes in the homestead of Paavo Ruotsalainen — Aholansaari in Nilsiä, and continues publication of Henki Magazine and other periodicals.

By far the most significant activity is the organization of the summer festival, herättäjäjuhlat. The festival is also an important source of income for the movement. The festival is organized on a moving basis in different towns in the original area of the movement and occasionally in larger cities.

Student ministry was originated when families wanted to provide a safe home in Helsinki for students of theology. Youth ministry was started in the 1970s. Christian folk high schools have been very important for the movement. They were established by the movement when the educational level in the countryside was still relatively low. Currently nine folk schools are loosely affiliated with the movement. They are located in Eurajoki, Jyväskylä, Kajaani, Lapua, Lieksa, Lapinlahti, Ylivieska, Turku and Valkeala.

The supporters of the movement were actively involved in the establishment of the Finnish Missionary Society. Missionary support is channelled through the FMS. Independently the movement has operations among Finns and Finno-Ugric people in Russia and Estonia.

== See also ==
- Paavo Ruotsalainen
- The Last Temptations
