= Virsikirja =

Official hymnal of the Evangelical Lutheran Church of Finland

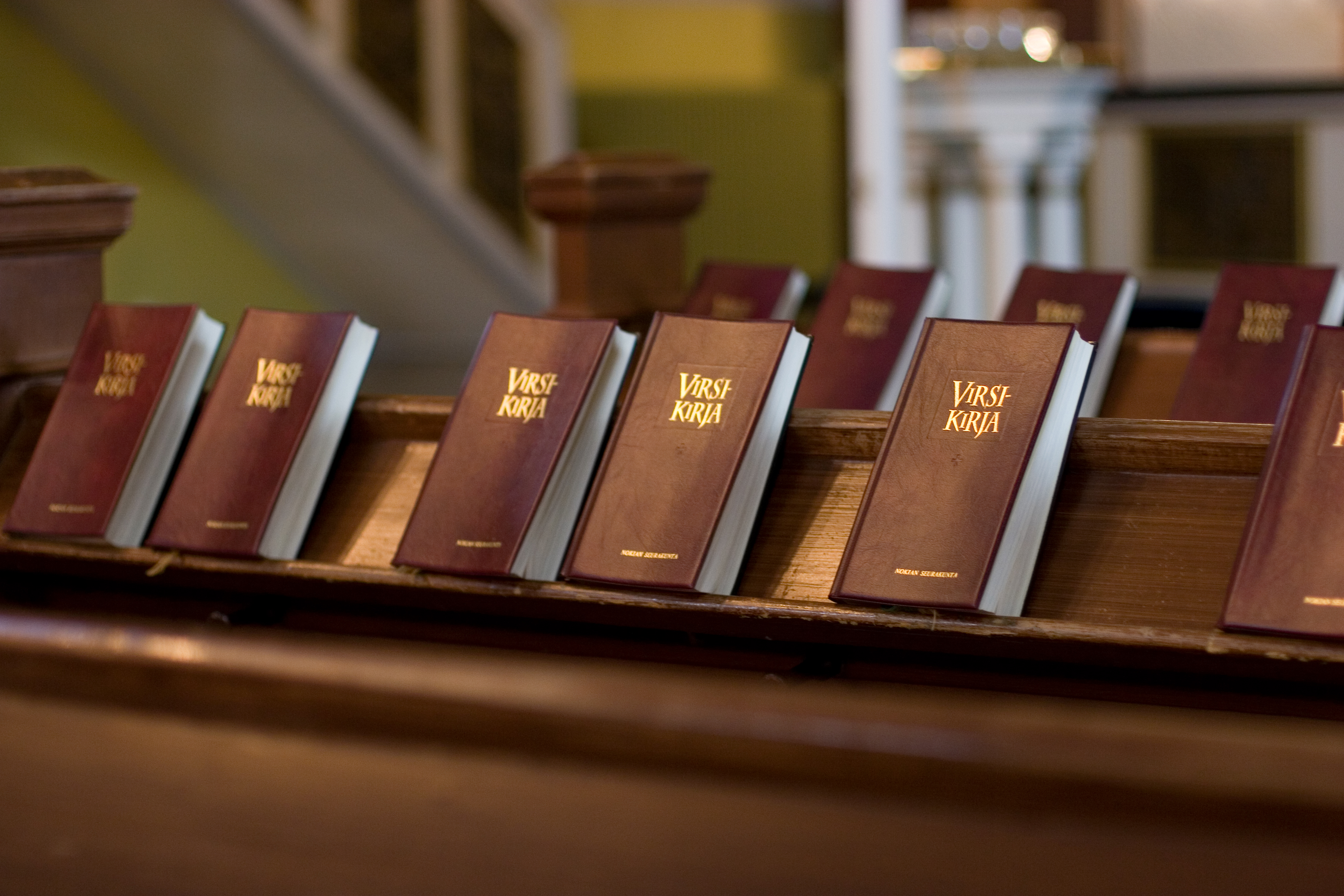
- Hymnals of the Finnish Evangelical Lutheran Church in the pew.
- Commissioned by: Evangelical Lutheran Church of Finland
- Approved for: Evangelical Lutheran Church of Finland
- Released: 1987
- Publisher: Various publishers.
- No. of Hymns: 632
- Service music: Liturgical supplement with order of liturgy and prayers, liturgical texts and songs.
← Hymnal of 1938	

Virsikirja (Finnish pronunciation: [ˈʋirsiˌkirjɑ], "hymn book") is the official hymnal of the Evangelical Lutheran Church of Finland, with the 1987 version consisting of 632 hymns, and with the 21st century version including up to 979 hymns.

== History ==
The first hymnal in Finnish was compiled and edited in 1583 by Jacobus Finno. Hemminki of Masku expanded the hymnal of Jacobus Finno to publish Yxi Wähä Suomenkielinen Wirsikirja, originally printed in Stockholm c. 1605. The earliest surviving imprint of this work was produced by Simon Johannis Carelius in 1607 in Rostock.

In 1701 bishop Johannes Gezelius the Younger published a hymnal that had been edited by Erik Cajanus. It was later commonly called the Old Hymnal (Vanha virsikirja) and was based on a Swedish hymnal from 1695. The Old Hymnal was used for a long time in Finland, until a new one was approved by the synod in 1886. This time a hymnal was published in both Finnish and Swedish language for use in the church of Finland.

A modernized and enlarged hymnal was then approved by the synod of the Evangelical Lutheran Church of Finland in 1938, with a Swedish-language version coming thereafter in 1943. To the original 633 hymns some 40 new ones were added in the supplement published in 1963. This increased the total number of hymns to 679.

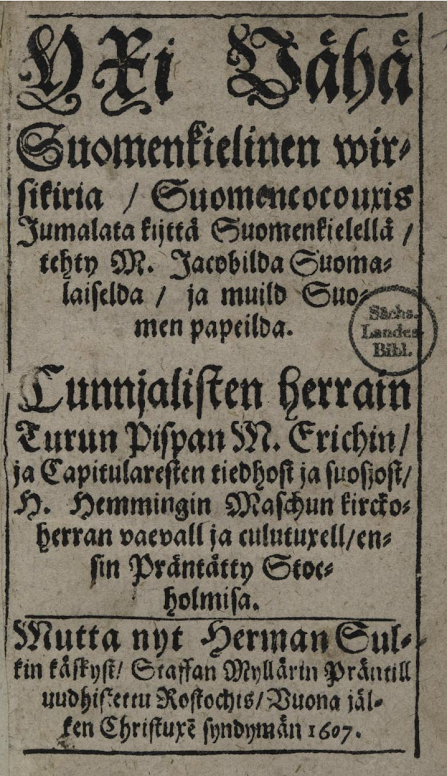
Title page of Yxi vähä suomenkielinen wirsikiria. Rostock, Stephan Möllemann, 1607.

== Current hymnals ==
The hymnal currently in use was approved in the synod in both Finnish and Swedish version in 1986 and taken into use on Advent 1987. After 2000, a liturgical supplement was added. In 1993 a version of the hymnal in Sámi language (Suoma samii salbmakirji) was also published.

The most important Finnish hymn lyricists are Hemminki of Masku, Jaakko Haavio, Julius Krohn, Elias Lönnrot, Wilhelmi Malmivaara, J. L. Runeberg, Anna-Maija Raittila and Niilo Rauhala. Raittila and Rauhala also participated in the reform of the hymnal in the 1980s and rewrote many texts of earlier authors.

== Addendum ==
An addendum to the Finnish hymnal was approved by the synod of the Church in November 2015 and introduced for use on the first day of Advent in 2016. The addendum consists of hymns with new lyrics and tunes, popular spiritual songs to be added to the hymnal and introduction of hymns and spiritual songs of international origin for the first time in different languages.

== See also ==
- Siionin virret
- Hymnody of continental Europe

== Literature ==
- Lempiäinen, Pentti (2007). Virsikirja sanasta sanaan: Virsikirjan raamattuviitteet, virsikirjan sanahakemisto (in Finnish) (2nd ed.). Helsinki: Kirjapaja. ISBN 978-951-607-520-7.
- Väinölä, Tauno (2008). Virsikirjamme virret (in Finnish). Helsinki: Kirjapaja. ISBN 978-951-607-611-2.
