= Masku =

- Municipality
- Maskun kunta Masku kommun
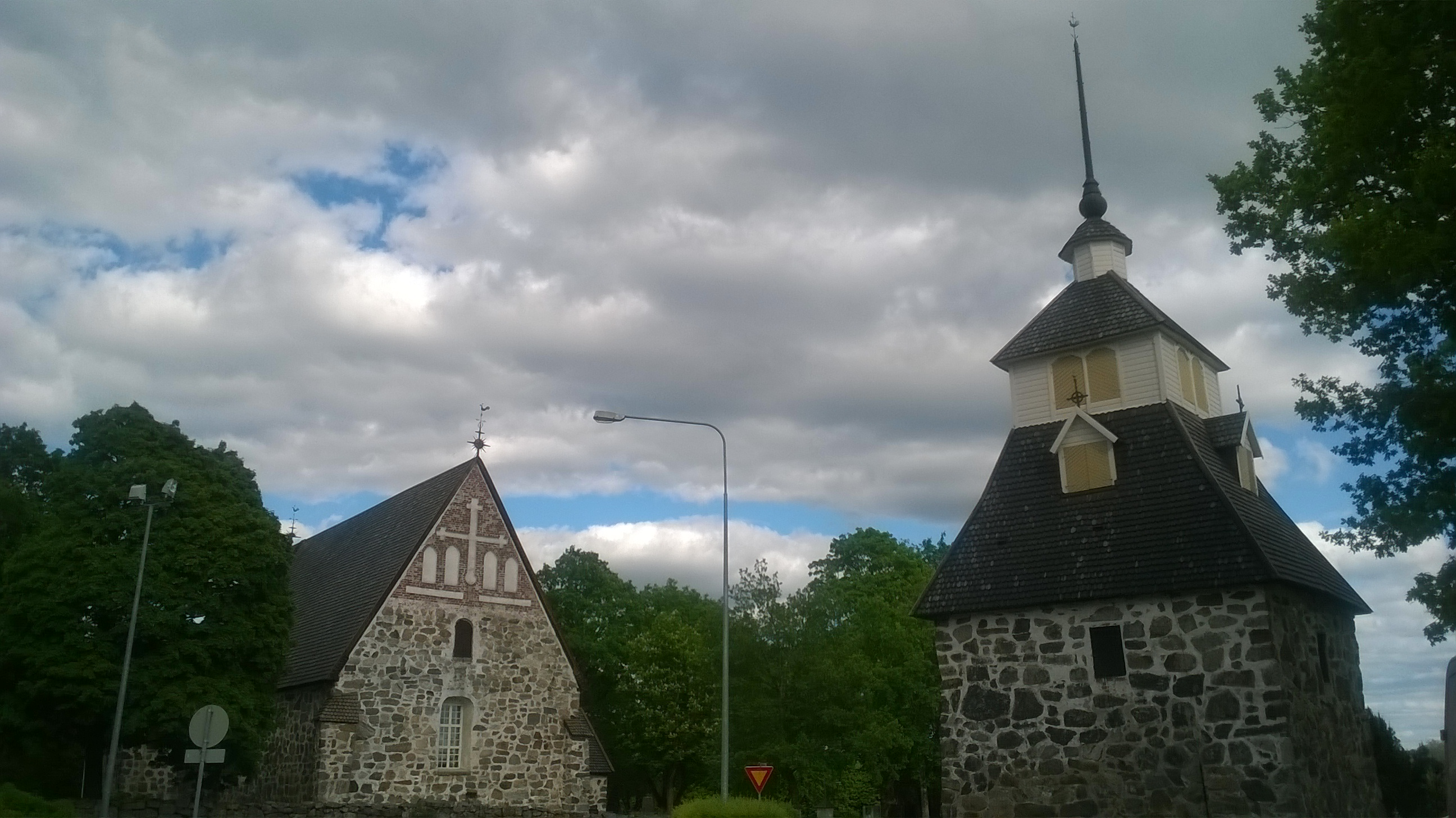
- Masku Church

- Coat of arms

- Location of Masku in Finland
- Interactive map of Masku
- Coordinates: 60°34′N 022°06′E
- Country: Finland
- Region: Southwest Finland
- Sub-region: Turku sub-region

Government
  - Municipal manager: Arto Oikarinen

Area (2018-01-01)
  - Total: 204.01 km^{2} (78.77 sq mi)
  - Land: 174.89 km^{2} (67.53 sq mi)
  - Water: 29.21 km^{2} (11.28 sq mi)
  - Rank: 271st largest in Finland

Population (2025-12-31)
  - Total: 9,612
  - Rank: 99th largest in Finland
  - Density: 54.96/km^{2} (142.3/sq mi)

Population by native language
  - Finnish: 95.8% (official)
  - Swedish: 1.2%
  - Others: 3%

Population by age
  - 0 to 14: 19.9%
  - 15 to 64: 61.1%
  - 65 or older: 18.9%
- Time zone: UTC+02:00 (EET)
  - Summer (DST): UTC+03:00 (EEST)
- Climate: Dfb
- Website: www.masku.fi

Masku (Finnish pronunciation: [ˈmɑsku]) is a municipality of Finland. It is located in the province of Western Finland and is part of the Southwest Finland region. The municipality, which is located about 17 kilometres (11 mi) just north of Turku, has a population of 9,612 (31 December 2025) and covers an area of 204.01 square kilometres (78.77 sq mi) of which 29.21 km^{2} (11.28 sq mi) is water. The population density is 54.96 inhabitants per square kilometre (142.3/sq mi).

The municipality is unilingually Finnish. The municipality has also been known as "Masko" in Swedish. The Swedish name no longer has official status, and is considered outdated according to the Institute for the Languages of Finland.

On 1 January 2009 the municipalities of Askainen and Lemu were consolidated with Masku.

== History ==
The original coat of arms of Masku.

Masku is one of the oldest parishes in Finland, having been established in the 13th century. It included Merimasku until 1577, when it was transferred to Naantali. The people of Masku also once held hunting grounds in the Turku archipelago, as evidenced by the toponym Maskinnamo (originally *Maskun Innanmaa) in Korpo. There is also a village called Maskulainen in both Rymättylä and Lemu, suggesting that the first settlers of those villages came from Masku.

Lemu and Askainen were consolidated with Masku in 2009. Masku adopted Askainen's coat of arms after the merger.

== Notable people ==
The most famous resident of Masku is Finnish tennis player Jarkko Nieminen. Well known football players from Masku include Kasper Hämäläinen, Riku Riski and Roope Riski. Baron C. G. E. Mannerheim, field marshal and 6th President of Finland was born in Louhisaari Manor of Askainen in 1867.

== Gallery ==
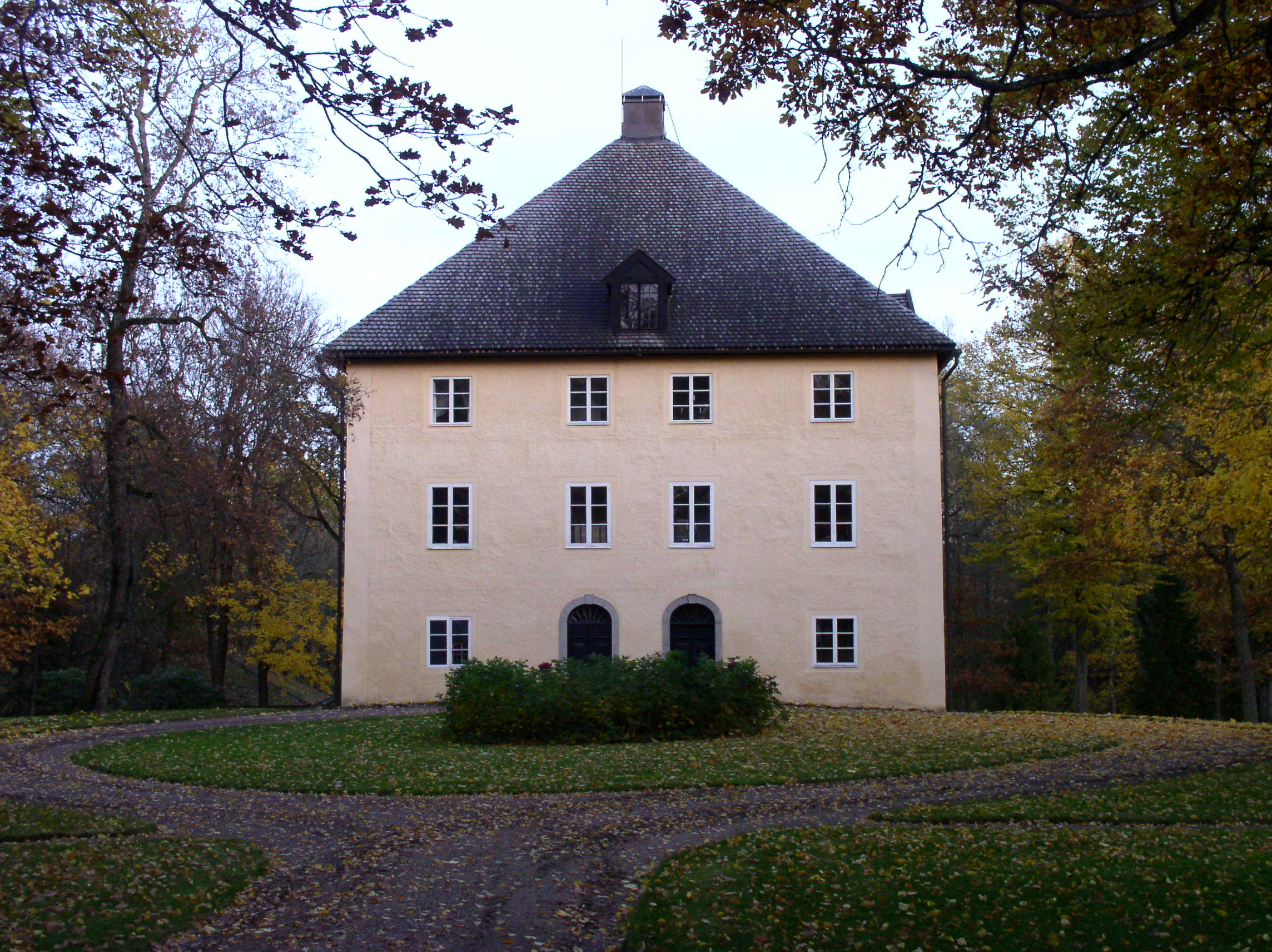
Kankainen Manor

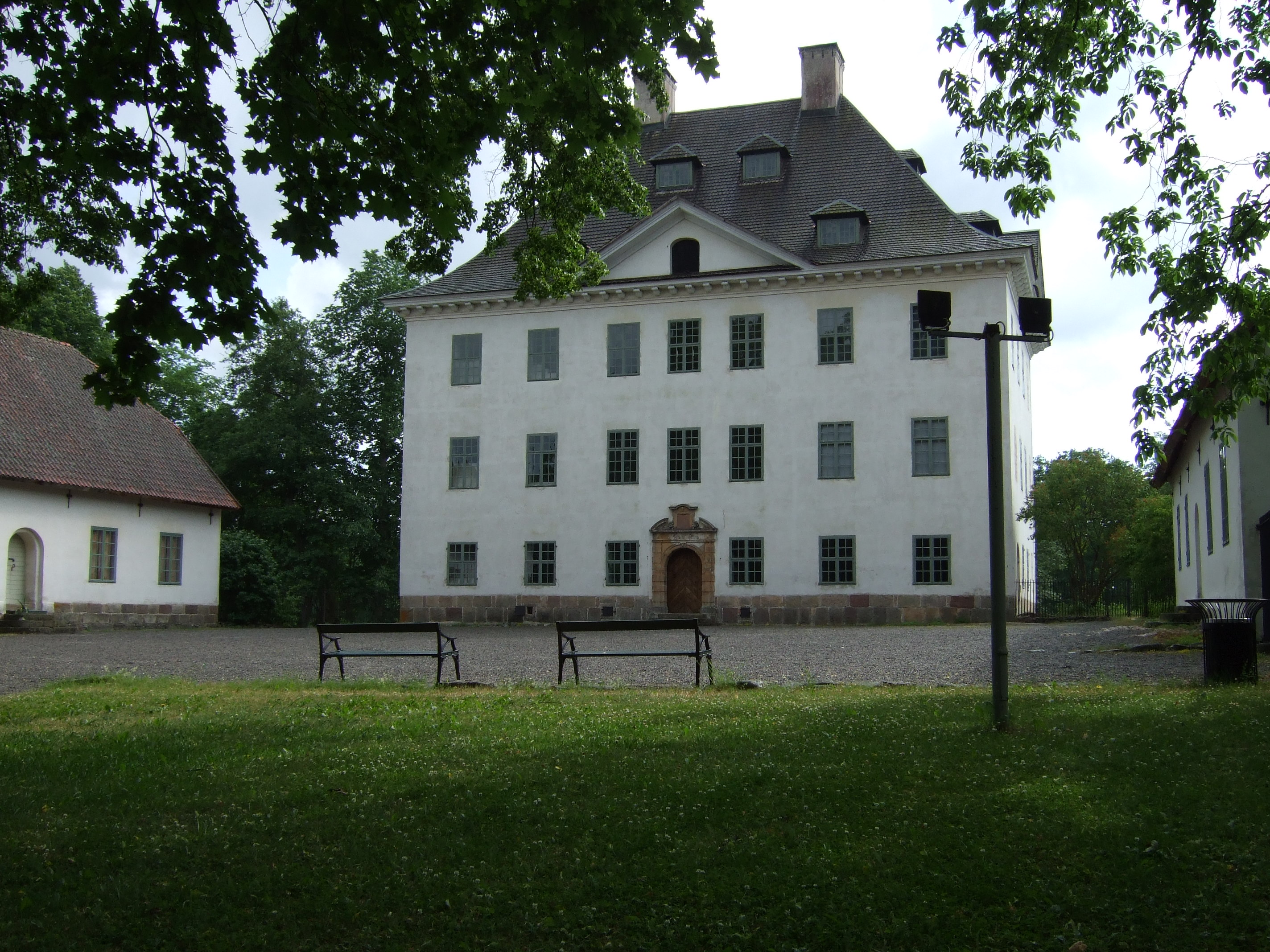
Louhisaari Manor

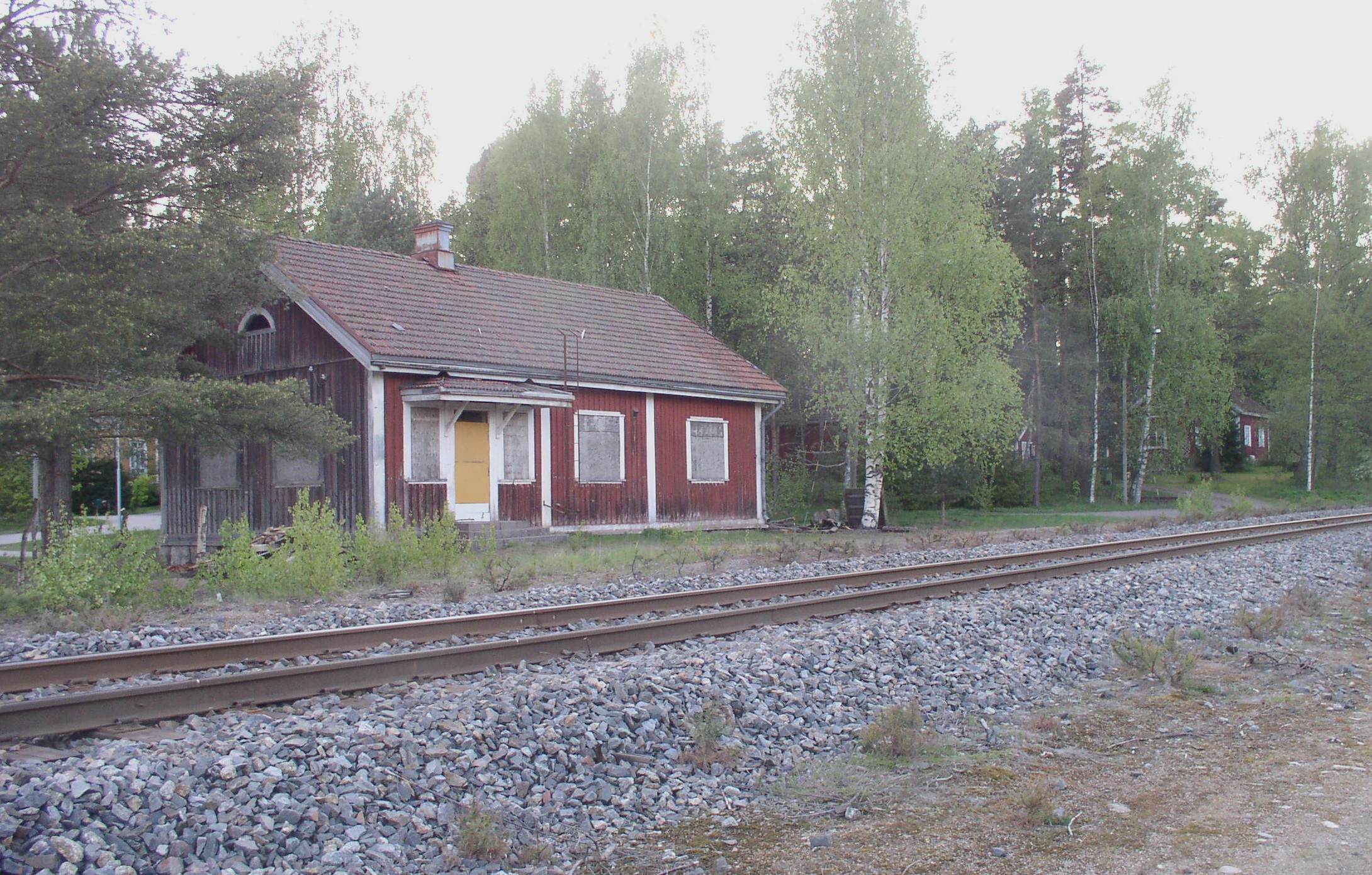
Masku railway station, closed in 1993

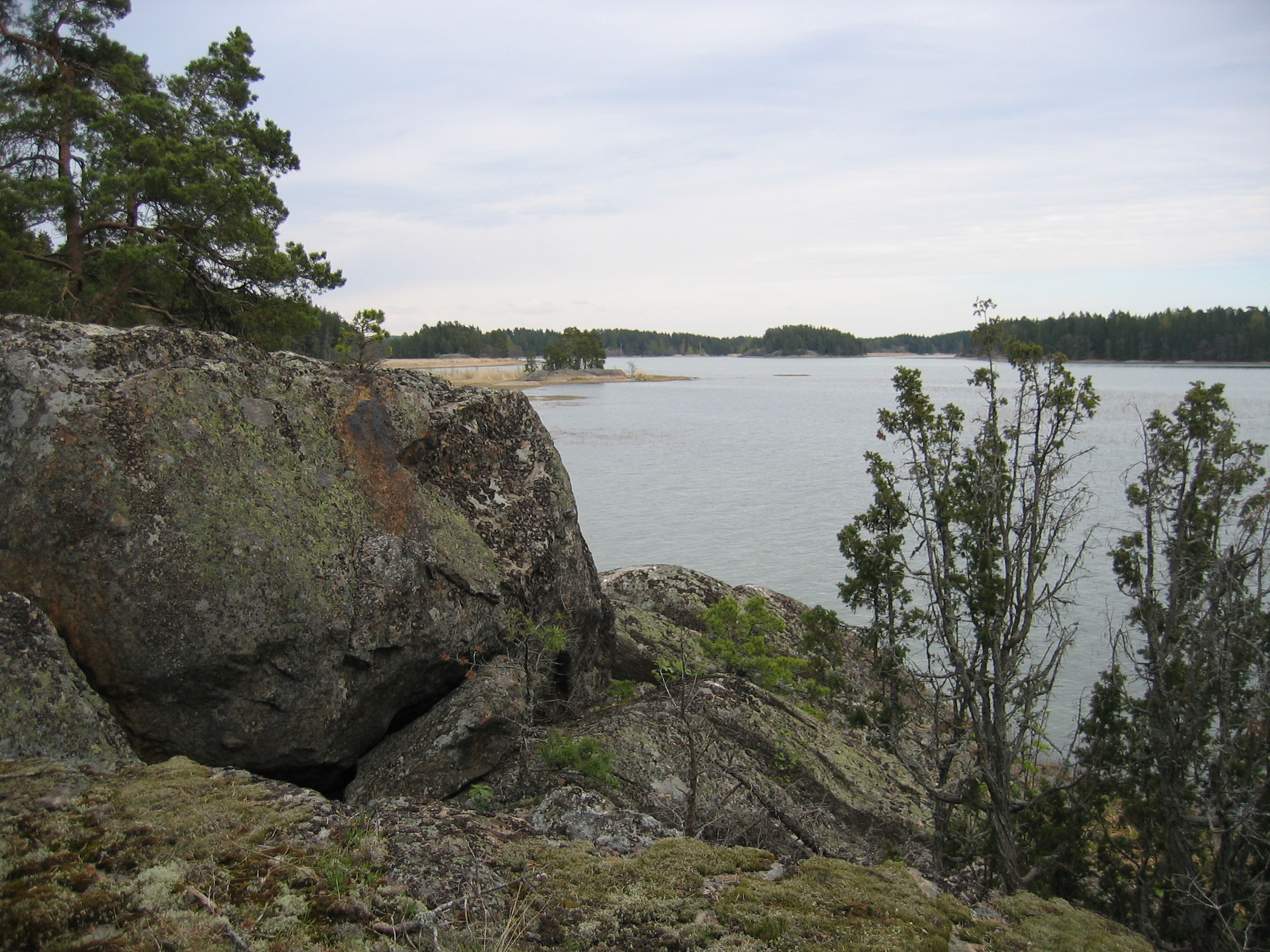
Oukkulanlahti

== See also ==
- Hemminki of Masku
- Stenberga Castle
