= Hemminki of Masku =

Hemminki of Masku (Finnish: Hemminki Maskulainen, Hemming Henrikinpoika Hollo; Latin: Hemmingius Henrici; c. 1550–1619) was a Finnish priest, hymn writer, and translator. His work, particularly Yxi Wähä Suomenkielinen Wirsikirja (A Small Finnish-language Hymnal) greatly influenced hymnody in the Finnish language.

== Life ==
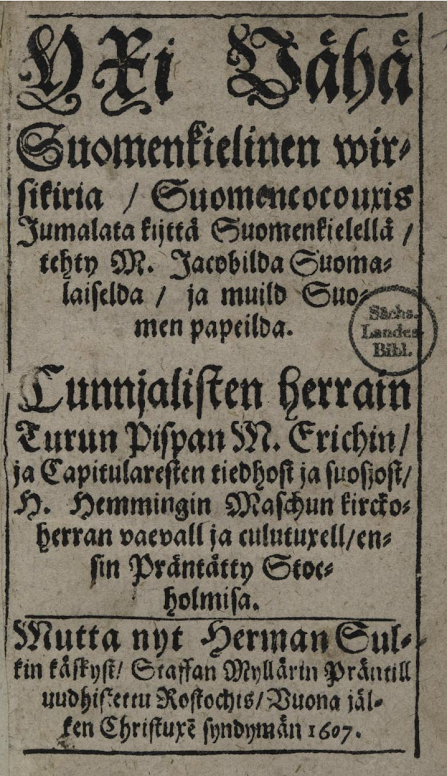
The title page of the earliest surviving copy of "Yxi vähä suomenkielinen wirsikiria." Rostock, Stephan Möllemann, 1607.

Hemminki, son of Henrik, was born around 1550 into a bourgeois family in Turku. He studied at the Cathedral School in Turku, where he was taught by Eerik Härkäpää (Erik Oxhuvud) and Jacobus Finno (Jaakko Suomalainen, James the Finn), both of whom studied abroad. Hemminki himself probably also studied abroad, but it is not certain whether this is the case.

Hemminki was ordained and became the vicar of Masku near Turku in 1586. During this time, he expanded the work of Jacobus Finno’s earlier Finnish-language hymnal to publish Yxi Wähä Suomenkielinen Wirsikirja, the first edition probably in 1605 of which the earliest surviving imprint is the produced by Simon Johannis Carelius in 1607 Rostock.

Yxi Wähä Suomenkielinen Wirsikirja contained all of Jacobus Finno’s 101 hymns, as well as 141 new ones. The new part was mainly translated in a rather free style into Finnish by Hemminki from Swedish, German, Latin, and Danish hymns. Hemminki himself probably wrote 26 of them. In addition, there are 5 hymns by Petrus Melartopaeus, a dean of the cathedral.

== See also ==
- Piae Cantiones
