= Wilhelmi Malmivaara =

Finnish priest and politician (1854–1922)

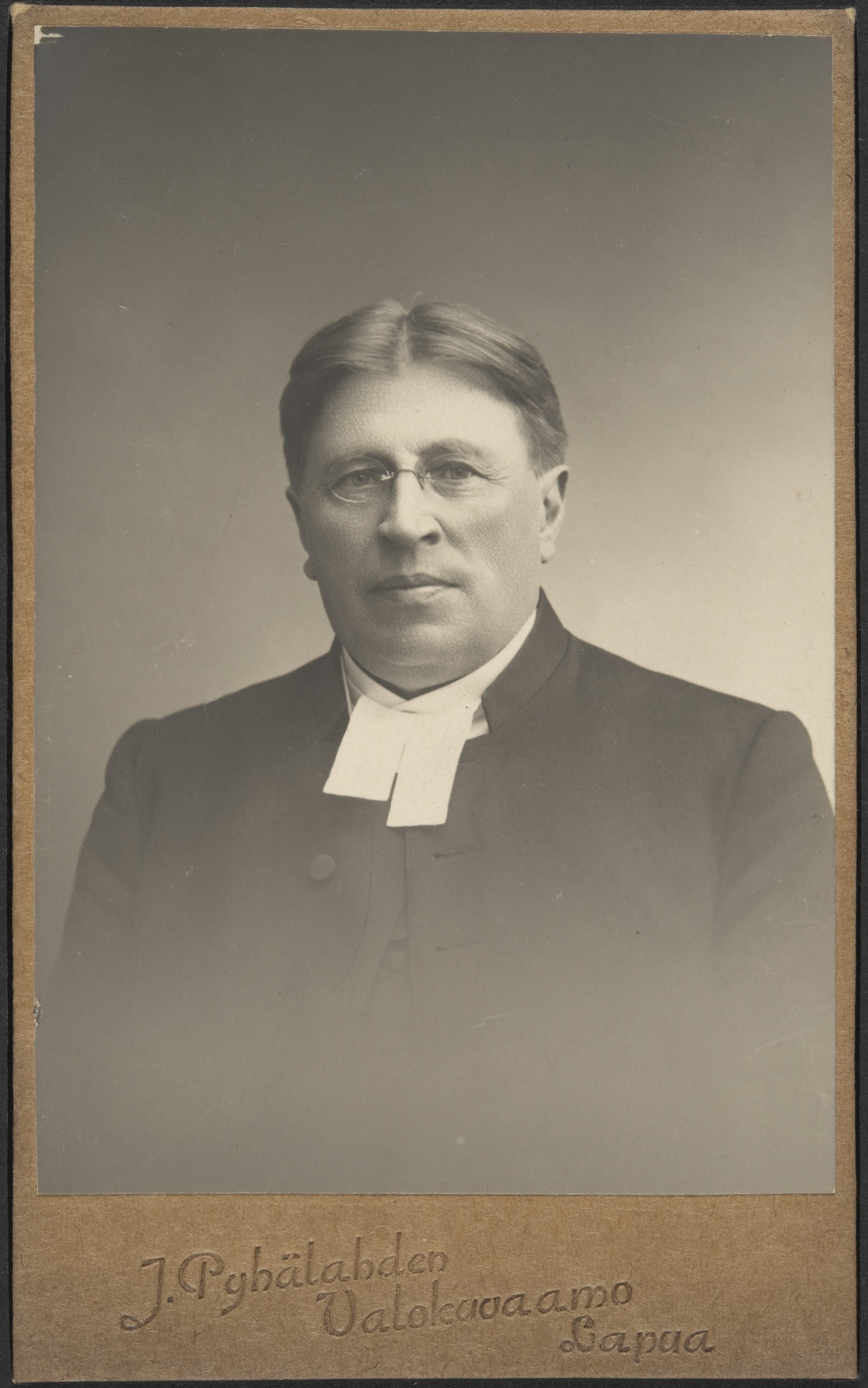
Wilhelmi Malmivaara

Wilhelm "Wilhelmi" Malmivaara (until 1900 Malmberg; 13 February 1854 – 12 January 1922) was one of the leaders of Finnish Awakening Christian movement at the beginning of the 20th century, as well as sitting in Parliament.

Malmivaara was born in Lapua, the son of Finnish Awakening movement leader Nils Gustav Malmberg and Helena Jaakontytär Huhtala. He was ordained into Christian ministry in 1876 and served as assistant vicar in Nilsiä and Kiuruvesi until 1892; he then served as vicar in Paavola and Lapua until 1921. He worked together with Mauno Rosendal and Juho Malkamäki as a leader of the awakening movement. Malmivaara and Malkamäki's work resulted in awakenings in many places in southern Ostrobothnia and the movement entered a new revival period. In 1914 the first folk high school associated with the Awakening started at Karhunmäki in Lapua.

He was a member of the synod of the Evangelical Lutheran Church of Finland in 1898, 1908, 1913 and 1918 and was also a representative of the clergy in the pre-independence Diet of Finland in 1897, 1899, 1900 and 1904–05 and a member of the Parliament of Finland, representing the Finnish Party from 1907 to 1918. He then represented the National Coalition Party from 1918 to 1920.

Malmivaara is a notable Finnish hymnwriter who renewed the hymnal of Finnish Awakening Siionin virret, which was translated in entirety into singable English verse in 2014 by Thomas McElwain. Seven of his texts are included in the hymnal and three of his texts are used in the hymnal of the Evangelical Lutheran Church of Finland. He also carried out the renewal of the hymnal originally composed by Finnish pastor and revivalist preacher Antti Achrenius. In 1888 Malmivaara founded the periodical of the Finnish Awakening, Hengellinen Kuukauslehti.

As a preacher, Malmivaara was equal to his father and had a particular capability to touch the hearts of his listeners. His sermons were published posthumously in a two-volume collection, Viestejä vaivatuille (1927–33), which remains one of the most remarkable achievements in Finland in the field of published sermon literature.

On the question of alcohol Malmivaara was an absolute prohibitionist and introduced that position into Finnish Awakening.

Malmivaara married Karin Rajander. The couple had many children, and several of their sons became pastors. Malmivaara died in Lapua, and his descendants are still represented in the Finnish clergy.

== Main works ==
- Kaita tie Joonaan kirjan valossa (1900)
- Puolivuosisataa heränneiden keskuudessa (1914)
- Elämän ääni (1954)
- The Songs of Zion: The Hymnal of the Awakened
