= Rymättylä =

Rymättylä Rymättylä – Rimito
- Former municipality
- Rymättylän kunta Rimito kommun
- Coat of arms

- Location of Rymättylä in Finland (2008).
- Interactive map of Rymättylä
- Location within Southwest Finland Location within Finland Location within Europe
- Country: Finland
- Province: Western Finland
- Region: Southwest Finland
- Sub-region: Turku
- Merged with Naantali: January 1, 2009

Government
  - City manager: Kauko Kangas

Area
  - Total: 150.11 km^{2} (57.96 sq mi)
  - Land: 146.45 km^{2} (56.54 sq mi)
  - Water: 3.66 km^{2} (1.41 sq mi)
  - Rank: 360th

Population (2003)
  - Total: 1,986
  - Rank: 350th
  - Density: 13.56/km^{2} (35.12/sq mi)
- +1.1 % change
- Time zone: UTC+2 (EET)
  - Summer (DST): UTC+3 (EEST)
- Official languages: Finnish
- Urbanisation: 37.8%
- Unemployment rate: 7.0%
- Website: http://www.rymattyla.fi/

Rymättylä (Finnish pronunciation: [ˈrymætːylæ]; Swedish: Rimito) is a former municipality of Finland. It was, together with Merimasku and Velkua, consolidated with the town of Naantali on January 1, 2009. Neighbouring municipalities of Rymättylä were Korpo, Merimasku, Naantali, Nagu, Pargas, Turku and Velkua.

It is located in the province of Western Finland and is part of the Southwest Finland region. Rymättylä was an island municipality, It consisted mainly of the southern part of Otava Island and also included some smaller islands in the Archipelago Sea.

The municipality had a population of 2,165 (2008-12-31) and covered an area of 150.11 km^{2} of which 3.66 km^{2} is water. The population density was 13.65 inhabitants per km^{2}.

The municipality was unilingually Finnish.
