= Stenberga Castle =

Medieval Finnish castle

Coordinates: 60°32′05″N 22°00′21″E

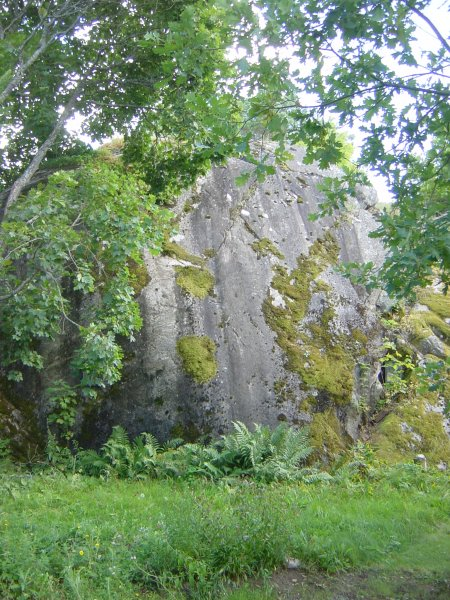
Stenberga Castle rock seen from the west

Stenberga Castle (also known as Teinperi) was a small medieval castle in Masku, Finland. It was originally built of gray stone, consisting of two towers with outer dimensions of 13 by 13 metres (43 by 43 ft) and 9 by 7 metres (30 by 23 ft), respectively. The castle walls were 2 metres (7 ft) thick. In a later phase, bricks were also used in the construction. The castle was on a steep rock, presumably an island back then, by the sea near the mouth of Hirvijoki River, flowing from Nousiainen. Due to the post-glacial rebound, the location is now almost 2 kilometres (1.2 mi) from the coastline. Very little remains of the castle.

Excavations have not been carried out on the site since the early 20th century, which has given room to dispute the castle's age. Some historians see it as a 14th-century construction, while others date it to the late 12th century, when King Canute built similar-looking small defensive castles in various parts of Sweden. According to more or less vague chronicles, Finland seems to have been under special military attention by Danish, Swedish and Russian forces in the 1190s, thus giving the possible context for the construction of the castle. Historian Ericus Olai claimed in the late 15th century that bishop Kol of Linköping (d. 1196?) had been the Duke of Finland (Dux Finlandiae), which however can not be confirmed from other sources. Also noteworthy is the castle's strategic position closing the maritime access to Nousiainen, which was the earliest presumed see of the Bishop of Finland. The see was moved to Koroinen latest in the mid-13th century.

Whatever the case, the castle itself is not mentioned in historical sources during the time when it was in operation. The Stenberga estate around it is first mentioned in 1398 as the property of the then bailiff of the Turku Castle. The estate was later donated to a Bridgettine monastery in Naantali in the 1430s. According to some historians, the abandoned castle was soon thereafter disassembled to get construction material for the monastery, which was only some ten kilometres away. In 1556, the estate, along with other property of the monastery, was confiscated to the state during the Reformation.

Today, the site is on private property, and has not been maintained for years. Land-owner's permission is required for a visit. The climb to the hilltop across steep rocks and bushes may be difficult.

== See also ==
- Hakoinen Castle
- Liinmaa Castle
- Old Castle of Lieto

== Gallery ==
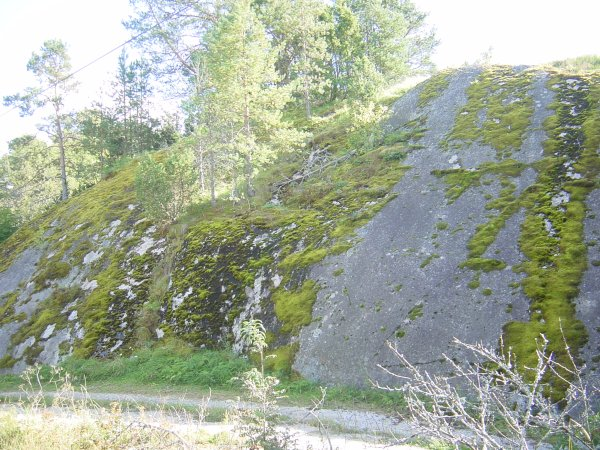
Steep slopes of the Stenberga Castle rock

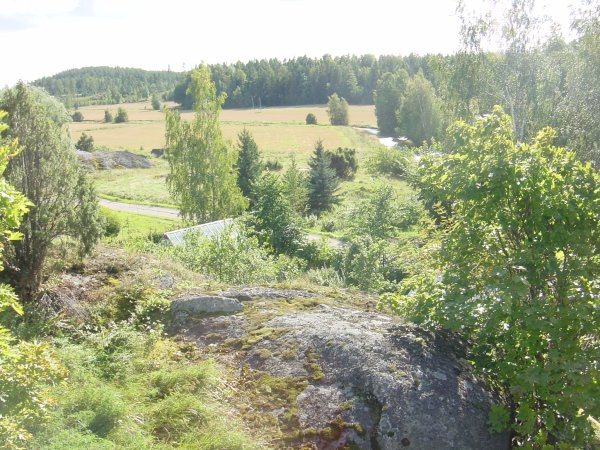
View from the castle rock

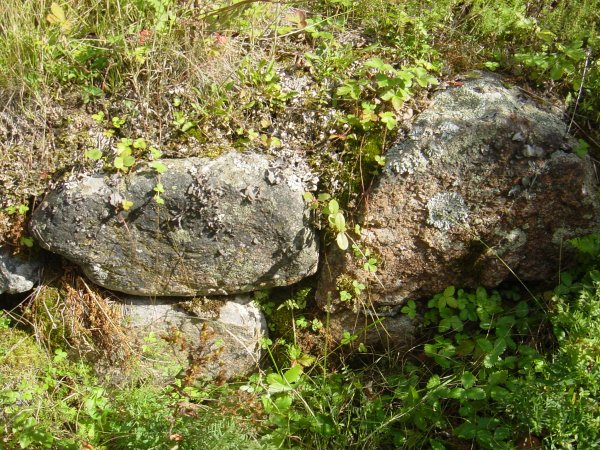
Some of the few remaining constructions on the castle rock
