= Lemu, Finland =

Coordinates: 60°34′10″N 21°58′05″E

Lemu Lemu – Lemo
- Former municipality
- Lemun kunta Lemo kommun
- Coat of arms

- Country: Finland
- Province: Western Finland
- Region: Southwest Finland
- Sub-region: Turku
- Merged into Masku: January 1, 2009

Government
  - City manager: Rauli Lumio

Area
  - Total: 47.25 km^{2} (18.24 sq mi)
  - Land: 47.14 km^{2} (18.20 sq mi)
  - Water: 0.11 km^{2} (0.042 sq mi)
  - Rank: 420th

Population (2003)
  - Total: 1,548
  - Rank: 378th
  - Density: 32.84/km^{2} (85.05/sq mi)
- +1.2 % change
- Time zone: UTC+2 (EET)
  - Summer (DST): UTC+3 (EEST)
- Official languages: Finnish
- Urbanisation: 63.2%
- Unemployment rate: 5.5%
- Website: http://www.lemu.fi/

Lemu (Finnish pronunciation: [ˈlemu]; Swedish: Lemo) is a former municipality of Finland and an old church parish dating to the Middle Ages. Together with Askainen, the municipality was consolidated with Masku on January 1, 2009.

It is located in the province of Western Finland and is part of the Southwest Finland region. The municipality had a population of 1,603 (2004-12-31) and covered an area of 47.25 km^{2} (18.24 sq mi) (excluding sea) of which 0.11 km^{2} (0.04 sq mi) is inland water. The population density was 34.01 inhabitants per km^{2} (88/sq mi).

The municipality was unilingually Finnish.

== See also ==
- Battle of Lemo
