= Siionin Virret =

Finnish hymnal

Siionin virret ("Hymns of Zion") is a hymnbook of the Finnish Awakening Christian revival movement (Herännäisyys). The hymnal is used in the traditional conventicle, or seurat, which is an informal religious gathering often taking place in homes. Hymns of Zion are also sung at the Awakening movement's summer festival, Herättäjäjuhlat.

Many of the hymns derive from the Swedish collection of songs Sions sånger from the 1740s, which was a hymnbook of the Swedish Moravian Church. It was translated into Finnish by parish minister Elias Lagus as Siionin virret, and its first edition was published in 1790. A new edition was produced by Wilhelmi Malmivaara in 1893 with 157 hymns. Jaakko Haavio edited the next revision, which was published in 1971. The current edition was revised in 2016 and adopted into use in 2017, and contains 255 hymns.

Other Finnish revival movements like Laestadians used the 1790 first edition of Siionin virret early in their history. The Prayer Movement still uses the original Elias Lagus translations in their hymnbook.

Wilhelmi Malmivaara's edition was translated in its entirety into English by Thomas McElwain and published under the title 'Songs of Zion' in 2014.
