= Raisio railway station =

Railway station in Raisio, Finland

Raisio Reso
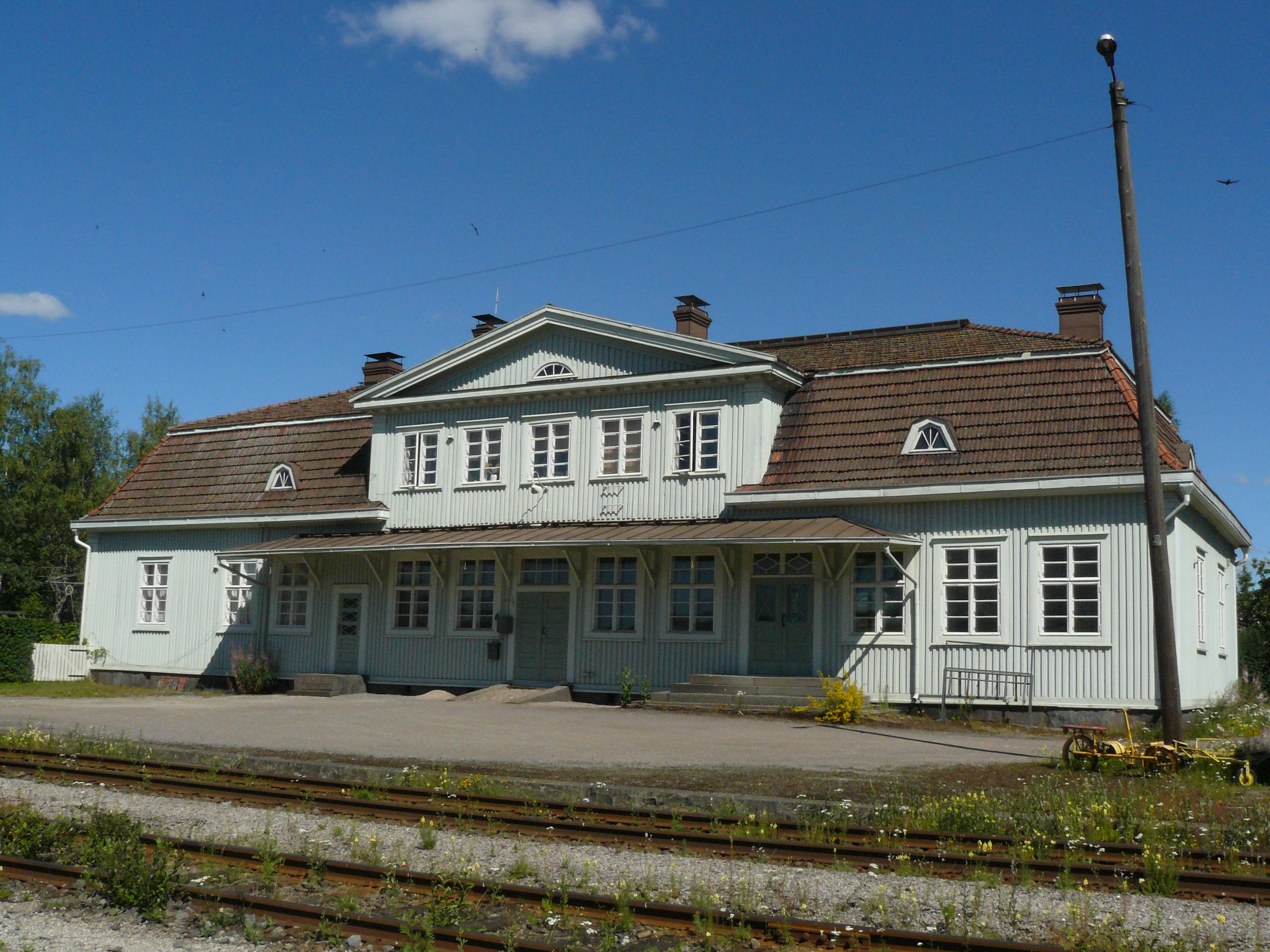

General information
- Location: Asematie, 21200; Raisio; Finland
- Coordinates: 60°29.15′N 022°07.74′E
- System: VR station
- Owner: Finnish Transport Infrastructure Agency
- Line: Turku–Uusikaupunki
- Train operators: VR Group

Other information
- Station code: Rai
- Classification: Operating point

History
- Opened: 1 September 1923
- Closed: 1 January 1993 (passenger services only)
Location

The Raisio railway station (Finnish: Raision rautatieasema, Swedish: Reso järnvägsstation) is a station located in the town of Raisio, Finland. It is located along the Turku–Uusikaupunki railway, and only serves freight transport; the nearest station with passenger services is Turku in the southwest.

The Finnish Heritage Agency has proclaimed the Raisio station as a built cultural environment of national significance.

== History ==
Raisio is one of the original stations of the Uusikaupunki railway, having been opened with the rest of the line on 1 September 1923; it was placed on the crossing point of the line with the road leading from Turku to Naantali. Raisio became a junction station upon the opening of the branch line leading to Naantali just over two months later, on 16 November 1923. Raisio was a class V station upon its opening, although it rose up to class III over time. The rail yard at the station originally had three tracks, as well as a warehouse siding.

The surroundings of the station began growing into an industrial center with the opening of the Oy Vehnä Ab mill. A siding to the mill was built in 1940, although it would not start operating until 1942. A brewery was opened nearby in 1949, and a vegetable oil factory followed in 1952. These three factories would go on to found the Raisio Group, then known as Raision Tehtaat, in 1957.

However, the railway did not directly influence the demographic development of the municipality of Raisio, as the surroundings of the church stayed as the geographical epicenter of its population growth. A zoning plan officialized by the municipal authorities on 1954 ordered the construction of a suburb closer to the center of the modern day town, effectively setting the stage for the geography of the municipality for years to come and relegating the Uusikaupunki line to exclusively serve freight transport. Raisio gained market town rights in 1966 and became a full town in 1974.

While ticket sales services at Raisio were ceased in 1988, and passenger services on the Uusikaupunki line were abolished altogether in 1993, Raisio remained a staffed station until the adoption of remote control on the line in the summer of 2008. The station building and its premises were transferred under the ownership of Senate Properties in 2007.

== Architecture ==
The station building in Raisio is representative of the architectural style on the Finnish railways in the 1920s. It was designed by I. Pladhan, and was completed in either 1925 or 1923. It had a three-room apartment for use by the stationmaster as well as a two-room one for use by the scribe, each of which also had a kitchen. The protected station area also includes a residential building. The Finnish Heritage Agency describes the station's location amongst the industrial buildings as highly representative of the significance that industry and railways present to each other.

== Services ==
Raisio was served by the passenger trains on the Uusikaupunki line until the cessation of these services in 1993. Although passenger services on the Naantali branch were abolished much earlier, in the first half of 1972, these trains did not typically call in Raisio, except for a single service running between Naantali and the Turku harbour in 1975.
