= Otava (island) =

Island in Finland

Coordinates: 60°23′N 21°53′E

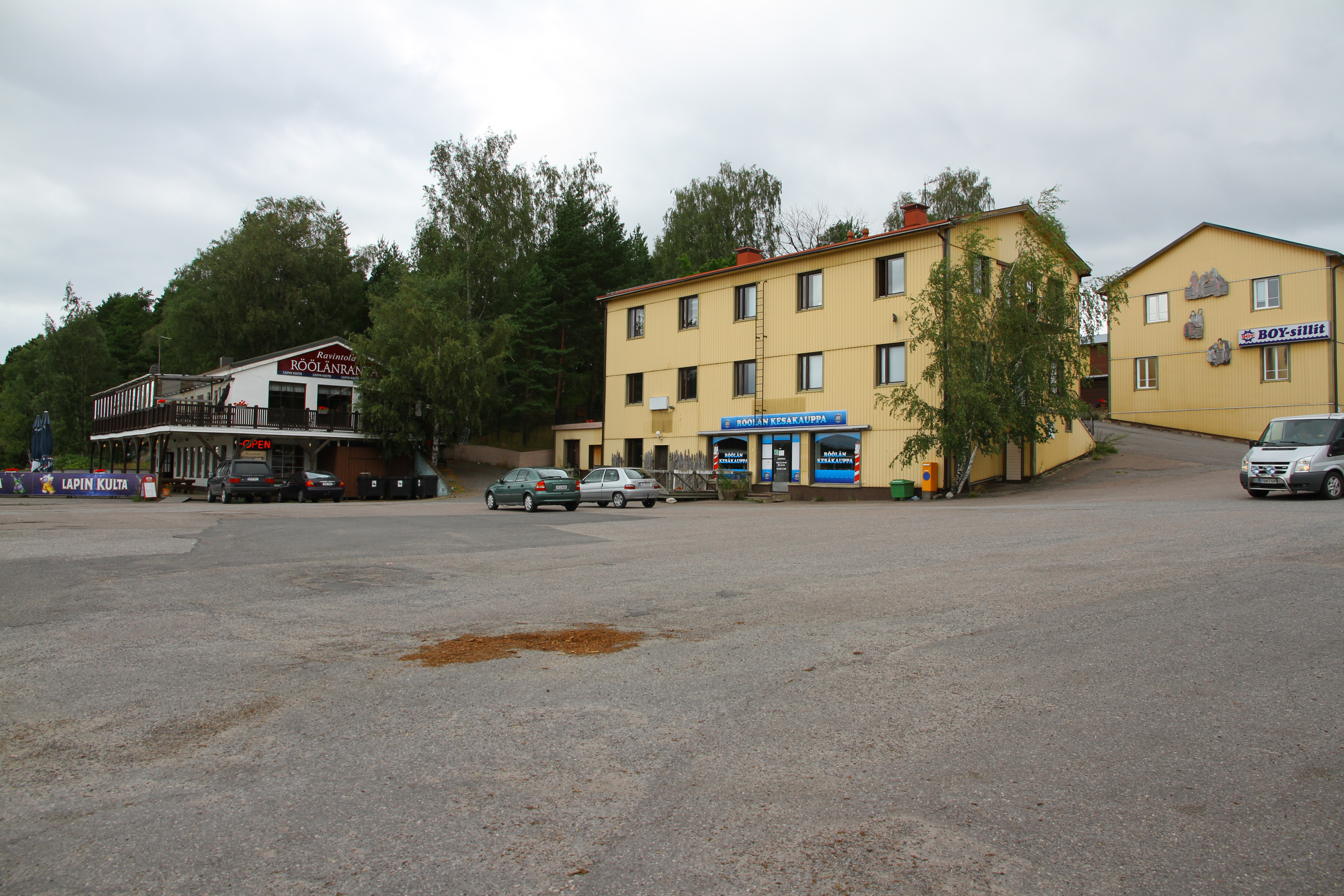
Röölä, a village on the Otava Island

Otava is an island in the Archipelago Sea, Finland. It is situated west of Naantali and has an area of 105 square kilometres (41 sq mi). It is the fifth largest maritime island in Finland.
