= Askainen =

Coordinates: 60°34′20″N 21°51′55″E

Askainen Askainen (Finnish) Villnäs (Swedish)
- Former municipality
- Askaisten kunta Villnäs kommun
- Coat of arms

- Country: Finland
- Province: Western Finland
- Region: Southwest Finland
- Sub-region: Turku
- Merged into Masku: January 1, 2009

Government
  - City manager: Pekka Määttänen

Area
  - Total: 61.52 km^{2} (23.75 sq mi)
  - Land: 61.26 km^{2} (23.65 sq mi)
  - Water: 0.26 km^{2} (0.10 sq mi)
  - Rank: 411th

Population (2003)
  - Total: 931
  - Rank: 414th
  - Density: 15.2/km^{2} (39.4/sq mi)
- +0.6% change
- Time zone: UTC+2 (EET)
  - Summer (DST): UTC+3 (EEST)
- Official languages: Finnish
- Urbanisation: 32.4%
- Unemployment rate: 8.4%
- Climate: Dfb
- Website: http://www.askainen.fi/

Askainen (Finnish: [ˈɑskɑi̯nen]; Swedish: Villnäs) is a former municipality of Finland. Together with Lemu, it was consolidated with Masku on January 1, 2009.

It is located in southwestern part of the country in the Varsinais-Suomi region. The municipality had a population of 938 (2004-12-31) and covered an area of 61.52 km^{2} (excluding sea) of which 0.26 km^{2} is inland water. The population density was 15.31 inhabitants per km^{2}.

The municipality was unilingually Finnish.

== History ==
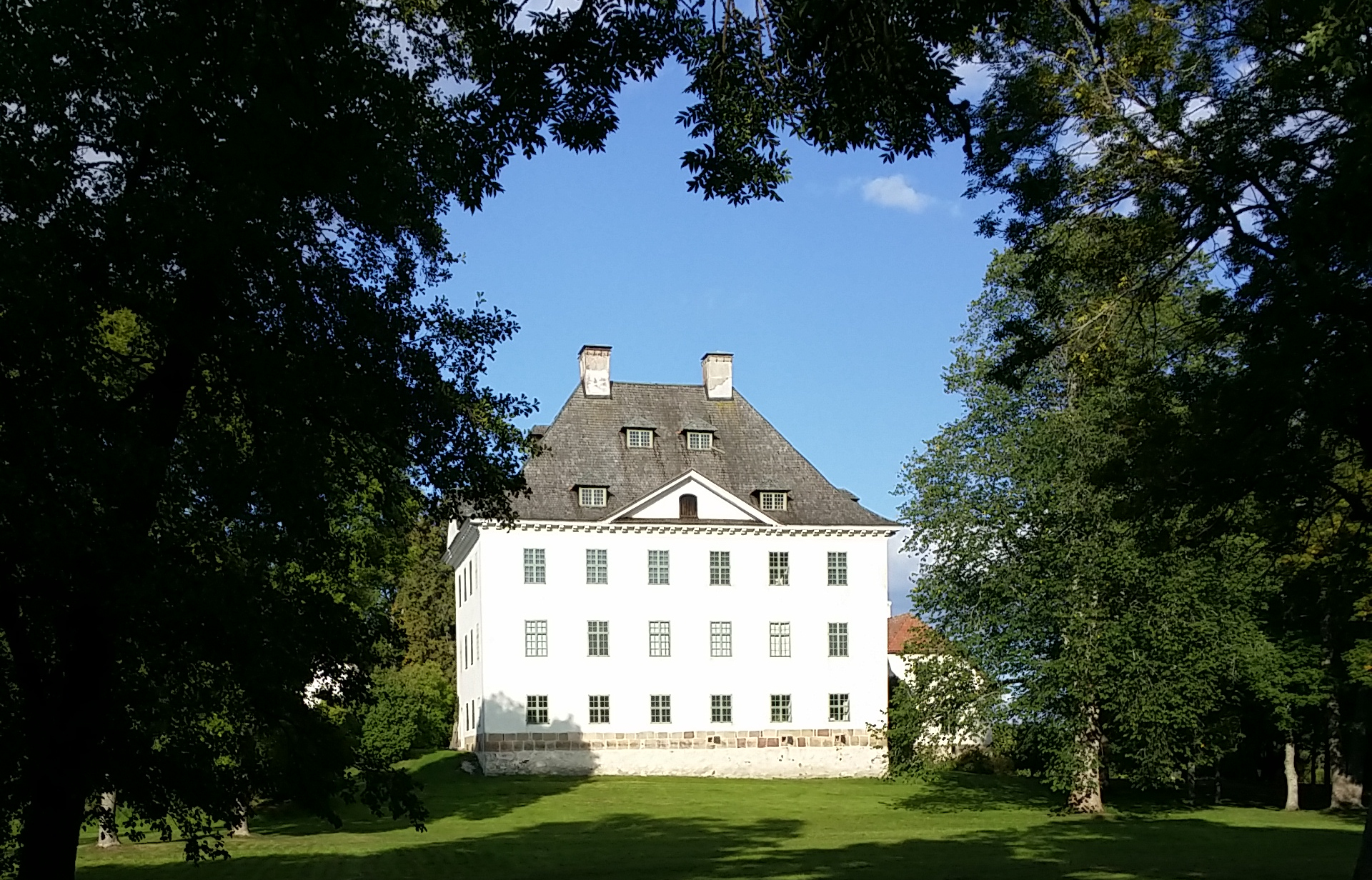
Louhisaari Manor in Askainen

Askainen was first mentioned in 1374 as Askais, when it was a part of the Nousiainen parish. It was included into the Lemu parish after its separation from Nousiainen sometime before 1404. Askainen was also held by the monastery of Naantali before the Reformation. Askainen was mentioned as a chapel community within Lemu in 1592, though chapel rights may have been granted earlier.

Askainen became a separate parish and municipality in 1910, but the parishes of Askainen and Lemu were reunited in 1960. Despite this, the two still acted as separate municipalities until 2009, when they became parts of Masku.

== Notable residents ==
- Carl Gustaf Emil Mannerheim, field marshal and 6th President of Finland was born in Askainen on June 4, 1867.
