= Juho Malkamäki =

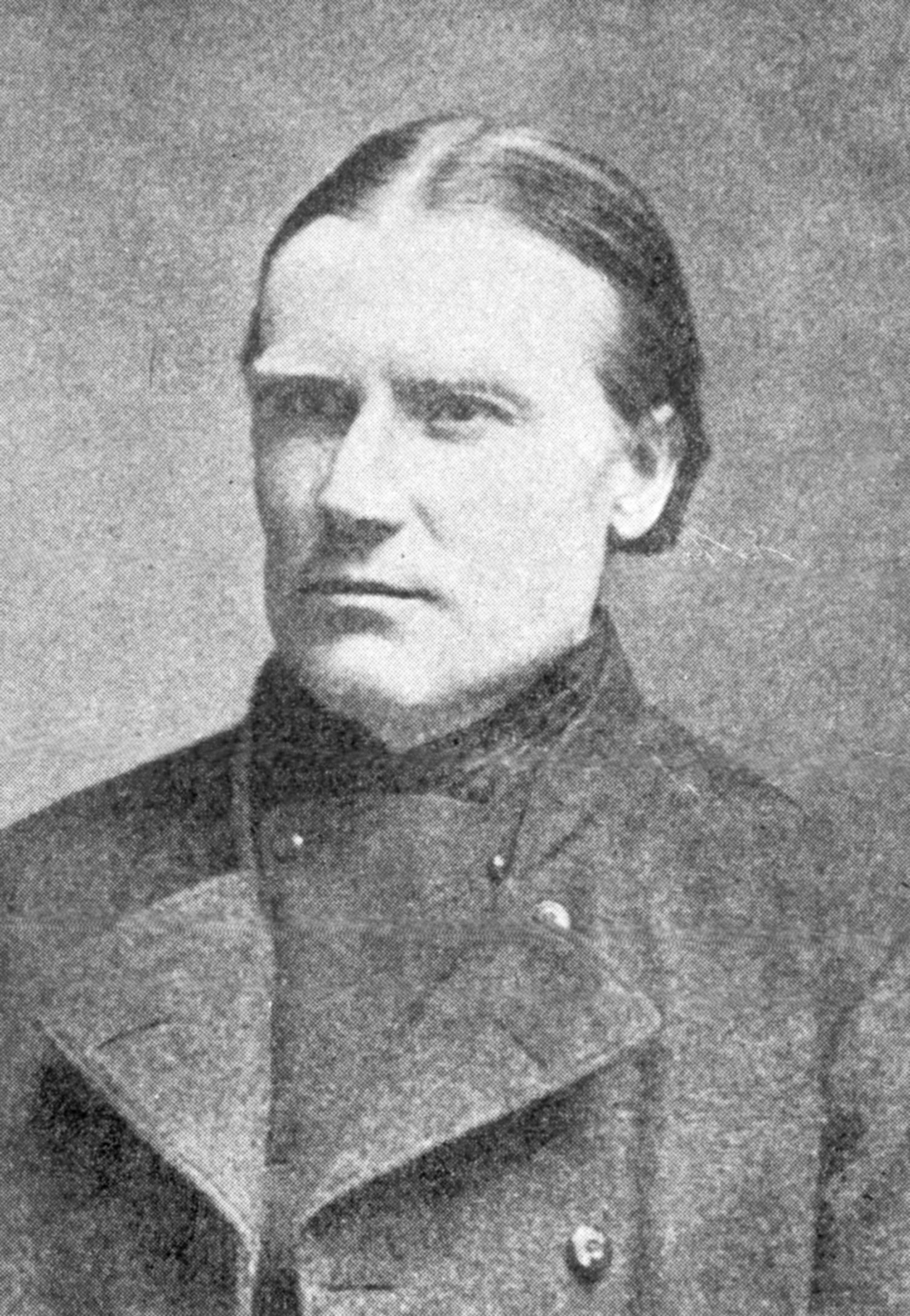
Juho Malkamäki

Juho Malkamäki (23 May 1844 – 13 January 1928) was a Finnish farmer, lay preacher and politician, born in Ylistaro. He was a member of the Diet of Finland in 1888 and of the Parliament of Finland from 1909 to 1911, representing the Finnish Party.

Malkamäki donated the land which was used for the Karhunmäki People's College; he was also a member of the board of the publishing company Herättäjä and the Board of the Evangelical Mission Society Herättäjä.

He was married three times and had eight children.
