= Jacobus Finno =

Finnish priest (c. 1540–1588)

Jacobus Petri Finno (circa 1540–1588), sometimes known as Jaakko Finno or by the Finnish form of his real name Jaakko Suomalainen (James the Finn), was a Finnish priest and the rector (headmaster) of the Cathedral School of Turku. He was the publisher of the first Finnish-language hymnal, as well as a catechism and a prayer book. Finno was doctrinally a moderate reformer.
