= Kemie, Tohmajärvi =

Kemie
- Village
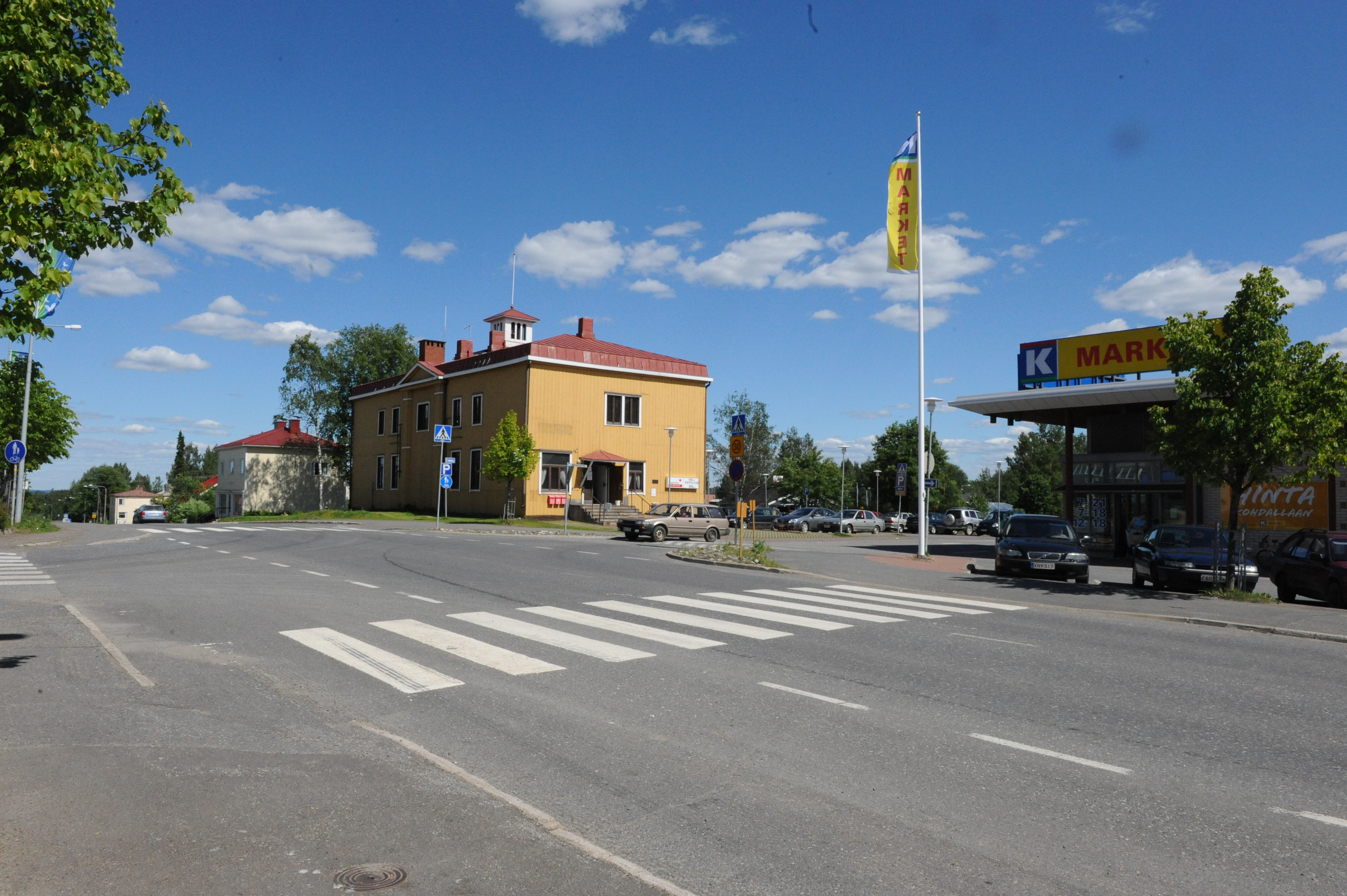
- Kemie's centre

- Location in Finland
- Coordinates: 62°13′30.46354″N 30°20′08.17447″E
- Country: Finland
- Region: North Karelia
- Municipality: Tohmajärvi

Area
  - Total: 4.68 km^{2} (1.81 sq mi)

Population (31 December 2020)
  - Total: 1,445
  - Density: 3,088/km^{2} (8,000/sq mi)
- Time zone: UTC+2 (EET)
  - Summer (DST): UTC+3 (EEST)
- Postal code: 82601

Kemie (also known as Tohmajärvi) is a village and administrative center of the Tohmajärvi municipality in North Karelia, Finland. At the end of 2020, the village had 1,445 inhabitants. It is located along the Highway 9, and like several North Karelian human settlements, Kemie has developed on top of a large, forested hill called vaara.

The Tohmajärvi Church is located at Kirkkoniemi on the northern shore of Lake Tohmajärvi, 5 kilometres (3.1 mi) southeast of the Kemie village.

== History ==
Kemie was first mentioned in 1618. The village name is derived from the nearby hill Kemienmäki, locally Kemmiimmäki, meaning "hill of meadows" (kemien is the plural genitive form of a dialectal word kemi). The name of Selkie in Kontiolahti has been formed similarly.
