= Värtsilä =

Värtsilä or Wärtsilä may refer to:

- Värtsilä, Finland, a former municipality
- Vyartsilya, an urban locality in Russia, formerly part of the Finnish municipality
- Wärtsilä, a neighbourhood in Järvenpää
- Wärtsilä or Wärtsilä Oyj Abp (Wärtsilä Corporation), a Finnish company in the marine and energy markets
