= 2026–27 Biathlon World Cup =

2026-27 Biathlon World Cup
Discipline	Men	Women
Overall	-	-
U23	-	-
Individual	-	-
Sprint	-	-
Pursuit	-	-
Mass start	-	-
Relay	-	-
Nations Cup	-	-
- Mixed: -

Competition
Edition	50th	45th
Locations	11	11
Individual	21	21

The 2026-27 Biathlon World Cup (official: LAVITA IBU World Cup Biathlon), organised by the International Biathlon Union, will be the 50th official World Cup season for men and 45th edition for the women.

The season will start on 26 November 2026 in Kontiolahti, Finland and will end on 21 March 2027 in Oslo Holmenkollen, Norway.

After one year break to World Championships due to the 2026 Winter Olympic Games, Otepää will be the host city of the 2027 Biathlon World Championships in this season. Just like the previous seasons, World Championships results will not be included in World Cup standings.

== Map of World Cup Hosts ==
(Finland) Kontiolahti	Location of all 11 World Cup hosts of the season (including Otepää – venue of the 2027 Biathlon World Championships)	(Italy) Antholz-Anterselva
(Austria) Hochfilzen	Location of all 11 World Cup hosts of the season (including Otepää – venue of the 2027 Biathlon World Championships)	(Czech Republic) Nové Město na Moravě
(France) Annecy-Le Grand-Bornand	Location of all 11 World Cup hosts of the season (including Otepää – venue of the 2027 Biathlon World Championships)	(Estonia) Otepää
(Slovenia) Pokljuka	Location of all 11 World Cup hosts of the season (including Otepää – venue of the 2027 Biathlon World Championships)	(Germany) Oberhof
(Germany) Ruhpolding	Location of all 11 World Cup hosts of the season (including Otepää – venue of the 2027 Biathlon World Championships)	(Sweden) Östersund
(Norway) Oslo Holmenkollen

== Calendar ==
Stage	Location	Date	Individual/ Short individual	Sprint	Pursuit	Mass start	Relay	Mixed relay	Single mixed relay	Details
1	(Finland) Kontiolahti	24–29 November	●	●				●	●	details
2	(Austria) Hochfilzen	1–6 December		●	●		●			details
3	(France) Annecy–Le Grand-Bornand	8–13 December		●	●	●				details
4	(Slovenia) Pokljuka	31 December–3 January		●			●			details
5	(Germany) Ruhpolding	5–10 January		●	●		●			details
6	(Italy) Antholz-Anterselva	12–17 January	●			●		●	●	details
7	(Czech Republic) Nové Město na Moravě	19–24 January		●		●	●			details
WCH	(Estonia) Otepää	8–21 February	●	●	●	●	●	●	●	World Championships
8	(Germany) Oberhof	2–7 March		●	●		●			details
9	(Sweden) Östersund	9–14 March	●			●		●	●	details
10	(Norway) Oslo Holmenkollen	16–21 March		●	●	●				details

== Men ==
=== Calendar ===
Key: IND – Individual / SPR – Sprint / PUR – Pursuit / MSS – Mass Start
No.	Date	Place (In brackets Stage)	Discipline	Winner	Second	Third	R.
1	26 November 2026	(Finland) Kontiolahti (1)	20 km IND				
2	29 November 2026	(Finland) Kontiolahti (1)	10 km SPR				
3	4 December 2026	(Austria) Hochfilzen (2)	10 km SPR				
4	5 December 2026	(Austria) Hochfilzen (2)	12.5 km PUR				
5	11 December 2026	(France) Annecy–Le Grand-Bornand (3)	10 km SPR				
6	12 December 2026	(France) Annecy–Le Grand-Bornand (3)	12.5 km PUR				
7	13 December 2026	(France) Annecy–Le Grand-Bornand (3)	15 km MSS				
8	2 January 2027	(Slovenia) Pokljuka (4)	10 km SPR				
9	9 January 2027	(Germany) Ruhpolding (5)	10 km SPR				
10	10 January 2027	(Germany) Ruhpolding (5)	12.5 km PUR				
11	14 January 2027	(Italy) Antholz-Anterselva (6)	20 km IND				
12	17 January 2027	(Italy) Antholz-Anterselva (6)	15 km MSS				
13	22 January 2027	(Czech Republic) Nové Město na Moravě (7)	10 km SPR				
14	24 January 2027	(Czech Republic) Nové Město na Moravě (7)	15 km MSS				
Biathlon World Championships 2027 (10–21 February) (Note: Biathlon World Championships are included in the World Cup calendar, but their results do not contribute to the overall World Cup standings, with the exception of the Nations Cup.)
—	12 February 2027	(Estonia) Otepää (WCH)	10 km SPR	1st place, gold medalist(s)	2nd place, silver medalist(s)	3rd place, bronze medalist(s)	
—	14 February 2027	(Estonia) Otepää (WCH)	12.5 km PUR	1st place, gold medalist(s)	2nd place, silver medalist(s)	3rd place, bronze medalist(s)	
—	17 February 2027	(Estonia) Otepää (WCH)	20 km IND	1st place, gold medalist(s)	2nd place, silver medalist(s)	3rd place, bronze medalist(s)	
—	21 February 2025	(Estonia) Otepää (WCH)	15 km MSS	1st place, gold medalist(s)	2nd place, silver medalist(s)	3rd place, bronze medalist(s)	
15	4 March 2027	(Germany) Oberhof (8)	10 km SPR				
16	6 March 2027	(Germany) Oberhof (8)	12.5 km PUR				
17	12 March 2027	(Sweden) Östersund (9)	20 km IND				
18	14 March 2027	(Sweden) Östersund (9)	15 km MSS				
19	18 March 2027	(Norway) Oslo Holmenkollen (10)	10 km SPR				
20	20 March 2027	(Norway) Oslo Holmenkollen (10)	12.5 km PUR				
21	21 March 2027	(Norway) Oslo Holmenkollen (10)	15 km MSS				
49th Biathlon World Cup Overall (26 November 2026 – 21 March 2027)							

=== Relay – 4 x 7.5 km ===
No.	Date	Place (In brackets Stage)	Winner	Second	Third	Leader (After competition)	R.
1	6 December 2026	(Austria) Hochfilzen (1)					
2	3 January 2027	(Slovenia) Pokljuka (2)					
3	7 January 2027	(Germany) Ruhpolding (3)					
4	23 January 2027	(Czech Republic) Nové Město na Moravě (4)					
—	19 February 2027	(Estonia) Otepää (WCH)	1st place, gold medalist(s)	2nd place, silver medalist(s)	3rd place, bronze medalist(s)	not included in the World Cup	
5	7 March 2027	(Germany) Oberhof (5)					

=== Overall leaders ===
Holder	Date	Place(s)	Number of competitions
Individual
	26 November 2026	(Finland) Kontiolahti	1
Under 23
	26 November 2026	(Finland) Kontiolahti	1

=== Standings ===
==== Overall ====
Rank	standings after 0 of 21 events	Points
1
2
3
4
5
6
7
8
9
10

==== Under 23 ====
Rank	standings after 0 of 21 events	Points
1
2
3
4
5
6
7
8
9
10

==== Individual ====
Rank	standings after 0 of 3 events	Points
1
2
3
4
5
6
7
8
9
10

==== Sprint ====
Rank	standings after 0 of 8 events	Points
1
2
3
4
5
6
7
8
9
10

==== Pursuit ====
Rank	standings after 0 of 5 events	Points
1
2
3
4
5
6
7
8
9
10

==== Mass start ====
Rank	standings after 0 of 5 events	Points
1
2
3
4
5
6
7
8
9
10

==== Relay ====
Rank	standings after 0 of 5 events	Points
1
2
3
4
5
6
7
8
9
10

==== Nations Cup ====
Rank	standings after 0 of 21 events	Points
1
2
3
4
5
6
7
8
9
10

== Women ==
=== Calendar ===
Key: IND – Individual / SPR – Sprint / PUR – Pursuit / MSS – Mass Start
No.	Date	Place (In brackets Stage)	Discipline	Winner	Second	Third	R.
1	27 November 2026	(Finland) Kontiolahti (1)	15 km IND				
2	29 November 2026	(Finland) Kontiolahti (1)	7.5 km SPR				
3	4 December 2026	(Austria) Hochfilzen (2)	7.5 km SPR				
4	5 December 2026	(Austria) Hochfilzen (2)	10 km PUR				
5	10 December 2026	(France) Annecy–Le Grand-Bornand (3)	7.5 km SPR				
6	12 December 2026	(France) Annecy–Le Grand-Bornand (3)	10 km PUR				
7	13 December 2026	(France) Annecy–Le Grand-Bornand (3)	12.5 km MSS				
8	2 January 2027	(Slovenia) Pokljuka (4)	7.5 km SPR				
9	8 January 2027	(Germany) Ruhpolding (5)	7.5 km SPR				
10	10 January 2027	(Germany) Ruhpolding (5)	10 km PUR				
11	15 January 2027	(Italy) Antholz-Anterselva (6)	15 km IND				
12	17 January 2027	(Italy) Antholz-Anterselva (6)	12.5 km MSS				
13	21 January 2027	(Czech Republic) Nové Město na Moravě (7)	7.5 km SPR				
14	23 January 2027	(Czech Republic) Nové Město na Moravě (7)	12.5 km MSS				
Biathlon World Championships 2027 (10–21 February)
—	13 February 2027	(Estonia) Otepää (WCH)	7.5 km SPR	1st place, gold medalist(s)	2nd place, silver medalist(s)	3rd place, bronze medalist(s)	
—	14 February 2027	(Estonia) Otepää (WCH)	10 km PUR	1st place, gold medalist(s)	2nd place, silver medalist(s)	3rd place, bronze medalist(s)	
—	18 February 2027	(Estonia) Otepää (WCH)	15 km IND	1st place, gold medalist(s)	2nd place, silver medalist(s)	3rd place, bronze medalist(s)	
—	21 February 2025	(Estonia) Otepää (WCH)	12.5 km MSS	1st place, gold medalist(s)	2nd place, silver medalist(s)	3rd place, bronze medalist(s)	
15	5 March 2027	(Germany) Oberhof (8)	7.5 km SPR				
16	6 March 2027	(Germany) Oberhof (8)	10 km PUR				
17	11 March 2027	(Sweden) Östersund (9)	15 km IND				
18	14 March 2027	(Sweden) Östersund (9)	12.5 km MSS				
19	19 March 2027	(Norway) Oslo Holmenkollen (10)	7.5 km SPR				
20	20 March 2027	(Norway) Oslo Holmenkollen (10)	10 km PUR				
21	21 March 2027	(Norway) Oslo Holmenkollen (10)	12.5 km MSS				
49th Biathlon World Cup Overall (26 November 2026 – 21 March 2027)							

=== Relay – 4 x 6 km ===
No.	Date	Place (In brackets Stage)	Winner	Second	Third	Leader (After competition)	R.
1	6 December 2026	(Austria) Hochfilzen (1)					
2	3 January 2027	(Slovenia) Pokljuka (2)					
3	6 January 2027	(Germany) Ruhpolding (3)					
4	24 January 2027	(Czech Republic) Nové Město na Moravě (4)					
—	20 February 2027	(Estonia) Otepää (WCH)	1st place, gold medalist(s)	2nd place, silver medalist(s)	3rd place, bronze medalist(s)	not included in the World Cup	
5	7 March 2027	(Germany) Oberhof (5)					

=== Overall leaders ===
Holder	Date	Place(s)	Number of competitions
Individual
	27 November 2026	(Finland) Kontiolahti	1
Under 23
	27 November 2026	(Finland) Kontiolahti	1

=== Standings ===
==== Overall ====
Rank	standings after 0 of 21 events	Points
1
2
3
4
5
6
7
8
9
10

==== Under 23 ====
Rank	standings after 0 of 21 events	Points
1
2
3
4
5
6
7
8
9
10

==== Individual ====
Rank	standings after 0 of 3 events	Points
1
2
3
4
5
6
7
8
9
10

==== Sprint ====
Rank	standings after 0 of 8 events	Points
1
2
3
4
5
6
7
8
9
10

==== Pursuit ====
Rank	standings after 0 of 5 events	Points
1
2
3
4
5
6
7
8
9
10

==== Mass start ====
Rank	standings after 0 of 5 events	Points
1
2
3
4
5
6
7
8
9
10

==== Relay ====
Rank	standings after 0 of 5 events	Points
1
2
3
4
5
6
7
8
9
10

==== Nations Cup ====
Rank	standings after 0 of 21 events	Points
1
2
3
4
5
6
7
8
9
10

== Mixed Relay ==
No.	Date	Place (In brackets Stage)	Winner	Second	Third	Leader (After competition)	R.
Single Mixed Relay – 6 km + 7.5 km
1	28 November 2026	(Finland) Kontiolahti (1)					
3	16 January 2027	(Italy) Antholz-Anterselva (6)					
—	16 February 2027	(Estonia) Otepää (WCH)	1st place, gold medalist(s)	2nd place, silver medalist(s)	3rd place, bronze medalist(s)	not included in the World Cup	
5	13 March 2027	(Sweden) Östersund (9)					
Mixed Relay – 4 x 6 km
2	28 November 2027	(Finland) Kontiolahti (1)					
4	16 January 2027	(Italy) Antholz-Anterselva (6)					
—	10 February 2027	(Estonia) Otepää (WCH)	1st place, gold medalist(s)	2nd place, silver medalist(s)	3rd place, bronze medalist(s)	not included in the World Cup	
6	13 March 2026	(Sweden) Östersund (9)					

=== Standings ===
Rank	standings after 0 of 6 events	Points
2
3
4
5
6
7
8
9
10

== Podium table by nation ==
Table showing the World Cup podium places (gold–1st place, silver–2nd place, bronze–3rd place) by the countries represented by the athletes.

standings after 0 of 58 competitions.

Rank	Nation	Gold	Silver	Bronze	Total
Totals (0 entries)		0	0	0	0

== Achievements ==
First World Cup career victory

Men

Women

First World Cup podium

Men

Women

Number of wins this season (in brackets are all-time wins)

Men

Women

== Retirements ==
The following notable biathletes, who competed in the World Cup, retired during or after the 2026–27 season:

Men

Women

== See also ==
- 2026–27 Biathlon IBU Cup (as the second highest competition series of IBU).
- 2027 Biathlon World Championships
- 2027 IBU Open European Championships
- 2027 IBU Junior Open European Championships
- Biathlon Junior World Championships 2027
