= Hoilola =

Village in North Karelia, Finland

- Village
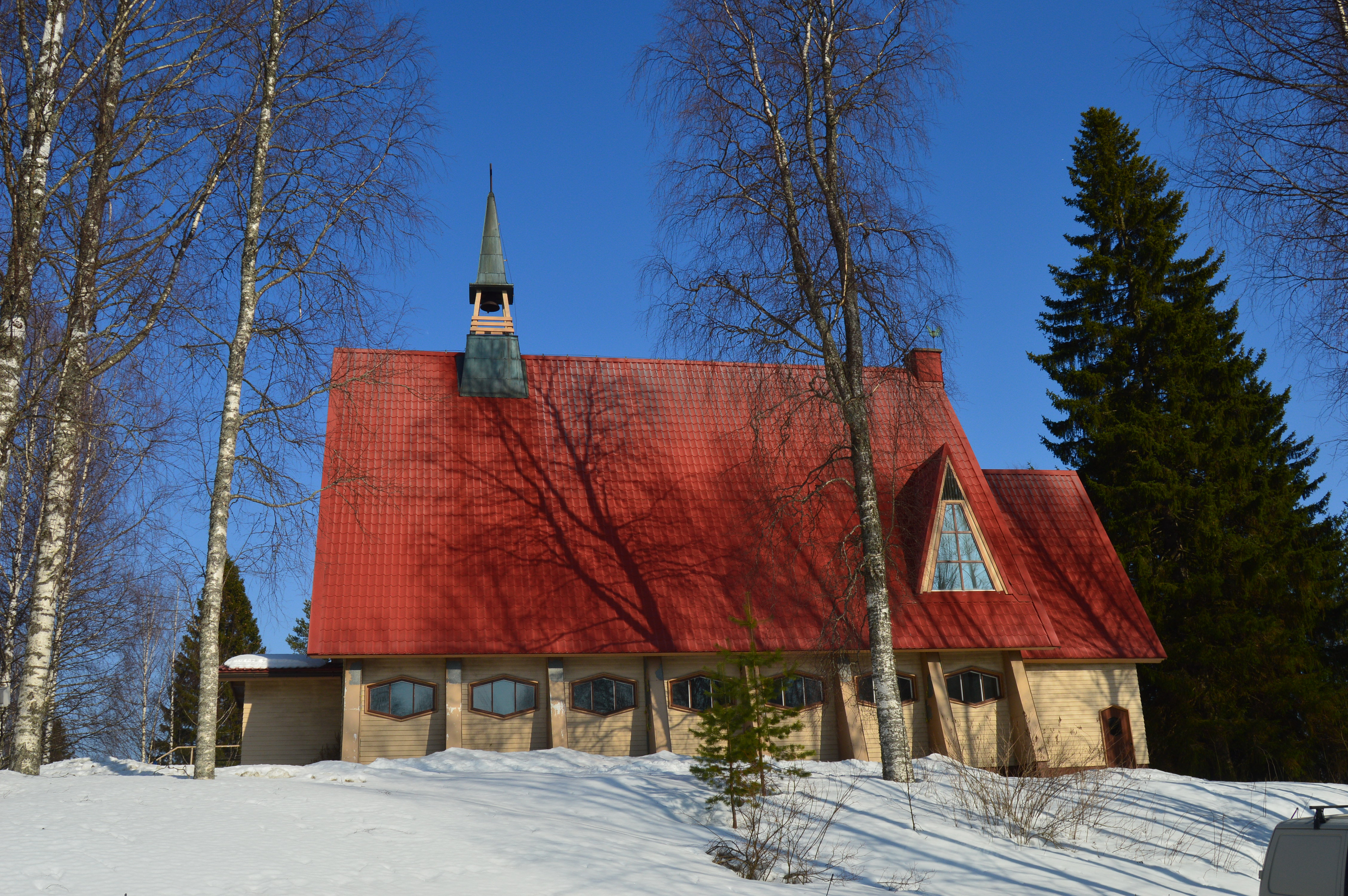
- Hoilola Lutheran Church

- Location in Finland Hoilola (Finland)
- Coordinates: 62°20.5′N 30°50.2′E
- Country: Finland
- Region: North Karelia
- Municipality: Joensuu
- Time zone: UTC+2 (EET)
  - Summer (DST): UTC+3 (EEST)
- Postal code: 82760

Hoilola (Finnish pronunciation: [ˈhoi̯lolɑ]) is a village in North Karelia, Finland. It is located near the Russian border along the regional road 500 about 68 kilometres (42 mi) southeast of the city centre of Joensuu.

Before World War II, Hoilola was part of the Korpiselkä municipality, which was ceded to the Soviet Union in the territorial cessions. Hoilola is one of the villages that remained entirely on the Finnish side. After this, the village became part of Tuupovaara municipality until 2005, when the areas were annexed to Joensuu.

The village is known for its two churches: one Lutheran from 1949 and one Orthodox from 1957.

== See also ==
- Öllölä
