= Mönni =

Village in Kontiolahti, Finland

Coordinates: 62.69695°N 30.10526°E

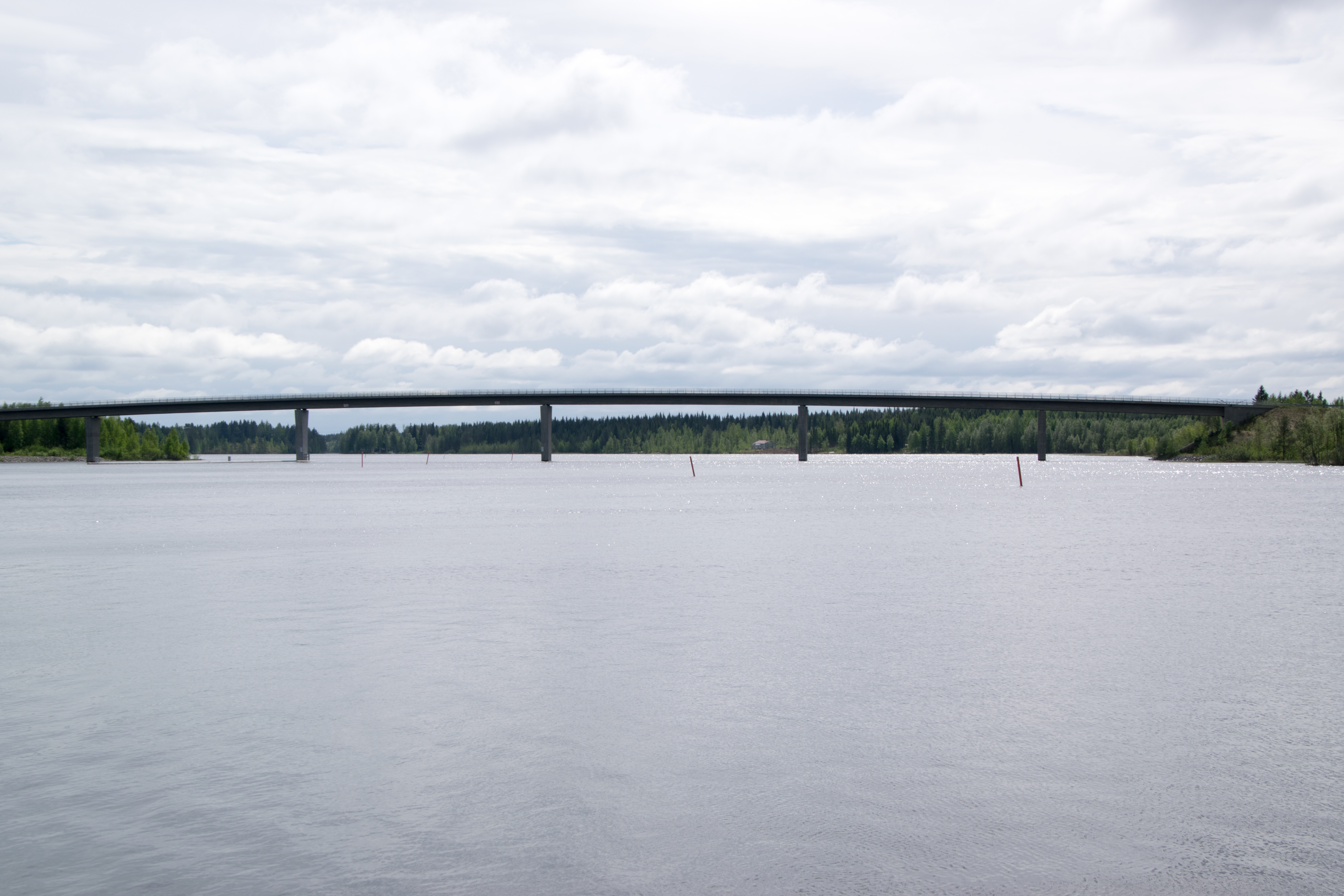
The Mönni Bridge (Mönnin silta) on the Pielinen River

Mönni is a village in the eastern part of Kontiolahti in North Karelia, Finland. The village is home to about 200 people. The settlement of the village is located along the roads belonging to its hilly landscape. Some of the houses can be found at the end of the rolling areas framed by arable land. The scenic road leads from hill to another. On the western edge of the village flows the Pielinen River, over which the 35000-meter Mönni Bridge of the highway 5100 leads. By road, passing through the Mönni Bridge, there are more than 17 kilometers from the village to the center of Kontiolahti and about 30 kilometers to the center of Joensuu.

The village of Mönni is named after its resident Jaakko Mönninen (Jakob Mönnin), who lived there in 1614 according to the Kexholm County's land register. In 1631, he had already moved to the village of Paihola. Mönni is originally a circular expression for a bear, such as kontio and the mesikämmen. Mönni, like several other animal names, has also become a surname in Karelia.

In the middle of the village is an old school that serves as a village house. Mönni has a village association since 1979. Sports and wilderness clubs are Mönnin Veto and Mönnin Erä.
