= Kangasvesi =

- Location within Finland
- Location: Kontiolahti
- Coordinates: 62°41′28″N 30°03′22″E
- Type: Lake
- Primary inflows: Leppävirta river
- Primary outflows: Pielisjoki
- Catchment area: Vuoksi
- Basin countries: Finland
- Surface area: 13.725 km^{2} (5.299 sq mi)
- Shore length^{1}: 65.27 km (40.56 mi)
- Surface elevation: 83.8 m (275 ft)
- Frozen: December–April
- Islands: Ruotinsaari, Pitkäniemi
- ^{1} Shore length is not a well-defined measure.

Kangasvesi is a medium-sized lake in Finland, in the Vuoksi main catchment area. It is located in the North Karelia region, in the municipality of Kontiolahti.

== See also ==
- List of lakes in Finland
