= Puhakka =

Puhakka is a Finnish surname. Notable people with the surname include:

- Antti Puhakka (1816–1893), Finnish romantic poet
- Joona Puhakka (born 1982), Finnish diver
- Mirja Puhakka (fl. 1980–1984), Finnish ski-orienteering competitor
- Olli Puhakka (1916–1989), Finnish Air Force ace
- Osmo Puhakka (born 1948), Finnish Lutheran clergyman and politician
