= Öllölä =

Village in North Karelia, Finland

Coordinates: 62°23′N 30°45′E

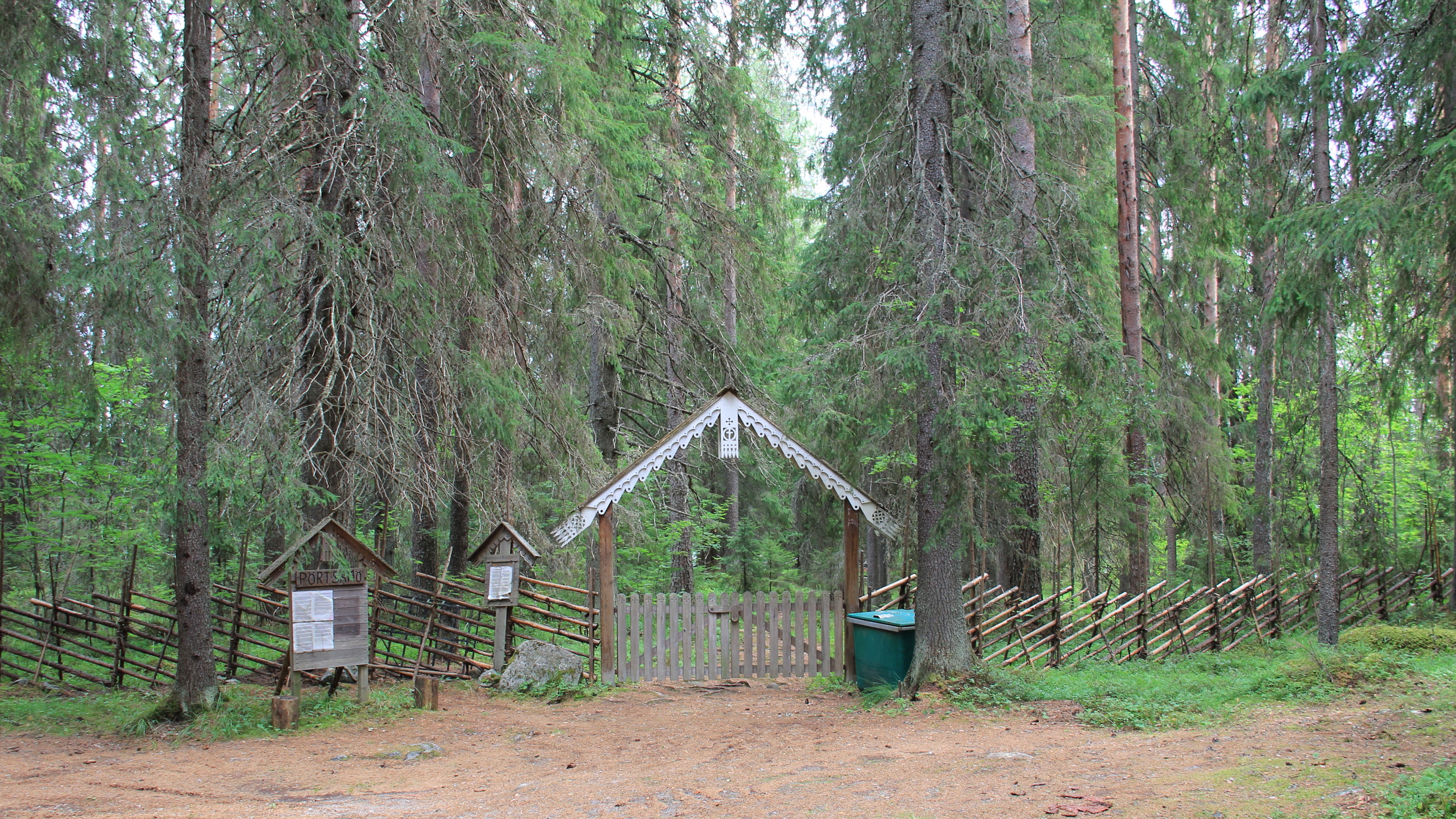
Entrance of Pörtsämö orthodox wilderness cemetery in Öllölä

Öllölä (Finnish pronunciation: [ˈølːølæ]) is a village in Joensuu, Finland. The village is located in the former municipality of Tuupovaara, which has been consolidated into Joensuu. Öllölä was selected Finland's village of the year in 1994. In Öllölä there is a shop and a school, which offers lodging and eating.

The earliest records of the village date back to 1637.

== See also ==
- Hoilola
