= Tohmajärvi Church =

- Finnish: Tohmajärven kirkko
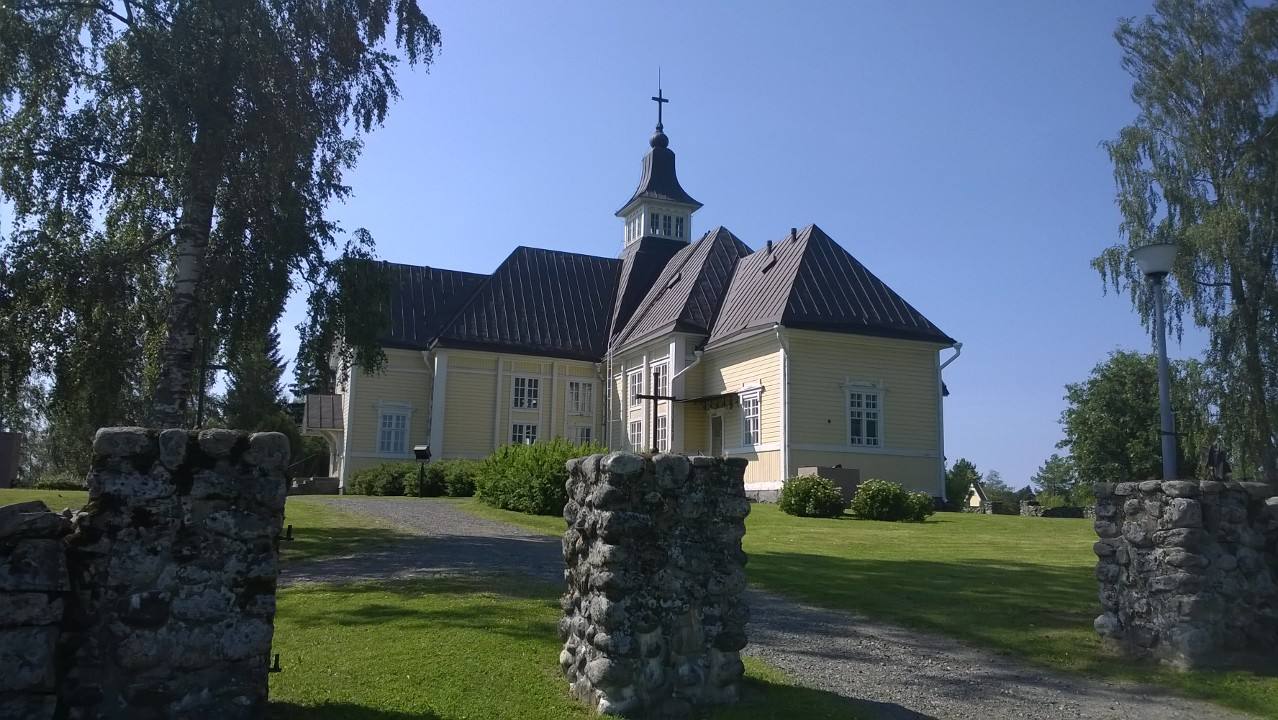
- Tohmajärvi Church
- 62°11′28.7″N 30°23′00.6″E
- Location: Tohmajärvi, North Karelia
- Country: Finland
- Website: www.tohmajarvenseurakunta.fi

Architecture
- Architect: Eskil Collenius
- Completed: 1756

Specifications
- Capacity: about 650

Administration
- Diocese: Kuopio
- Parish: Tohmajärvi

The Tohmajärvi Church (Finnish: Tohmajärven kirkko) is the 18th-century wooden church located on the shores of Lake Tohmajärvi, about 6 kilometres (3.7 mi) southeast of Kemie, the administrative center of the Tohmajärvi municipality in North Karelia, Finland. The building is the oldest wooden church in North Karelia.

== History ==
The construction of the church started in 1751 under the direction of the architect Eskil Collenius and it was completed five years later. A separate three-jointed belfry was built in 1760. The altarpiece of the church called The Crucified was painted by Mikael Toppelius in 1783.

The church's 17+2 tone pipe organ was manufactured by the Kangasala's organ factory in 1956.
