= Karelia University of Applied Sciences =

Institute of higher education in Joensuu, Finland

- Karelia-ammattikorkeakoulu
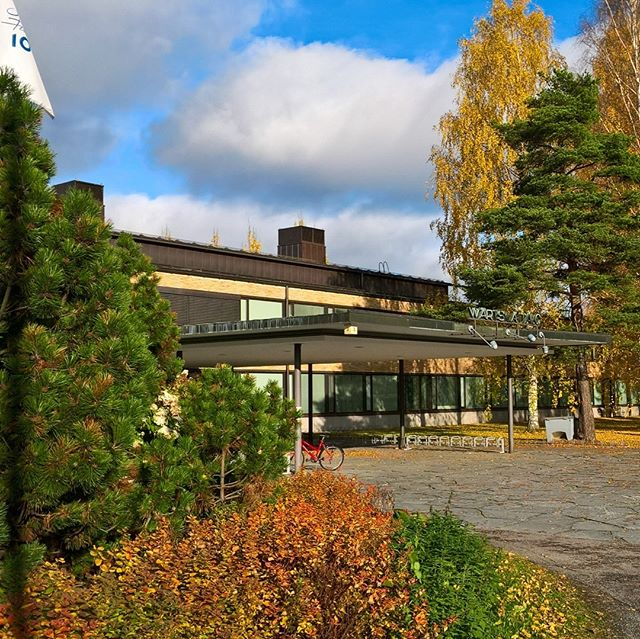
- Established: 1992
- Rector: Petri Raivo
- Academic staff: 450
- Students: 4000
- Location: Joensuu, Finland
- Website: http://www.karelia.fi/
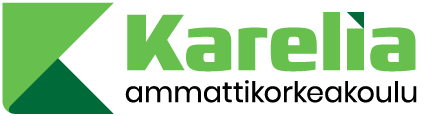

Karelia University of Applied Sciences (Finnish: Karelia-ammattikorkeakoulu), until 2013 North Karelia University of Applied Sciences, is an institution of higher education and applied research located in Joensuu, Finland. It has about 4000 students and 450 staff members. It offers 18 different degree programs.
