= Vyartsilya =

Vyartsilya Вяртсиля
- Urban-type settlement
- Interactive map of Vyartsilya
- Location of Vyartsilya Vyartsilya (Karelia)
- Coordinates: 62°11′N 30°42′E
- Country: Russia
- Federal subject: Republic of Karelia
- Urban-type settlement status since: 1946
- Elevation: 101 m (331 ft)

Population (2010 Census)
  - Total: 3,080
  - Estimate (2023): 2,086 (−32.3%)

Administrative status
  - Subordinated to: town of republic significance of Sortavala

Municipal status
  - Municipal district: Sortavalsky Municipal District
  - Urban settlement: Vyartsilskoye Urban Settlement
  - Capital of: Vyartsilskoye Urban Settlement
- Time zone: UTC+3 (UTC+03:00)
- Postal code: 186757
- OKTMO ID: 86610160051

Vyartsilya (Russian: Вя́ртсиля; Finnish: Värtsilä) is an urban locality (an urban-type settlement) under the administrative jurisdiction of the town of republic significance of Sortavala in the Republic of Karelia, Russia, located near the border with Finland, 256 kilometers (159 mi) west of Petrozavodsk, the capital of the republic. As of the 2010 Census, its population was 3,080.

== History ==
An ancient settlement existed in the area of the present settlement as early as the first millennium BC. Its traces were found in 1935 by the Finnish archaeologist Sakari Pälsi.

Vyartsilya was first mentioned in the salary books for 1499–1500 years, the village then numbered three courtyards and was part of the Vodskaya Pyatina of Novgorod Land.

In 1617, according to the Stolbovsky Treaty, the territory on which Vyartsilya was located was transferred by Russia to Sweden.

Later, the settlement became part of the Grand Duchy of Finland of the Russian Empire. In 1834, a small sawmill was built. In 1851, a metallurgical plant was built in Vyartsilya on the site of a sawmill for melting lake and swamp iron ore (it works to this day, but cast iron and steel smelting is no longer produced). The Finnish engineering company Wärtsilä traces its history back to the creation of these enterprises.

Since 1918, it has been part of independent Finland.

During the Soviet-Finnish War of 1939-1940, the village suffered greatly.

Vyartsilya became part of the Karelo-Finnish SSR of the USSR under the terms of the Moscow Treaty of 1940.

Urban-type settlement status was granted to it in 1946.

== Administrative and municipal status ==
Within the framework of administrative divisions, the urban-type settlement of Vyartsilya is subordinated to the town of republic significance of Sortavala. As a municipal division, Vyartsilya is incorporated within Sortavalsky Municipal District as Vyartsilskoye Urban Settlement.

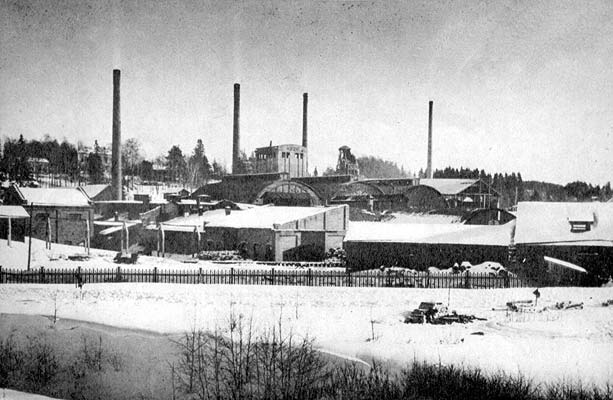
The factory in Vyartsilya. Photo circa 1930

== Border crossing ==
Vyartsilya is a major border checkpoint on the Finnish–Russian border (to Niirala in Tohmajärvi), with about one million people crossing the border annually. It is said that during the Cold War, from time to time, exchanges of captured spies occurred there.

== Economy ==
By the Decree of the Government of the Russian Federation dated 29.07.2014 No. 1398-r (ed. dated 24.11.2015) «On approval of the list of monotowns», it is included in the list of single-industry municipalities of the Russian Federation that have risks of deterioration of the socio-economic situation.

The town—forming enterprise of the village is the Vyartsilsky hardware plant for the production of metal products (hardware): wire, nails, metal mesh. There is also a woodworking plant (sawmill) in the village.

There is a hotel and a club hotel for tourists.

== Attractions ==
- Railway station is an architectural monument of the late XIX century.
- Mass grave of 197 Soviet soldiers who died in July 1941 during the defensive battles of the Soviet-Finnish War (1941-1944). In 1979, a granite monument with a bas-relief image of grieving women was erected on the grave.
- Mass graves of Soviet prisoners of war shot by Finnish invaders in 1941–1942. Located 1.5 km from the village, on the left bank of the Yuuvanjoki River. In 1979, a stele of pink Ladoga granite was installed.
- A memorial sign erected in 1992 on the site of the former Lutheran church and the graves of Finnish soldiers who died during the wars of 1918, 1939-1940 and 1941-1944.
- Monument to V. I. Lenin at the entrance to the main entrance of the «Vyartsilsky hardware Factory» (sculptor G. Belyaev, installed in 1957).
- Monument to Nils Ludwig Arppe, founder of the «Vyartsilsky hardware Factory». The monument was opened on August 23, 1936, and consisted of a granite pedestal and a bust. After the war, the bust disappeared, and currently only the granite pedestal has been preserved (located opposite the settlement Administration).
- Orthodox Church of Alexander Nevsky.

== Notable people ==
- Ales Bialiatski (born 1962), Belarusian human rights activist, 2022 Nobel Peace Prize co-laureate
