= Kontiolahti =

Kontiolahti Kontiolax
- Municipality
- Kontiolahden kunta Kontiolax kommun
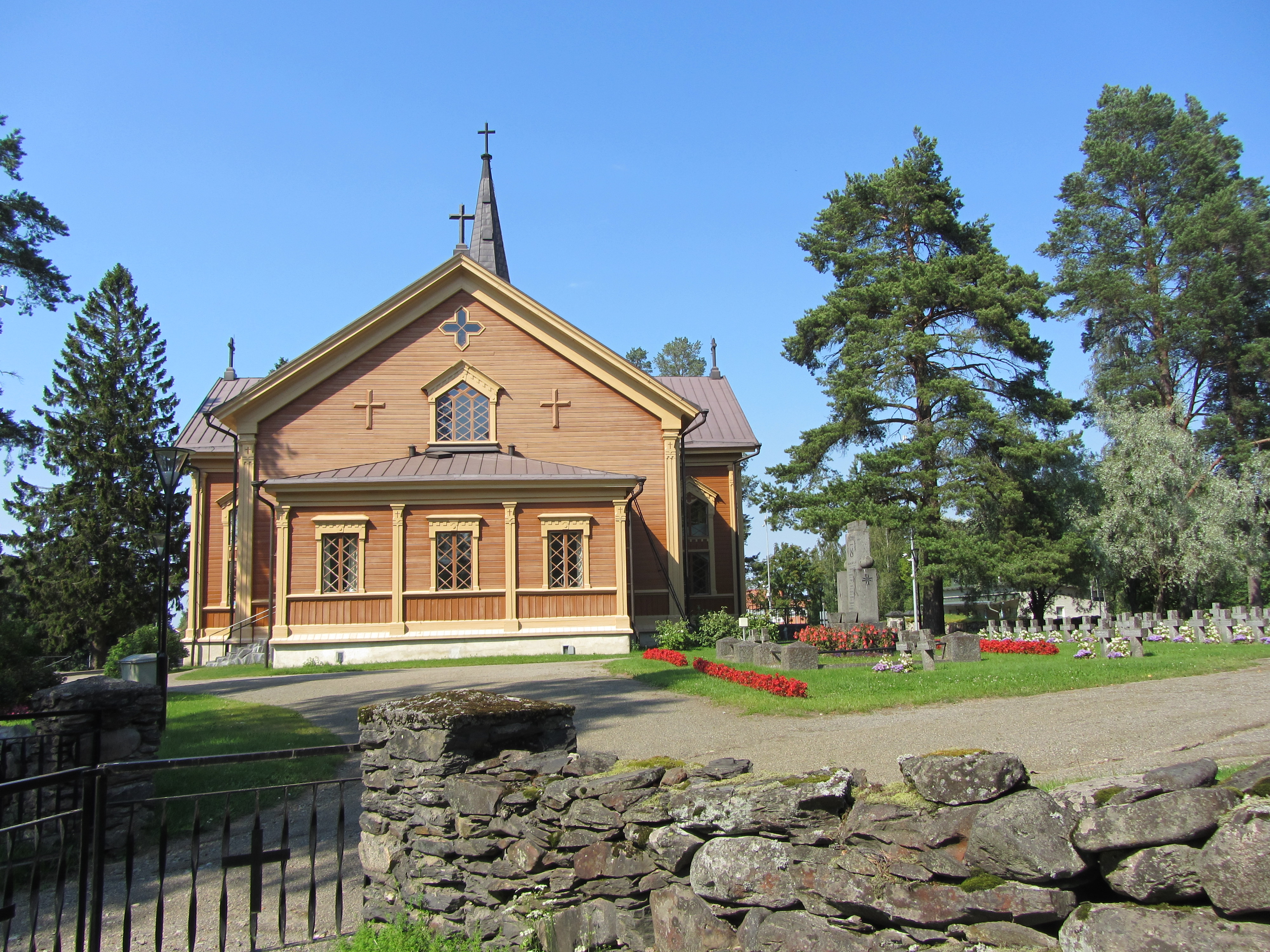
- Kontiolahti Church in July 2012

- Coat of arms

- Location of Kontiolahti in Finland
- Interactive map of Kontiolahti
- Coordinates: 62°46′N 029°51′E
- Country: Finland
- Region: North Karelia
- Sub-region: Joensuu
- Charter: 1873

Government
  - Municipal manager: Jere Penttilä

Area (2018-01-01)
  - Total: 1,029.82 km^{2} (397.62 sq mi)
  - Land: 799.82 km^{2} (308.81 sq mi)
  - Water: 230.1 km^{2} (88.8 sq mi)
  - Rank: 101st largest in Finland

Population (2025-12-31)
  - Total: 15,060
  - Rank: 73rd largest in Finland
  - Density: 18.83/km^{2} (48.8/sq mi)

Population by native language
  - Finnish: 97.7% (official)
  - Others: 2.3%

Population by age
  - 0 to 14: 21.1%
  - 15 to 64: 61%
  - 65 or older: 17.9%
- Time zone: UTC+02:00 (EET)
  - Summer (DST): UTC+03:00 (EEST)
- Website: www.kontiolahti.fi

Kontiolahti (Swedish: Kontiolax; literally meaning "bear bay") is a municipality in Finland. It is located in the North Karelia region, about 20 kilometres (12 mi) north of Joensuu. The municipality has a population of 15,060 (31 December 2025) and covers an area of 1,029.82 square kilometres (397.62 sq mi) of which 230.1 km^{2} (88.8 sq mi) is water. The population density is 18.83 inhabitants per square kilometre (48.8/sq mi). Neighbouring municipalities are Joensuu, Juuka, Lieksa, Liperi and Polvijärvi. The municipality is unilingually Finnish.

The coat of arms of the municipality is a canting arms; the log driving pike pole, which the bear carries in the picture, refers to the importance of forestry in the region's economy. The coat of arms was designed by Aarno Liuksiala and approved by the Kontiolahti Municipal Council at its meeting on December 8, 1952. The coat of arms was approved for use by the Ministry of the Interior on February 27, 1953.

Kontiolahti hosted the Biathlon World Championships in 1990, 1999 and 2015.

== History ==
Kontiolahti originally belonged to the parish of Liperi. It became an independent municipality in 1873. The flood nuisance of Lake Höytiäinen and the desire for water abandonment inspired residents to try to build a canal to lower the water level, but the dam broke uncontrollably in 1859, and the landscape changed dramatically. After World War II, the Ruskeala's migrants were stationed in Kontiolahti.

== Geography ==
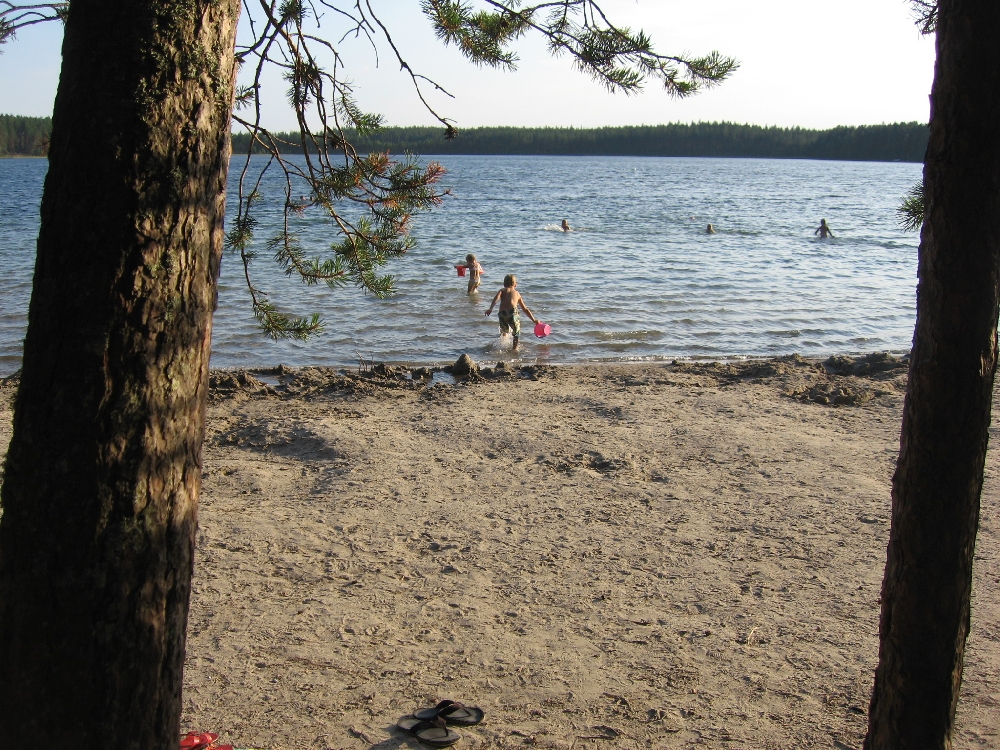
Lake Valkealampi in Kontiolahti

Kontiolahti has 183 lakes, and water bodies cover 22.3 percent (230 km^{2}) of the municipality's surface area. The largest of them are Lake Höytiäinen, Lake Kangasvesi and Lake Herajärvi. There are 11 Natura sites in all or part of Kontiolahti: Teerisaari-Sisuslahti, Soikkeli Forest, Pöllönvaara-Kruununkangas, Paihola Forest, Kolvananuuro and surrounding areas, Koli National Park, Jouhteninen, Huurunlampi-Sammakkolampi-Huurunrinne and Huuhkajanvaara.

=== Villages ===
- Harivaara
- Herajärvi
- Iiksenniitty
- Jakokoski
- Kontiolahti (Kirkonkylä)
- Kontioniemi
- Kulho
- Kunnasniemi
- Kupluskylä
- Kylmäoja
- Lehmo
- Mönni
- Onttola
- Paihola
- Puntarikoski
- Puso
- Pyytivaara
- Rantakylä
- Romppala
- Selkie
- Varparanta
- Venejoki

== Transport ==
Joensuu Region's Public Transport (Joensuun seudun joukkoliikenne; JOJO) is responsible for local and school traffic in the Kontiolahti area. Kontiolahti also has a railway station, which, however, no longer has passenger traffic. Highway 6 passes through the municipality.

== Culture ==
=== Libraries ===
Municipal library services are provided by the Kontiolahti Library, the Lehmo Library, and Runo-Antti, the bookmobile of Kontiolahti and Eno.

=== Food ===
In the 1980s, Kontiolahti's parish dishes were named "shoemaker's roast" (suutarinpaisti) and stockfish soup.

== Notable people ==
- Tero Mustonen (born 1976 or 1977), environmental leader, scholar, scientist, and fisherman
- Jukka Nevalainen (born 1978), former drummer of Nightwish
- Markku Pölönen (born 1957), film director, screenwriter, editor and owner of film production company Suomen Filmiteollisuus
- Antti Puhakka (1816–1893), national romantic poet

== See also ==
- Koli National Park
- Pielinen River
