= Biathlon World Championships 2027 =

2027 edition of the Biathlon World Championships

- Host city: Otepää
- Country: Estonia
- Opening: 9 February
- Closing: 21 February
- Main venue: Roland Arena

The 2027 Biathlon World Championships are scheduled to take place from 9 to 21 February 2027 at the Tehvandi Sports Center in Otepää, Estonia.

== Schedule ==
All times are local (UTC+2).

Date	Time	Event
10 February	17:10	4 × 6 km W+M mixed relay
12 February	17:30	Men's 10 km sprint
13 February	18:00	Women's 7.5 km sprint
14 February	17:05	Women's 10 km pursuit
14 February	19:30	Men's 12.5 km pursuit
16 February	18:10	6 km W + 7.5 km M single mixed relay
17 February	18:10	Men's 20 km individual
18 February	18:10	Women's 15 km individual
19 February	18:30	Men's 4 × 7.5 km relay
20 February	18:30	Women's 4 × 6 km relay
21 February	16:45	Women's 12.5 km mass start
21 February	19:10	Men's 15 km mass start

== Medal summary ==
=== Men ===
Event	Gold	Silver	Bronze
10 km sprint			
12.5 km pursuit			
20 km individual			
4 × 7.5 km relay			
15 km mass start			

=== Women ===
Event	Gold	Silver	Bronze
7.5 km sprint			
10 km pursuit			
15 km individual			
4 × 6 km relay			
12.5 km mass start			

=== Mixed ===
Event	Gold	Silver	Bronze
4 × 6 km W+M relay			
6 km W + 7.5 km M single relay			
