= Selkie, Finland =

Village in Kontiolahti, Finland

Coordinates: 62.65°N 30.133333°E

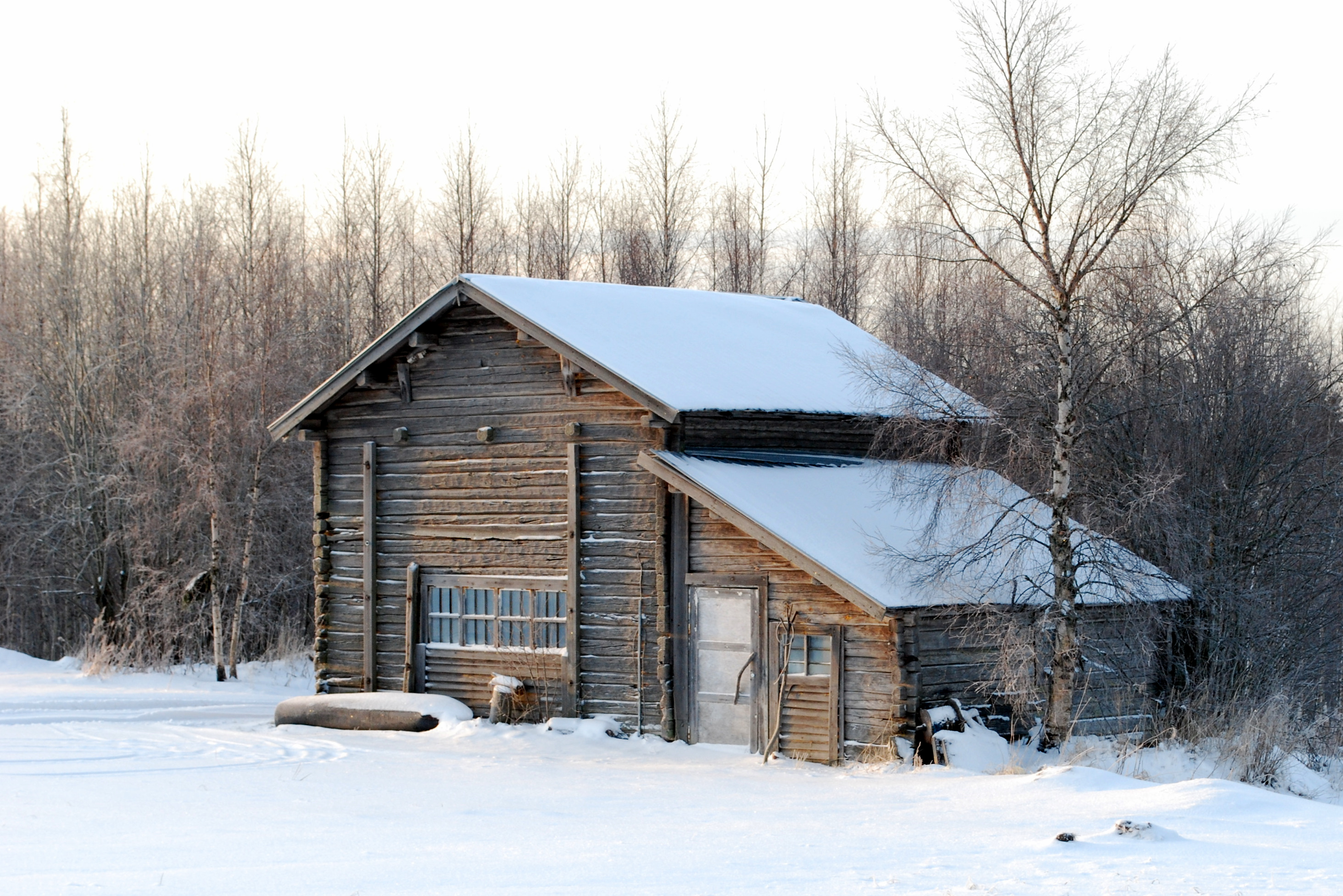
Winter in Selkie

Selkie is a village of Kontiolahti in North Karelia, Finland. It has a population of about 300.

== Notable people ==
- Tero Mustonen, environmental leader and head of the village
