= Tero Mustonen =

Finnish environmental leader (born 1976 or 1977)

- Born: 1976 or 1977 (age 49–50); Finland
- Education: University of Eastern Finland
- Occupations: Environmental leader, scholar, scientist, fisherman
- Years active: 1999–present
- Awards: Goldman Environmental Prize (2023)

Tero Mustonen (born 1976 or 1977) is a Finnish environmental leader, scholar, scientist, and fisherman. He is the head of the village of Selkie, Finland, and the founder and president of the Snowchange Cooperative, an organization made of Indigenous and local communities that is focused on conserving local culture, biodiversity, and ecosystems.

For his efforts to restore damaged peatlands with the Snowchange Cooperative, Mustonen was awarded the Goldman Environmental Prize in 2023.

Mustonen completed a doctoral degree with the University of Eastern Finland in 2009. He remained at the university for several years, working as a part-time researcher and teacher.
