= Kiihtelysvaara =

Former municipality of Finland

Coordinates: 62°29′35″N 30°15′05″E

Map

Coat of arms of Kiihtelysvaara

Kiihtelysvaara is a former municipality of Finland. On 1 January 2005 it was consolidated, together with Tuupovaara, with the city of Joensuu.

It is located in the province of Eastern Finland and is part of the North Karelia region. The municipality had a population of 2,681 (2003) and covered an area of 530.85 km^{2} of which 43.76 is water. The population density was 5.1 inhabitants per km^{2}.

The municipality was unilingually Finnish.
