= Antti Puhakka =

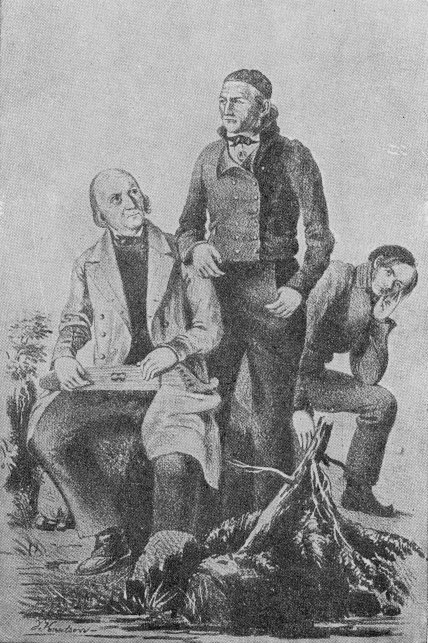
Finnish national romantic poets Olli Kymäläinen, Pietari Makkonen and Antti Puhakka in Johan Knutson's aquarelle.

Antti Puhakka (April 24, 1816 – March 30, 1893) was a Finnish national romantic poet from Kontiolahti in Finnish Karelia. He was known for using Kalevala meter in his poems.

Puhakka was illiterate until the age of 21, but after gaining the skill of writing he wrote nearly 20,000 lines of poetry. He later became a member of the Finnish Literature Society.

Antti Puhakka was elected to the Diet of Finland four times after 1862, representing land-owning peasants, and became a popular politician in Finland.

His most well-known poems are "Tuhman Jussin juttureissu" and "Surulaulu 1850 vuoden kiellosta."
