= Värtsilä, Finland =

Former municipality of Finland, now part of Tohmajärvi

Coordinates: 62°12′04″N 30°36′37″E

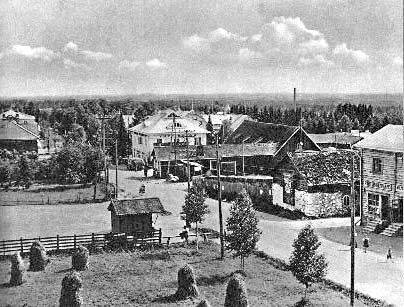
Värtsilä's centre in the 1930s

Värtsilä (Finnish: [ˈʋærtsilæ]) is a former municipality of Finland. It merged with Tohmajärvi in 2005. It included the international border crossing between Niirala and Vyartsilya.

Värtsilä was located in the province of Eastern Finland and was part of the North Karelia region. The municipality had a population of 660 (2005) and covered an area of 143.81 square kilometres (55.53 sq mi) of which 7.88 km^{2} (3.04 sq mi) was water. The population density was 4.8/km^{2} (12/sq mi).

The main language spoken in Värtsilä is Finnish but new settlers from Russia and people evacuated from the lost Karelian areas after the Second World War form Russian and Karelian speaking minorities.

In addition to the current village, Värtsilä used to include the urban settlement of Vyartsilya (Russian: Вяртсиля), which since 1944 has belonged to Russia.

The biggest employers in the village include the Finnish Border Guard and Finnish Customs.

== 1679 uprising ==
Värtsilä rebellion
Date	1679
Location	Värtsilä
Result	Rebellion quelled

Belligerents
Swedish Empire	Rebels

Commanders and leaders
(Swedish Empire) Nils Kagg (Swedish Empire) Sven Stille	Unknown (executed)

In 1679, Nils Kagg sent his inspector Sven Stille to demand taxes from the peasants in Tohmajärvi that had not paid it, however, in Värtsilä, Sven was met with a mob of angry peasants, who threatened him and his family until he was forced to flee. After this, Swedish troops were called and were able quell the uprising. The amount of resistance that the peasants gave the troops is not known, and two of the leaders were executed.
