= Tuupovaara =

- Former town
- Tuupovaaran kunta Tuupovaara kommun
- Coat of arms

- Location of Tuupovaara in Finland
- Coordinates: 60°04′15″N 023°39′45″E
- Country: Finland
- Region: North Karelia
- Founded: 1910

Area
  - Total: 661.34 km^{2} (255.34 sq mi)
  - Land: 604.79 km^{2} (233.51 sq mi)
  - Water: 56.55 km^{2} (21.83 sq mi)

Population (2004)
  - Total: 2,217
- Time zone: UTC+2 (EET)
  - Summer (DST): UTC+3 (EEST)

Tuupovaara (Kovero until 1913) is a former municipality of Finland, located in the province of North Karelia. It was consolidated, together with Kiihtelysvaara, into the municipality of Joensuu on January 1, 2005. The municipality had a population of 2,217 (2004) and covered an area of 661.34 km^{2} of which 56.55 km^{2} is water. The population density was 3.7 inhabitants per km^{2}.

The municipality was unilingually Finnish.

The famous rally driver Ari Vatanen was born in Tuupovaara on April 27, 1952.
