= Lake Tohmajärvi =

Lake in North Karelia, Finland

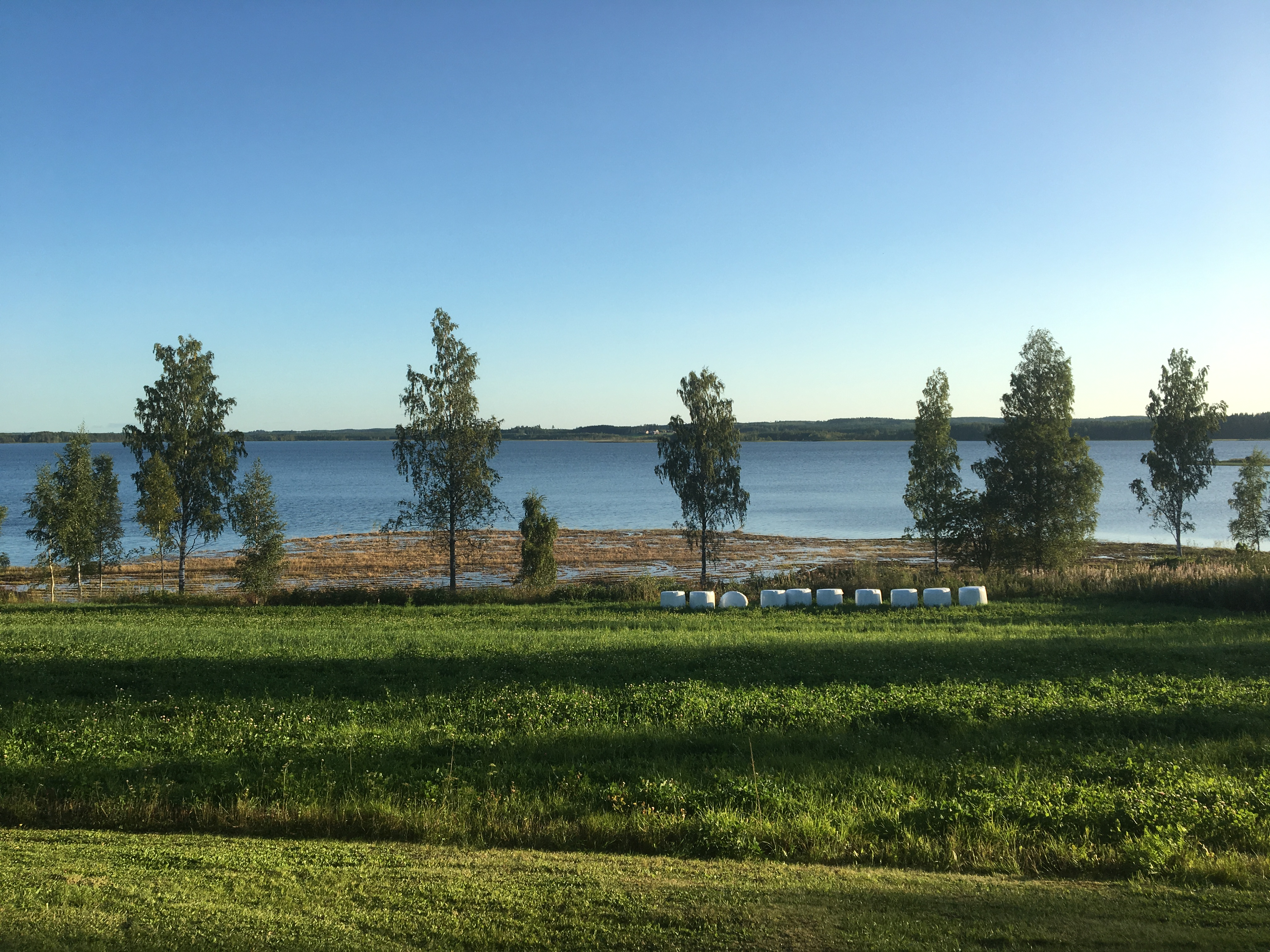

- Location within Finland
- Coordinates: 62.1797059°N 30.3879785°E
- Catchment area: Tohmajoki
- Basin countries: Finland
- Surface area: 12.128 km^{2} (4.683 sq mi)
- Average depth: 3.06 m (10.0 ft)
- Max. depth: 14 m (46 ft)
- Water volume: 0.0372 km^{3} (30,200 acre⋅ft)
- Shore length^{1}: 32.82 km (20.39 mi)
- Surface elevation: 80.2 m (263 ft)
- Frozen: December–April
- ^{1} Shore length is not a well-defined measure.

Lake Tohmajärvi is a medium-sized shallow lake in the Tohmajoki main catchment area. It is located in the North Karelia region, in the very east of Finland, just outside the town of Tohmajärvi next to the border with Russia.

== See also ==
- List of lakes in Finland
