= Tohmajärvi =

- Municipality
- Tohmajärven kunta Tohmajärvi kommun
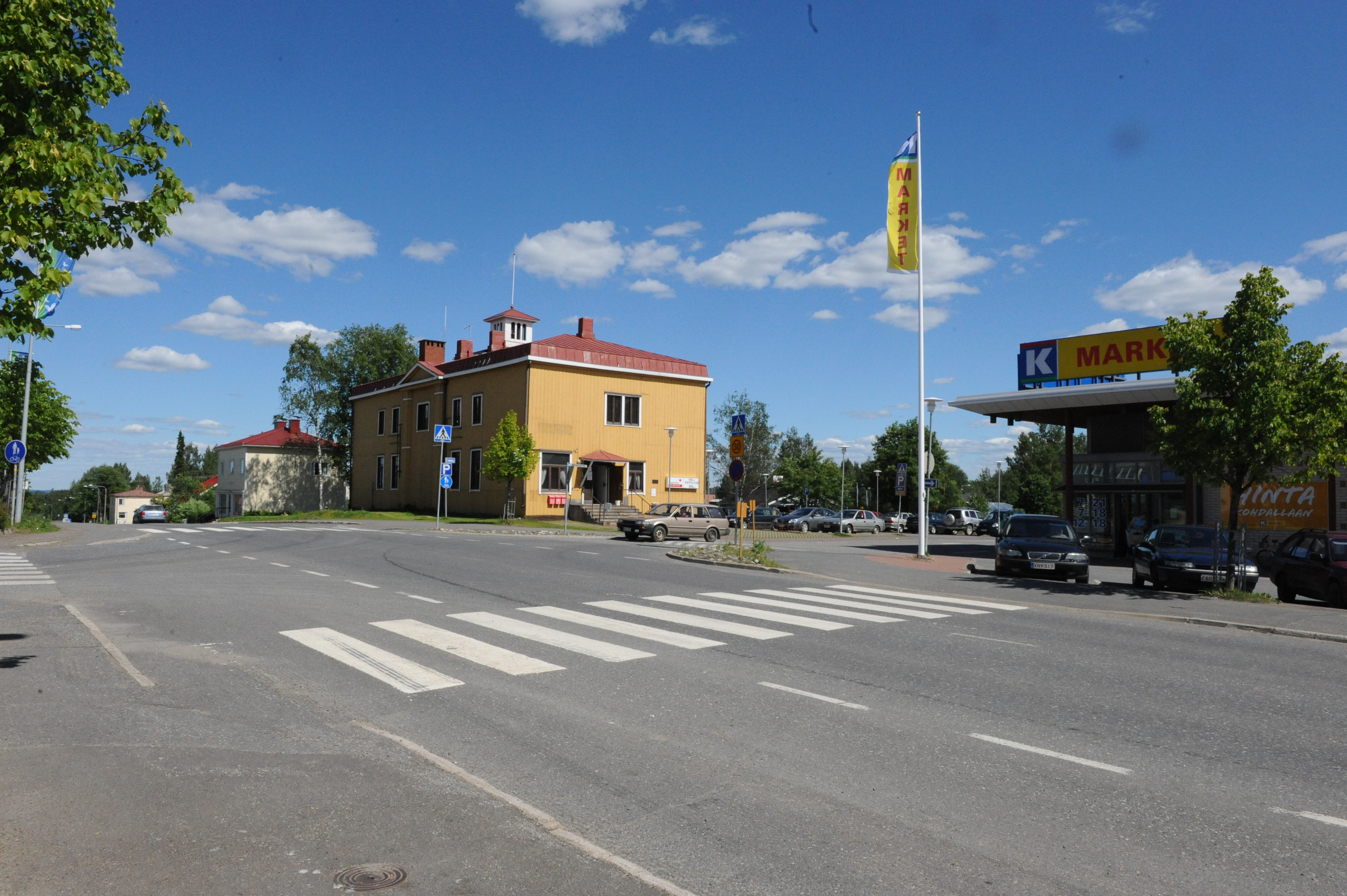
- Kemie, the central village of Tohmajärvi.

- Coat of arms

- Location of Tohmajärvi in Finland
- Interactive map of Tohmajärvi
- Coordinates: 62°14′N 30°20′E
- Country: Finland
- Region: North Karelia
- Sub-region: Central Karelia
- Charter: 1869
- Seat: Kemie

Government
  - Municipal manager: Olli Riikonen

Area (2018-01-01)
  - Total: 895.36 km^{2} (345.70 sq mi)
  - Land: 837.82 km^{2} (323.48 sq mi)
  - Water: 57.62 km^{2} (22.25 sq mi)
  - Rank: 93rd largest in Finland

Population (2025-12-31)
  - Total: 3,869
  - Rank: 195th largest in Finland
  - Density: 4.62/km^{2} (12.0/sq mi)

Population by native language
  - Finnish: 93.6% (official)
  - Others: 6.4%

Population by age
  - 0 to 14: 12.8%
  - 15 to 64: 53.8%
  - 65 or older: 33.4%
- Time zone: UTC+02:00 (EET)
  - Summer (DST): UTC+03:00 (EEST)
- Website: www.tohmajarvi.fi/en/web/english

Tohmajärvi (Finnish pronunciation: [ˈtohmɑˌjærʋi]) is a municipality of Finland. It is located in the North Karelia region. The municipality has a population of 3,869 (31 December 2025) and covers an area of 895.36 square kilometres (345.70 sq mi) of which 57.62 km^{2} (22.25 sq mi) is water. The population density is 4.62 inhabitants per square kilometre (12.0/sq mi). The municipality is unilingually Finnish.

Neighbouring municipalities are Joensuu, Kitee and Rääkkylä. The municipality of Värtsilä was consolidated with Tohmajärvi in 2005. Sortavala, a town in the Republic of Karelia, is located 81 kilometres (50 mi) south of Tohmajärvi.

Tohmajärvi is located along the Blue Highway, which is an international tourist route from Mo i Rana, Norway to Pudozh, Russia via Sweden. The border crossing to Russia, Niirala, is in Värtsilä, now part of Tohmajärvi.

One of the most significant highways in Tohmajärvi is Highway 9, which runs west through Joensuu, Kuopio, Jyväskylä and Tampere to Turku. The Blue Highway follows this highway to Tohmajärvi.

== Climate ==
Tohmajärvi has a subarctic climate (Köppen: Dfc).

Climate data for Tohmajärvi Kemie (1991-2020 normals, extremes 1959-present)
Month	Jan	Feb	Mar	Apr	May	Jun	Jul	Aug	Sep	Oct	Nov	Dec	Year
Record high °C (°F)	5.9 (42.6)	7.4 (45.3)	13.1 (55.6)	24.7 (76.5)	30.2 (86.4)	32.3 (90.1)	35.4 (95.7)	31.8 (89.2)	26.9 (80.4)	18.9 (66.0)	11.8 (53.2)	8.6 (47.5)	35.4 (95.7)
Mean maximum °C (°F)	2.5 (36.5)	2.4 (36.3)	7.8 (46.0)	16.2 (61.2)	24.1 (75.4)	26.8 (80.2)	28.1 (82.6)	26.2 (79.2)	20.6 (69.1)	12.8 (55.0)	7.0 (44.6)	3.3 (37.9)	29.1 (84.4)
Mean daily maximum °C (°F)	−5.5 (22.1)	−4.9 (23.2)	0.6 (33.1)	7.2 (45.0)	14.8 (58.6)	19.4 (66.9)	22.1 (71.8)	19.8 (67.6)	13.8 (56.8)	6.2 (43.2)	0.5 (32.9)	−2.9 (26.8)	7.6 (45.7)
Daily mean °C (°F)	−8.6 (16.5)	−8.8 (16.2)	−4.0 (24.8)	2.2 (36.0)	8.9 (48.0)	13.9 (57.0)	16.6 (61.9)	14.3 (57.7)	9.3 (48.7)	3.4 (38.1)	−1.7 (28.9)	−5.5 (22.1)	3.3 (38.0)
Mean daily minimum °C (°F)	−12.2 (10.0)	−12.8 (9.0)	−8.8 (16.2)	−2.9 (26.8)	2.4 (36.3)	7.6 (45.7)	10.7 (51.3)	9.0 (48.2)	5.0 (41.0)	0.5 (32.9)	−4.2 (24.4)	−8.7 (16.3)	−1.2 (29.8)
Mean minimum °C (°F)	−29.3 (−20.7)	−28.9 (−20.0)	−22.8 (−9.0)	−12.8 (9.0)	−5.2 (22.6)	−0.2 (31.6)	3.8 (38.8)	1.1 (34.0)	−3.2 (26.2)	−9.8 (14.4)	−16.1 (3.0)	−23.7 (−10.7)	−32.5 (−26.5)
Record low °C (°F)	−42.4 (−44.3)	−39.4 (−38.9)	−37.0 (−34.6)	−28.8 (−19.8)	−13.6 (7.5)	−4.1 (24.6)	−0.4 (31.3)	−4.1 (24.6)	−9.0 (15.8)	−20.1 (−4.2)	−29.3 (−20.7)	−37.3 (−35.1)	−42.4 (−44.3)
Average precipitation mm (inches)	53 (2.1)	43 (1.7)	39 (1.5)	31 (1.2)	44 (1.7)	70 (2.8)	80 (3.1)	87 (3.4)	67 (2.6)	71 (2.8)	60 (2.4)	62 (2.4)	707 (27.7)
Average precipitation days (≥ 1.0 mm)	12	10	9	7	9	11	11	11	11	13	13	13	130
Source 1: FMI normals 1991-2020
Source 2: Record highs and lows 1959- present

== Notable people ==
- Anna Easteden, actress and model
- Katri Helena, singer
- Siiri Rantanen, skier
- Seppo Räty, javelin thrower
- Algot Untola, author and journalist

== See also ==
- Lake Tohmajärvi
- Tohmajärvi Church
