= Joensuu =

City in North Karelia, Finland

Joensuu Jovensuu (Karelian)
- City
- Joensuun kaupunki Joensuu stad Jovensuun linna City of Joensuu
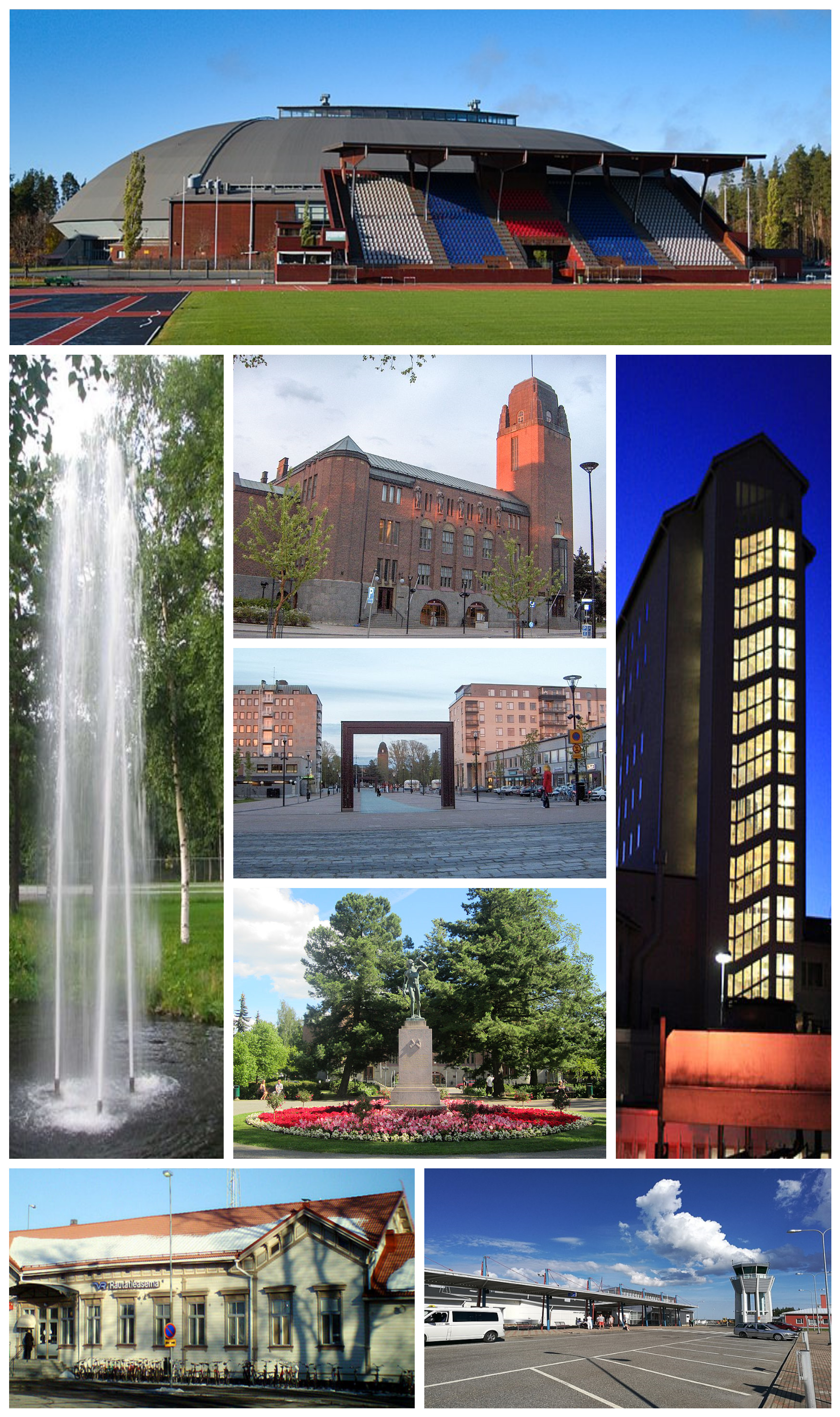
- Clockwise from top-left: the Joensuu Arena, the North Karelia Central Hospital, the Joensuu Airport, the Joensuu Railway Station, and the fountain in the park; in the middle from top to bottom: the Joensuu City Hall, the Gate of Joensuu (Joensuun portti) near the market square, and the Statue of Liberty in the Park of Liberty

- Flag Coat of arms
- Nicknames: Jönssi, Jenssi
- Location of Joensuu in Finland
- Interactive map of Joensuu
- Coordinates: 62°36′N 029°45′E
- Country: Finland
- Region: North Karelia
- Sub-region: Joensuu
- Charter: 1848

Government
  - City manager: Jere Penttilä

Area (2018-01-01)
  - Total: 2,751.07 km^{2} (1,062.19 sq mi)
  - Land: 2,381.79 km^{2} (919.61 sq mi)
  - Water: 369.31 km^{2} (142.59 sq mi)
  - Rank: 26th largest in Finland

Population (2025-12-31)
  - Total: 79,129
  - Rank: 11th largest in Finland
  - Density: 33.22/km^{2} (86.0/sq mi)
- Demonym: joensuulainen (Finnish)

Population by native language
  - Finnish: 90.5% (official)
  - Swedish: 0.1%
  - Others: 9.4%

Population by age
  - 0 to 14: 13.5%
  - 15 to 64: 64.1%
  - 65 or older: 22.5%
- Time zone: UTC+02:00 (EET)
  - Summer (DST): UTC+03:00 (EEST)
- Unemployment rate: 14.5%
- Website: www.joensuu.fi

Joensuu (Finnish: [ˈjoensuː]; Karelian: Jovensuu, lit. 'river's mouth') is a city in Finland and the regional capital of North Karelia. It is located by the Pielisjoki River in the eastern interior of the country and in the Finnish Lakeland. The population of Joensuu is approximately 79,000, while the sub-region has a population of approximately 128,000. It is the 11th-most populous municipality in Finland, and the 9th-most populous urban area in the country.

Joensuu was founded in 1848 by the Russian Emperor Nicholas I during Grand Duchy of Finland period. The city is located on the northern shore of Lake Pyhäselkä, the northern part of Lake Saimaa, at the mouth of the River Pielinen. The nearest major city, Kuopio in North Savo, is located 136 kilometres (85 mi) to the west. From Joensuu, the distance to Lappeenranta, the capital of South Karelia, is 233 kilometres (145 mi) along Highway 6.

As is typical of cities in Eastern Finland, Joensuu is monolingually Finnish. Along with Kuopio, Joensuu is one of the major urban, economic, and cultural hubs of Eastern Finland. Joensuu is a student city with a subsidiary of the University of Eastern Finland and the Karelia University of Applied Sciences.

== Heraldry ==
The explanation of the coat of arms of Joensuu reads: "shield twice blocked with upper moat and lower corrugated; fields in red, silver and black." The wave bar of the subject refers to the location of the city along the Pielinen River and the position of the moat near the eastern border of Finland, while its colors black and red are considered typical colors of Karelia. The coat of arms was designed by Toivo Vuorela, and it was approved by the Joensuu City Council at its meeting on May 10, 1957. The Ministry of the Interior confirmed the use of the coat of arms on November 19 of the same year. In addition to the coat of arms, the city of Joensuu also uses a flag based on it, in which the silver of the coat of arms has been replaced by white.

Coat of arms of Joensuu

(1848–1850)

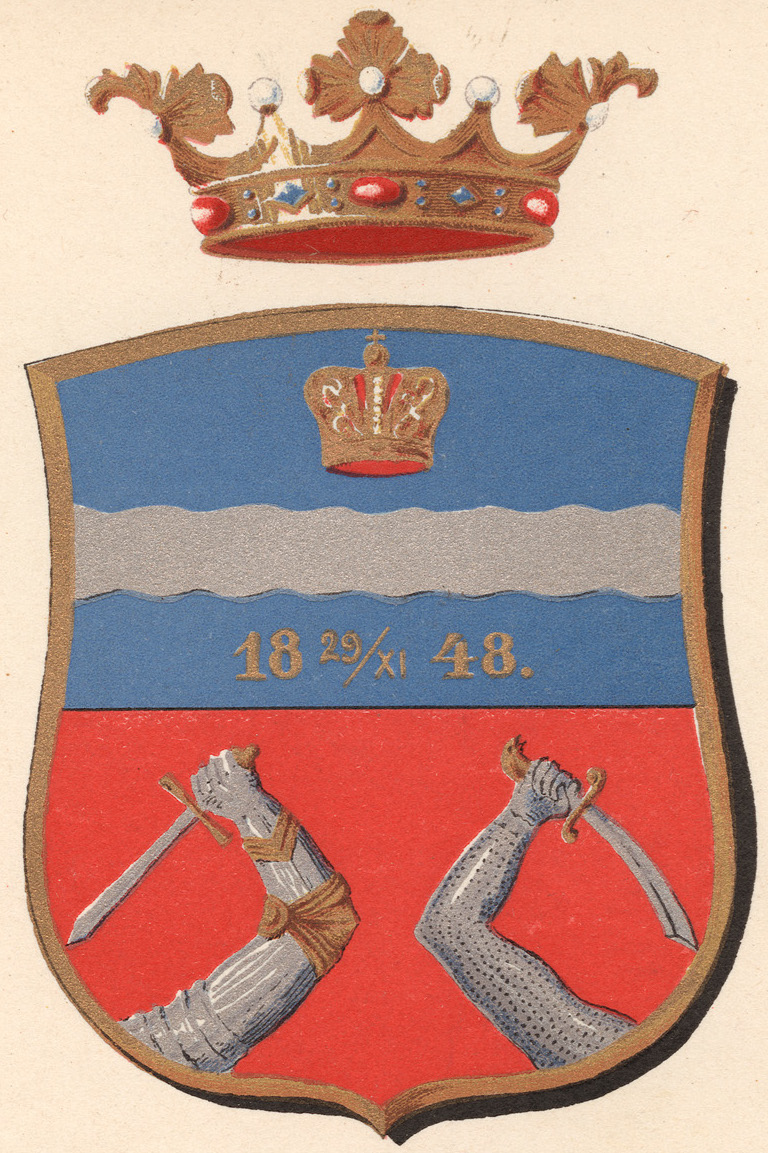
(1850-1900s)

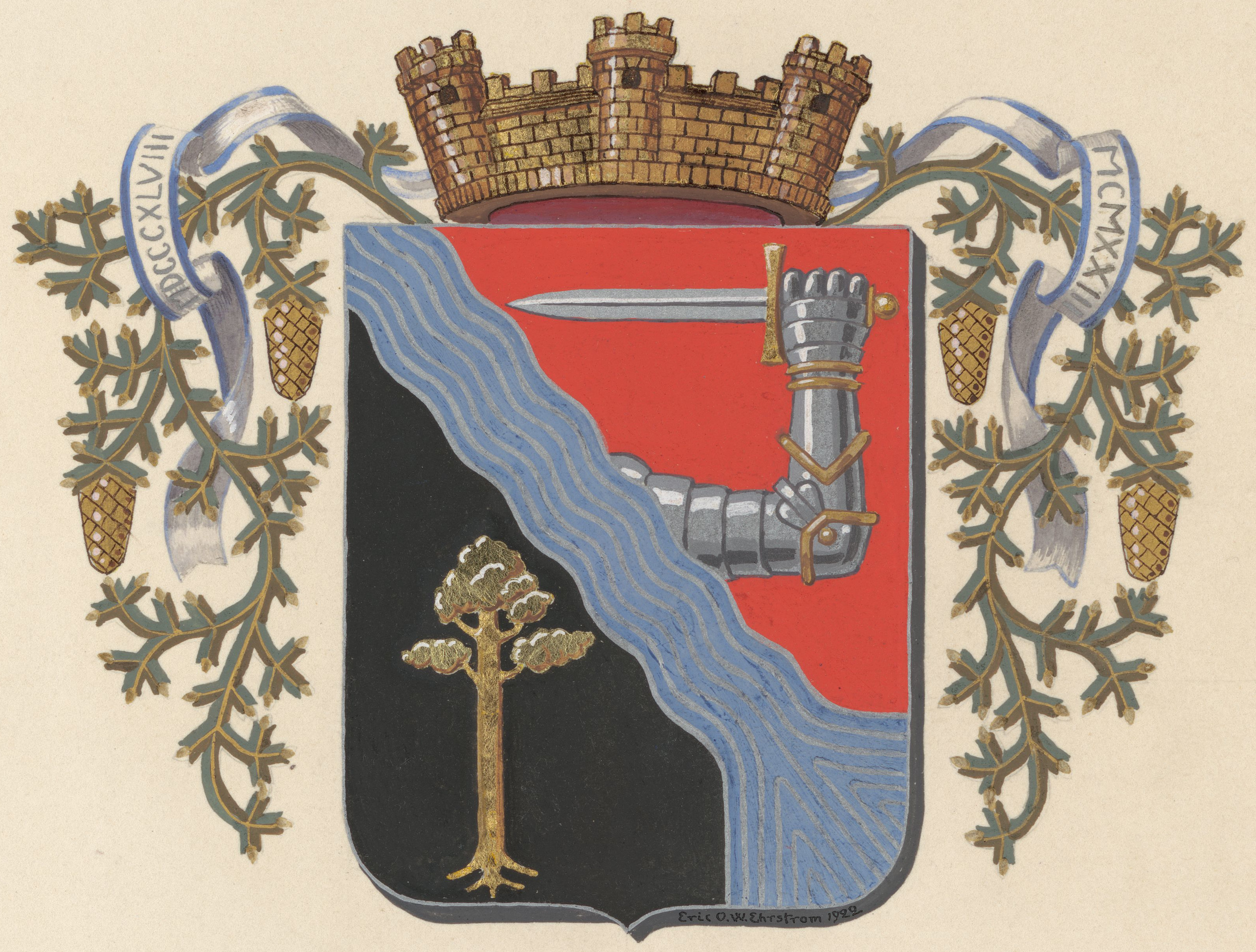
(1923-1957)

(1952)

(1957-)

== History ==
The city of Joensuu, founded by the Czar Nicholas I of Russia in 1848, is the regional centre and the capital of North Karelia. During the 19th century Joensuu was a city of manufacture and commerce. When in 1860 the city received dispensation rights to initiate commerce, former restrictions against industry were removed and the local sawmills began to prosper and expand. Water traffic was improved by the building and opening of the Saimaa Canal in 1856. Consequently, a lively commerce between the regions of North Karelia, St. Petersburg and Central Europe was enabled. At the end of the 19th century Joensuu was one of the largest harbour cities in Finland.

Throughout the centuries Karelian traders have plied the Pielisjoki River. The river has always been the lively heart of the city. Canals – completed by 1870 – increased the river traffic. Thousands of steamboats, barges and logging boats sailed along the river during the golden age of river traffic. The Pielisjoki River has also been an important log raft route, providing wood for the sawmills and for the entire lumber industry.

During the last few decades, the formerly modest agrarian town has developed into a vital centre of the province. Success in regional annexations, the establishment of the region of North Karelia, and investments in education have been the most decisive actions in this development.

The municipality of Pielisensuu was consolidated with Joensuu in 1954. At the beginning of 2005, the municipalities of Kiihtelysvaara and Tuupovaara were consolidated with Joensuu. At the beginning of 2009 the municipalities of Eno and Pyhäselkä were consolidated with Joensuu. After the most recent consolidations, there are approximately 73,000 inhabitants in the Joensuu municipal area.

The University of Joensuu which was established in 1969 and now part of the University of Eastern Finland since January 2010 has in twenty-five years, expanded to eight faculties. The university is one of the mainstays of the city and so for all North Karelia. Diversified international cooperation in science, industry and commerce benefits the whole region.

The proximity of the eastern border has been an important factor in the history of the city. The Republic of Karelia is once again a significant area for cooperation with nearby regions in Russia. Export companies in Joensuu continue the pre-revolutionary traditions in foreign trade.

Joensuu offers varied cultural activities. A series of events – Ilosaarirock festival, Joensuu Music Winter, Festival of Visual Culture Viscult, Gospel festivals – and the unspoilt environment increases the attractiveness of the city.

Joensuu is sometimes referred to as the Forest Capital of Europe, mainly because the European Forest Institute is based there. Other forestry research and educational facilities are also based in Joensuu.

== Geography ==
The neighboring municipalities of Joensuu are Liperi, Kontiolahti, Lieksa, Ilomantsi, Tohmajärvi and Rääkkylä. In addition, the city is part of the Joensuu sub-region, which currently also includes the municipalities of Heinävesi, Ilomantsi, Juuka, Kontiolahti, Liperi and Polvijärvi, as well as the town of Outokumpu.

=== Climate ===
Joensuu has a subarctic climate (Köppen: Dfc) closely bordering on a humid continental climate (Köppen climate classification: Dfb) due to its high latitude and inland position. Being quite far inland, Joensuu has a more continental climate than most of Finland. As a result, Joensuu can be prone to temperature extremes both in winter and summer. For example, Joensuu is on average warmer than Dublin or Manchester in July, and colder than Moscow in January. Winters are long, cold and snowy. Summers however, bring frequent temperatures above 20.0 °C (68.0 °F) and thunderstorms occur typically on 10–15 days per year. The highest temperature ever recorded 37.2 °C (99.0 °F) on July 29, 2010, is the highest recorded temperature in Finland and the second highest ever recorded temperature in the Nordic countries, only behind Sweden's all time record at 38.0 °C (100.4 °F). The lowest temperature ever recorded in Joensuu was −40.0 °C (−40.0 °F) on December 10, 1955. In winter, the snowcover is reliable and on average 50–70 cm deep. Annually, Joensuu experiences on average 24 days with temperatures −20 °C (−4 °F) or colder while temperature below −30 °C (−22 °F) is observed about once per year. Annual total precipitation averages at 589 mm, with about 225 mm of it falling in the form of snow.

Climate data for Joensuu (1991–2020, extremes 1955–present, 1961-1990 sunshine)
Month	Jan	Feb	Mar	Apr	May	Jun	Jul	Aug	Sep	Oct	Nov	Dec	Year
Record high °C (°F)	6.7 (44.1)	7.8 (46.0)	12.8 (55.0)	23.5 (74.3)	29.3 (84.7)	32.0 (89.6)	37.2 (99.0)	31.4 (88.5)	26.1 (79.0)	18.7 (65.7)	11.1 (52.0)	8.3 (46.9)	37.2 (99.0)
Mean maximum °C (°F)	2.8 (37.0)	2.4 (36.3)	6.6 (43.9)	15.0 (59.0)	23.6 (74.5)	26.7 (80.1)	28.1 (82.6)	25.8 (78.4)	20.1 (68.2)	12.5 (54.5)	7.1 (44.8)	3.3 (37.9)	29.2 (84.6)
Mean daily maximum °C (°F)	−5.6 (21.9)	−5.4 (22.3)	−0.1 (31.8)	6.3 (43.3)	13.9 (57.0)	19.0 (66.2)	21.9 (71.4)	19.4 (66.9)	13.4 (56.1)	6.0 (42.8)	0.4 (32.7)	−3.1 (26.4)	7.2 (45.0)
Daily mean °C (°F)	−8.6 (16.5)	−8.6 (16.5)	−4.0 (24.8)	2.0 (35.6)	9.0 (48.2)	14.3 (57.7)	17.3 (63.1)	15.1 (59.2)	9.8 (49.6)	3.6 (38.5)	−1.6 (29.1)	−5.5 (22.1)	3.6 (38.5)
Mean daily minimum °C (°F)	−12 (10)	−12.2 (10.0)	−8.1 (17.4)	−2.3 (27.9)	3.5 (38.3)	9.3 (48.7)	12.5 (54.5)	10.8 (51.4)	6.3 (43.3)	1.0 (33.8)	−3.9 (25.0)	−8.4 (16.9)	−0.3 (31.5)
Mean minimum °C (°F)	−26.8 (−16.2)	−25.3 (−13.5)	−19.0 (−2.2)	−11.2 (11.8)	−3.9 (25.0)	2.3 (36.1)	6.7 (44.1)	4.7 (40.5)	−0.9 (30.4)	−7.5 (18.5)	−14.7 (5.5)	−22.0 (−7.6)	−29.5 (−21.1)
Record low °C (°F)	−39.0 (−38.2)	−38.5 (−37.3)	−32.1 (−25.8)	−21.4 (−6.5)	−10.5 (13.1)	−4.2 (24.4)	2.2 (36.0)	−1.7 (28.9)	−7.2 (19.0)	−16.8 (1.8)	−27.3 (−17.1)	−40.0 (−40.0)	−40.0 (−40.0)
Average precipitation mm (inches)	45 (1.8)	37 (1.5)	33 (1.3)	30 (1.2)	44 (1.7)	64 (2.5)	66 (2.6)	73 (2.9)	57 (2.2)	60 (2.4)	53 (2.1)	54 (2.1)	616 (24.3)
Average precipitation days (≥ 0.1 mm)	21	17	14	12	12	15	15	16	16	18	20	21	197
Mean monthly sunshine hours	30.0	69.3	130.7	174.2	259.0	264.4	265.3	196.5	114.4	62.0	23.8	16.4	1,606
Source 1: FMI (Temperature data for Liperi Airport elevation 121 m, precipitation Joensuu Pyhäselkä elevation 79 m)
Source 2: NOAA

== Demographics ==
=== Population ===
Historical population
Year	Pop.	±% p.a.
1850	129	—
1870	1,087	+11.25%
1890	2,819	+4.88%
1910	4,789	+2.69%
1920	4,946	+0.32%
1930	5,196	+0.49%
1939	5,971	+1.56%
1972	60,095	+7.25%
1980	63,969	+0.78%
1990	67,363	+0.52%
2000	71,013	+0.53%
2010	73,305	+0.32%
2020	76,935	+0.48%
Source: Tilastollinen päätoimisto, Statistics Finland (1972-2020)

The city of Joensuu has 79,129 inhabitants, making it the 11th most populous municipality in Finland. The Joensuu region has a population of 127,716.

Population size 1980–2025
Year	Population
1990	67,363
1995	70,507
2000	71,013
2005	72,292
2010	73,305
2015	75,514
2020	76,935
2025	79,129

=== Languages ===
Population by
mother tongue (2025)
1. Finnish (90.5%)
2. Russian (3.30%)
3. Ukrainian (0.80%)
4. English (0.40%)
5. Arabic (0.40%)
6. Nepali (0.40%)
7. Bengali (0.40%)
8. Other (3.80%)

Joensuu is a monolingual Finnish-speaking municipality. The majority of the population, 71,628 persons (90.5%), spoke Finnish as their first language. In addition, the number of Swedish speakers was 82 persons (0.1%) of the population. Foreign languages were spoken by 9.4% of the population. As English and Swedish are compulsory school subjects, functional bilingualism or trilingualism acquired through language studies is not uncommon.

At least 40 different languages are spoken in Joensuu. The most commonly spoken foreign languages are Russian (3.3%), Ukrainian (0.8%), Arabic (0.4%) and English (0.4%).

=== Immigration ===
Population by country of birth (2025)
Country of birth	Population	%
Finland	71,850	90.8
Soviet Union	1,613	2.0
Russia	1,016	1.3
Ukraine	407	0.5
Nepal	285	0.4
India	259	0.3
Bangladesh	237	0.3
China	224	0.3
Pakistan	208	0.3
Sri Lanka	205	0.3
Other	3,135	4.0

As of 2024, there were 6,814 persons with a foreign background living in Joensuu, or 9% of the population. (Note: Statistics Finland classifies a person as having a "foreign background" if both parents or the only known parent were born abroad.) The number of residents who were born abroad was 6,6626, or 8% of the population. The number of persons with foreign citizenship living in Joensuu was 4,911. Most foreign-born citizens came from the former Soviet Union, Russia, Ukraine, Sweden and Bangladesh.

The relative share of immigrants in Joensuu's population is below to the national average. However, the city's new residents are increasingly of foreign origin. This will increase the proportion of foreign residents in the coming years.

=== Religion ===
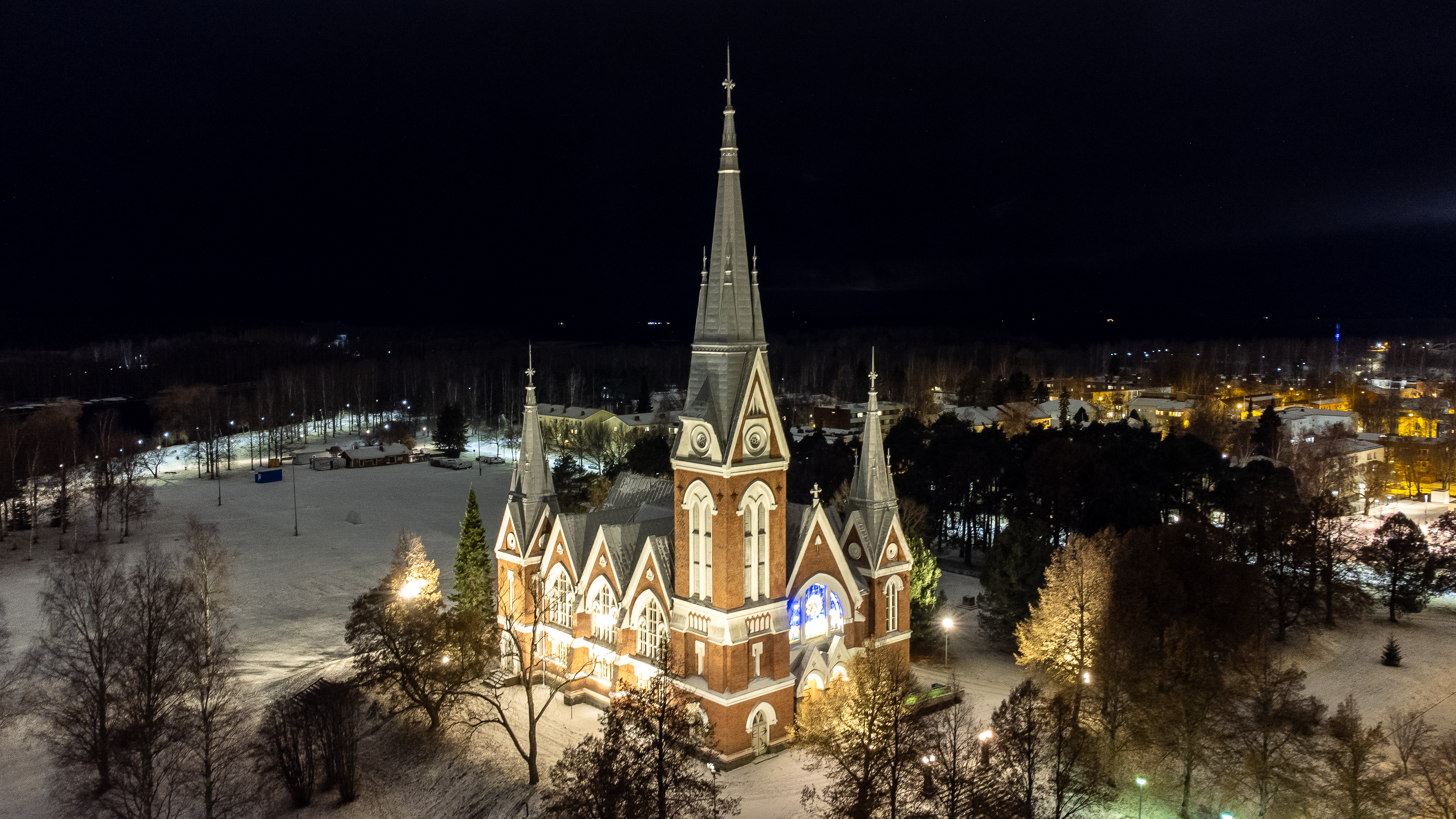
Joensuu Evangelical Lutheran Church

In 2023, the Evangelical Lutheran Church was the largest religious group with 62.8% of the population of Joensuu. Other religious groups accounted for 6.2% of the population. 31.0% of the population had no religious affiliation.

== Economy ==
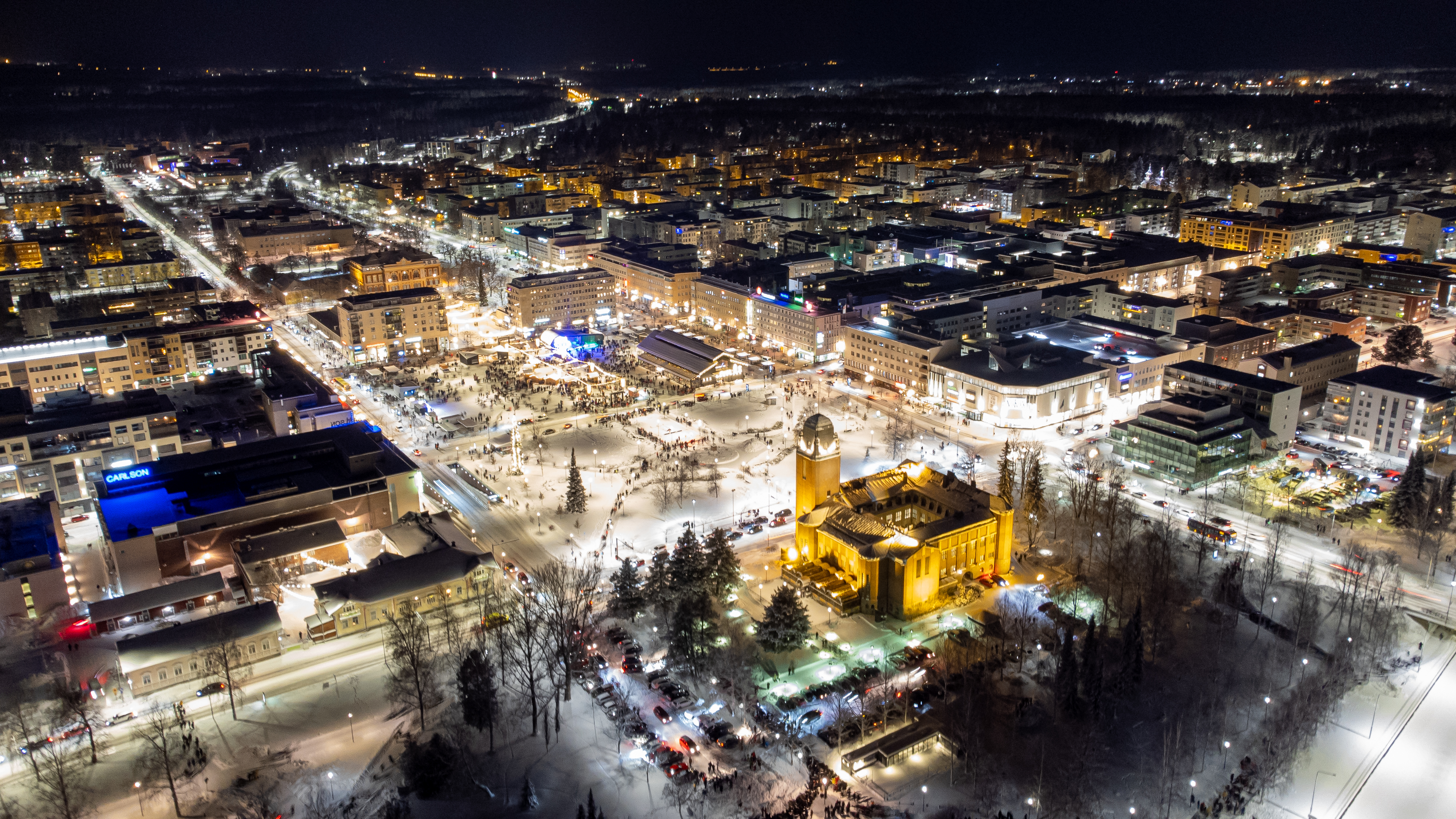
Joensuu Market Square and Joensuu City Hall

Joensuu is a growing provincial center with a service-oriented business life. The concentration of information and communication technology companies has taken place in the premises offered by the Joensuu Science Park. Major industrial companies include lock manufacturer Abloy Oy and forest machine manufacturer John Deere. Research and product development in Joensuu is held at the university, science park, METLA and a few companies in areas such as color research and diffractive optics. The companies that paid the most corporate tax in 2015 were Broman Group Oy, which sells car spare parts and accessories, the key company Assa Abloy Oy, the North Karelia Cooperative, E. Hartikainen Oy, which operates in the construction and car business areas, and Autokiinteistöt Laakkonen Oy.

The unemployment rate in Joensuu on December 31, 2018 was 14.7%. Largest employers in 2006: City of Joensuu (4,409 employees), North Karelia Hospital District Consortium (2,220), University of Joensuu (1,244), Abloy Oy (800), North Karelia Education Consortium (537), Pohjois-Karjalan Osuuskauppa or PKO (512), VR companies (430), Pohjois-Karjalan Kirjapaino Oyj or PunaMusta Media (317) and Schauman Wood Oy (292). In the 2010s, the Palkeet Agency and the Finnish Defense Forces Service Center were established in Joensuu.

There are four shopping centers in Joensuu: Iso Myy, Metropol, Plaza Centrum and one department store belonging to the Sokos chain.

== Transport ==
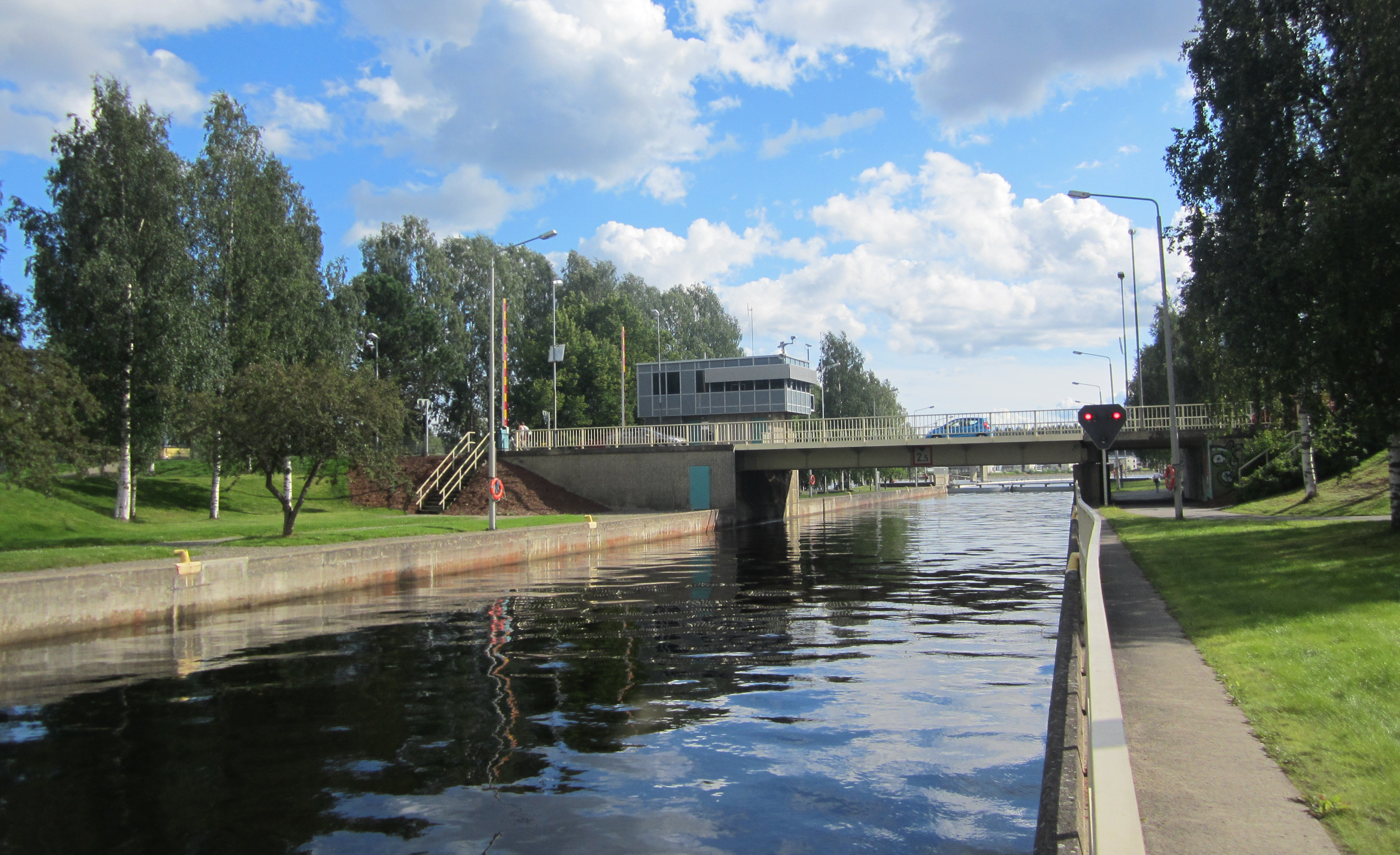
Joensuu Canal

Joensuu has a railway station and a bus station, which offers intercity connections to Helsinki and local connections to several other places. Numbered bus service is available to all parts of Joensuu. Joensuu also has an airport (located in nearby Liperi), with flights to Helsinki.

Joensuu is located along the Blue Highway, which is an international tourist route from Mo i Rana, Norway to Pudozh, Russia via Sweden.

== Sports ==
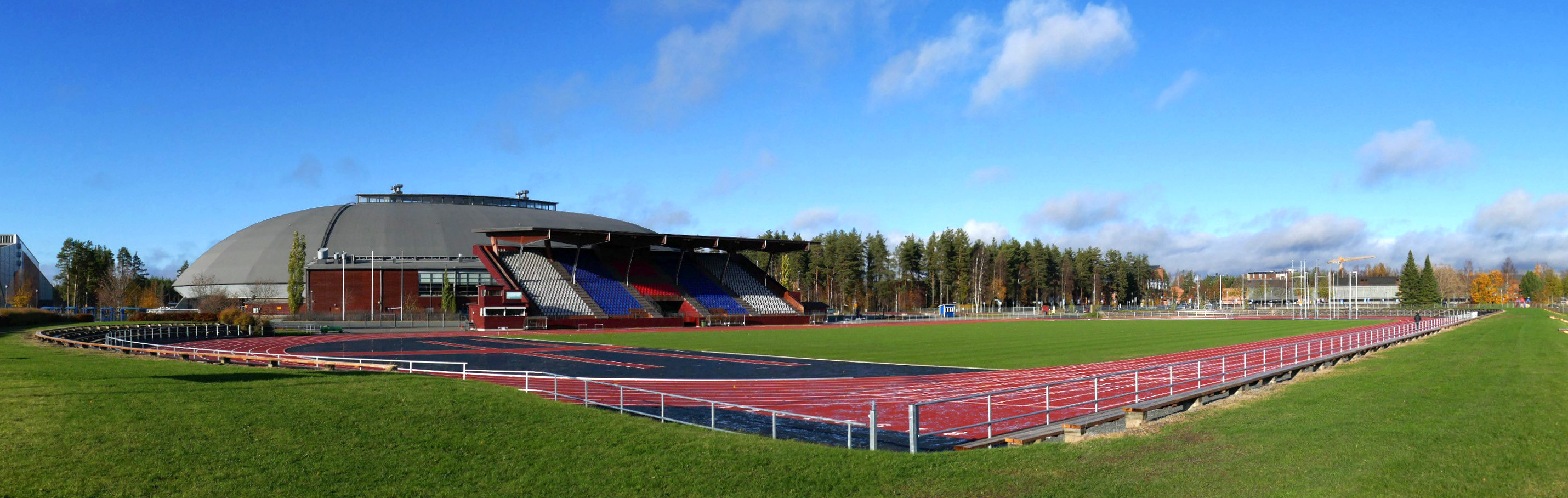
Joensuu Arena

The city is known for its basketball club Kataja, which plays in the Finnish first-tier league Korisliiga. Other professional level clubs of Joensuu include Josba (floorball), the world leading orienteering club Kalevan Rasti (orienteering) and Joen Juju (women's volleyball). The ice hockey team Joensuun Kiekko-Pojat plays in the Finnish second-tier league Mestis, and their home arena is the Mehtimäki Ice Hall. The local football club Jippo plays in the second highest level of Finnish football, Ykkösliiga. Finnish baseball enjoys popularity as well and the local team, Joensuun Maila, plays in the top division Superpesis.

Notable sportspeople from Joensuu include Jukka Keskisalo, the European champion in 2006 at the 3000m steeplechase; Aki Parviainen, the world champion of javelin throwing in 1999; biathlete Kaisa Mäkäräinen, who won three overall World Cup titles in the 2010–11, 2013–14 and 2017–18 seasons; 1983 World Rally Championship winner Hannu Mikkola; 2013 Global RallyCross Championship champion and current World RX driver Toomas Heikkinen; and National Hockey League ice hockey players Urho Vaakanainen and Juuso Riikola.

== Education ==
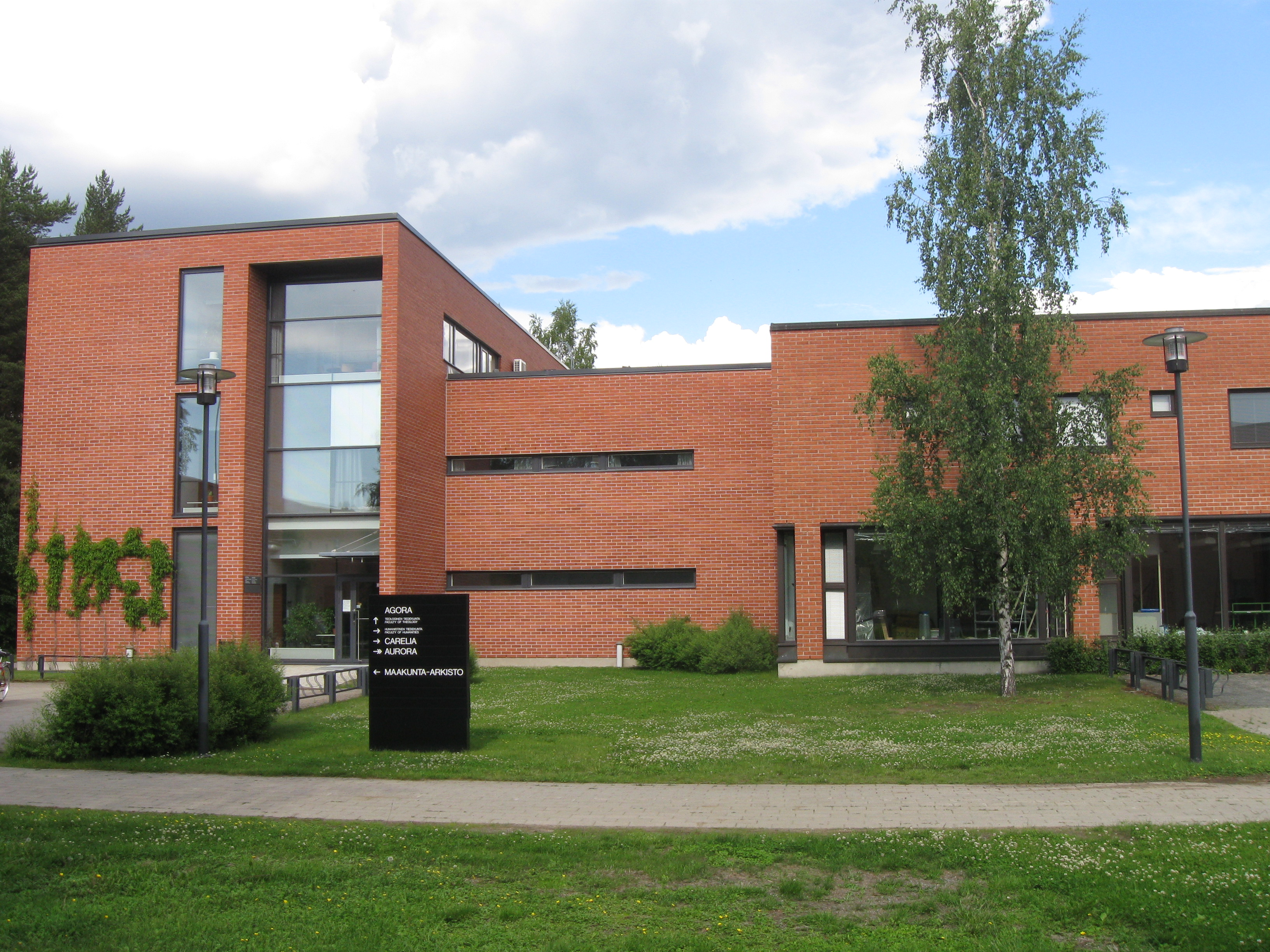
Agora building of the Joensuu campus

Joensuu is a city of students. The University of Eastern Finland (UEF) has one of its two main campuses in Joensuu and the University of Applied Sciences Karelia has two Joensuu campuses. There are also five high schools in Joensuu: Lyceum High School, Upper Secondary Normal School, Joensuu Coeducational High School, Finnish-Russian Upper Secondary School of the Eastern Finland, and Pyhäselkä High School.

There is also the Joensuu Sports Academy, which is a co-operation network of educational institutions that offers athletes training and coaching.

== Notable people ==
- Ismo Alanko (born 1960), musician
- Charli XCX lived in the city for a time
- Toomas Heikkinen (born 1991), racing driver
- Floor Jansen, Dutch singer and the lead vocalist of Nightwish, lived in Joensuu between 2014 and 2015.
- Aku Korhonen (1892−1960), actor
- Matias Laine (born 1990), racing driver
- Suvi Lindén (born 1962), politician and former Minister of Culture
- Kaisa Mäkäräinen (born 1983), 3-time world-cup-winning biathlete
- Sini Manninen (1944–2012), painter
- Hannu Mikkola (1942–2021), rally driver
- Taneli Mustonen (born 1978), film director and screenwriter
- Janne Mertanen (born 1967), pianist
- Esa Pakarinen (1911–1989), actor, singer and accordionist
- Pentti Saarikoski (1937–1983), poet and translator
- Jouko Turkka (1942–2016), theatrical director and controversialist
- Mari Turunen (born 1970), actress
- Urho Vaakanainen (born 1999), ice hockey player

== Friendship cities ==
Joensuu is twinned with:

- Linköping, Sweden (since 1940)
- Ísafjörður, Iceland (since 1948)
- Tønsberg, Norway (1948)
- Hof, Germany (since 1970)
- Vilnius, Lithuania (since 1970)
- Petrozavodsk, Russia (cooperation agreement) (since 1994)

== See also ==
- Eno, Finland
- Finnish Lake Road
- Ilosaarirock
- Öllölä
- Pielisjoki Castle
