= Pielisjoki =

River in North Karelia, Finland

Coordinates: 62°36′N 029°44′E

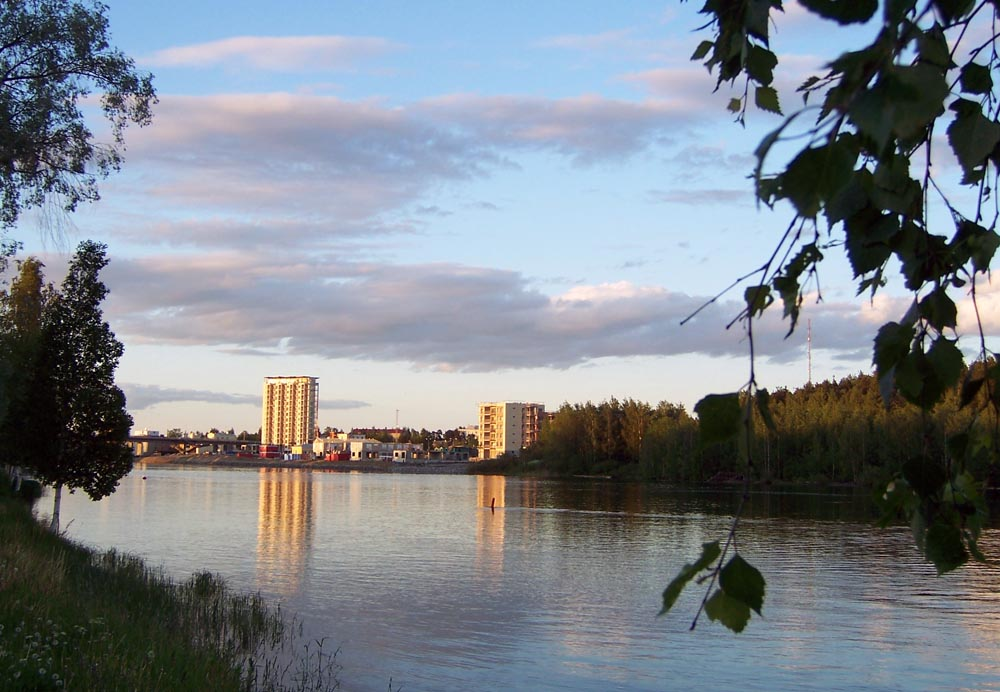

Pielisjoki (River Pielinen) is a 67-kilometre (42 mi) long river in Eastern Finland. It is the sixth most fast-flowing river in Finland and the largest river draining into Lake Saimaa. The river connects the two largest lakes in North Karelia, Pielinen and Pyhäselkä (part of Greater Saimaa). The city of Joensuu is situated at the mouth of the river.

The river was formed shortly after the last glaciation when the Uimaharju esker was broken under the pressure of Pielinen waters, which previously drained north but were redirected by tilting of the ground as a result of post-glacial land uplift.

Ten canal locks were built for navigation on the river in the late 19th century. In the 1950s and 1960s two power plants were built that block the river, Kaltimo and Kuurna. At the same time associated new canals were constructed that replaced the previous navigation system.

== See also ==
- Pielisjoki Castle
