= Maalaiskunta =

Former municipal type in Finland

The map of the former Rovaniemen maalaiskunta (in yellow) around the city centre of Rovaniemi (in red). The areas depicted in blue are areas separated from the municipality to Ranua and Posio in 1917 and 1926.

Maalaiskunta (Finnish), landskommun (Swedish), "rural municipality", abbreviated mlk, was one of the four types of municipality in Finland in 1865–1976. Other types in 1865–1959 were city (in Finnish kaupunki) and market town (in Finnish kauppala), in 1960–1976 old city (in Finnish vanha kaupunki), new city (in Finnish uusi kaupunki) and market town. Maalaiskunta was the most common type of municipality. In the 1977 reform, all municipalities were given fully equal legal standing. Previous maalaiskuntas associated with a city retained their name. For example, Rovaniemen maalaiskunta ("the rural municipality of Rovaniemi) surrounded the city of Rovaniemi, but were independently governed. From 2009, no municipalities carried this name any more, after the merger of Jyväskylä and Jyväskylän mlk.

Rural municipalities were legally independent from the cities carrying the same name. However, in some cases, particularly when the city was in the geographic center of the municipality, rural municipalities placed their offices in the city, on the territory of a different municipality. Rural municipalities have also changed their names to create an identity distinct from the city. For example, Vantaa was previously known as Helsingin maalaiskunta, as it was the historical center of Helsinki (location of the Helsinki church village).

In addition, in 1926 Lohja was split into Lohjan maalaiskunta, which was known as Lohjan kunta after 1977, and Lohjan kauppala (later Lohjan kaupunki), but the two merged again in 1997.

== List of municipalities explicitly named maalaiskunta ==
- Ekenäs landskommun (in Finnish Tammisaaren maalaiskunta)
  - attached in 1977 with Snappertuna as Ekenäs town
- Heinolan maalaiskunta
  - attached to Heinola in 1997
- Helsingin maalaiskunta (the Swedish name was Helsinge without the word landskommun)
  - got the rights of market town in 1972 name changed to Vantaa
- Hyvinkään maalaiskunta
  - attached in 1969 to Hyvinkää
- Hämeenlinnan maalaiskunta
  - attached in 1948 to Hämeenlinna, Vanaja and Renko
- Iisalmen maalaiskunta
  - attached in 1970 to Iisalmi
- Ikaalisten maalaiskunta
  - united in 1972 with Ikaalinen
- Jyväskylän maalaiskunta
  - last municipality with the word maalaiskunta attached in 2009 to Jyväskylä
- Kajaanin maalaiskunta
  - attached in 1977 to Kajaani
- Karis landskommun (in Finnish Karjaan maalaiskunta)
  - attached in 1969 to Karis
- Kemijärven maalaiskunta
  - united in 1973 with Kemijärvi market town and formed as Kemijärvi town
- Kemin maalaiskunta
  - name changed to Keminmaa in 1980
- Koiviston maalaiskunta
  - territorial loss to Soviet Union in 1944
- Kokkolan maalaiskunta
  - changed name to Kaarlela in 1927, attached to Kokkola in 1977.
- Kristinestads landskommun (in Finnish Kristiinankaupungin maalaiskunta)
  - changed name to Tjöck in 1919, attached to Kristinestad in 1973.
- Kuopion maalaiskunta
  - attached in 1969 to Kuopio and Siilinjärvi
- Käkisalmen maalaiskunta
  - territorial loss to Soviet Union in 1944
- Lohjan maalaiskunta (in Swedish Lojo landskommun)
  - name changed to Lohjan kunta ("municipality of Lohja") in 1977, attached to the city of Lohja in 1997.
- Loimaan maalaiskunta
  - name changed Loimaan kunta ("municipality of Loimaa") in 1977, attached to the city of Loimaa in 2005
- Mikkelin maalaiskunta
  - attached in 2001 to Mikkeli
- Naantalin maalaiskunta
  - attached in 1964 to Naantali
- Nurmeksen maalaiskunta
  - attached in 1973 to Nurmes market town
- Nykarleby landskommun (in Finnish Uudenkaarlepyyn maalaiskunta)
  - attached in 1975 with Munsala and Jeppo as Nykarleby town
- Oulun maalaiskunta
  - name changed as Oulujoki in 1910, and annexed in 1965 with Haukipudas, Kempele, Kiiminki, Oulu, Oulunsalo, Tyrnävä, Utajärvi and Ylikiiminki
- Pargas landskommun (in Finnish Paraisten maalaiskunta)
  - attached in 1967 to Pargas market town
- Pieksämäen maalaiskunta
  - united in 2004 with Jäppilä and Virtasalmi as Pieksänmaa, which merged with Pieksämäki in 2007
- Pedersöre (in Finnish former Pietarsaaren maalaiskunta)
  - the Finnish name changed as Pedersören kunta in 1989, the Swedish name was always Pedersöre without the word landskommun
- Porin maalaiskunta
  - attached in 1967 to Pori
- Porvoon maalaiskunta (in Swedish Borgå landskommun)
  - attached in 1997 to Porvoo
- Rauman maalaiskunta
  - attached in 1993 to Rauma
- Rovaniemen maalaiskunta
  - attached in 2006 to Rovaniemi
- Seinäjoen maalaiskunta
  - attached in 1959 to Seinäjoki market town
- Sortavalan maalaiskunta
  - territorial loss in 1944 to Soviet Union
- Uudenkaupungin maalaiskunta
  - attached in 1969 to Uusikaupunki
- Viipurin maalaiskunta
  - territorial loss in 1944 to Soviet Union
- Äänekosken maalaiskunta
  - attached in 1969 to Äänekoski market town.
