= Mikkeli Province =

Province of Finland (1831–1997)

Coordinates: 61.6875°N 27.2736°E

Mikkeli Province Mikkelin lääni S:t Michels län
- Province of Finland
- 1831–1997
- Coat of arms
- Capital: Mikkeli
- Area
  - Coordinates
  - 1.1.1993: 21,628 km^{2} (8,351 sq mi)
- Population
  - 1.1.1993: 207,967
- History
  - Established: 1831
  - Disestablished: 1997
| Preceded by | Succeeded by |
| County of Kymmenegård | Eastern Finland Province |

The Mikkeli Province (Finnish: Mikkelin lääni, Swedish: S:t Michels län) was a province of Finland from 1831 to 1997. The province was named after the city of Mikkeli.

Under Russian rule, it was called Saint Michel Governorate. Parts of the province were transferred to the Central Finland Province in 1960. In 1997 it was merged with Kuopio Province and Northern Karelia Province into the new Eastern Finland Province.

== Maps ==
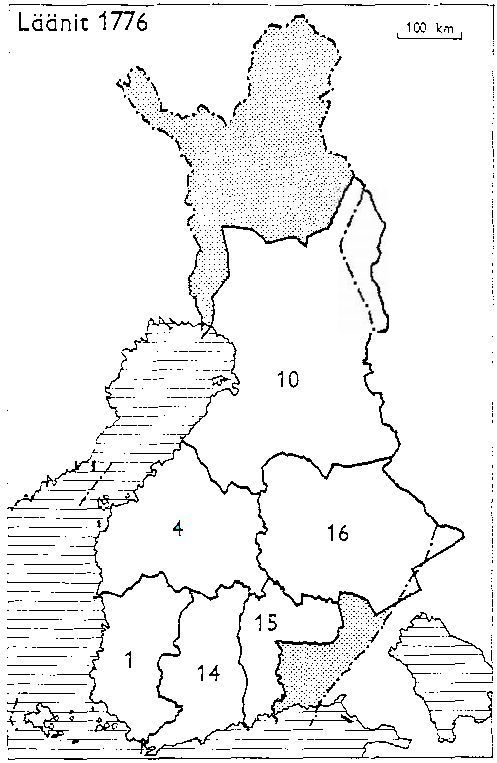
Provinces of Finland 1776: 1: Turku and Pori, 4: Vaasa, 10: Oulu, 14: Nyland and Tavastehus, 15: Kymmenegård, 16: Savolax and Karelia

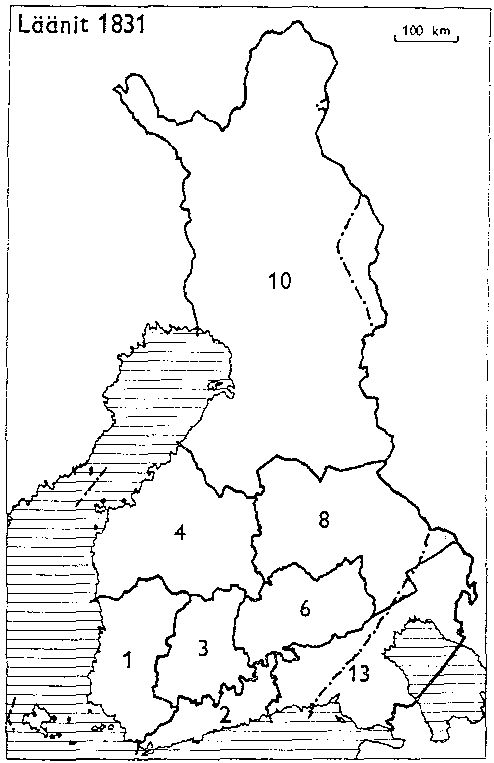
Provinces of Finland 1831: 1: Turku and Pori, 2: Uusimaa, 3: Häme, 4: Vaasa, 6: Mikkeli, 8: Kuopio, 10: Oulu, 13: Viipuri

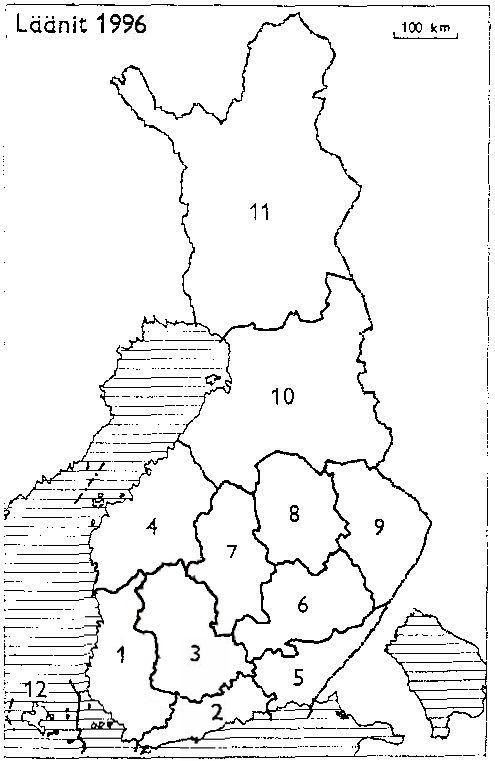
Provinces of Finland 1996: 1: Turku and Pori, 2: Uusimaa, 3: Häme, 4: Vaasa, 5: Kymi, 6: Mikkeli, 7: Central Finland, 8: Kuopio, 9: Northern Karelia, 10: Oulu, 11: Lapland, 12: Åland

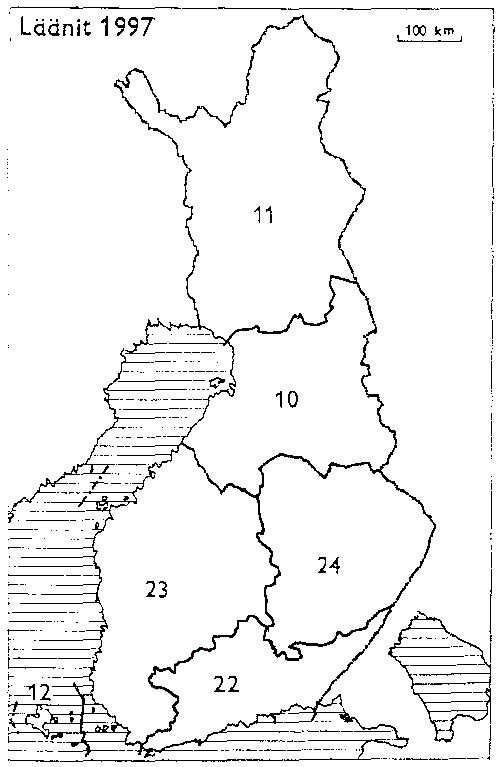
Provinces of Finland 1997: 10: Oulu, 11: Lapland, 12: Åland, 22: Southern Finland, 23: Western Finland, 24: Eastern Finland

== Municipalities in 1997 (cities in bold) ==
- Anttola
- Enonkoski
- Hartola
- Haukivuori
- **Heinola**
- Heinävesi
- Hirvensalmi
- Joroinen
- Juva
- Jäppilä
- Kangaslampi
- Kangasniemi
- Kerimäki
- **Mikkeli**
- Mikkelin mlk
- Mäntyharju
- Pertunmaa
- **Pieksämäki**
- Pieksämäen mlk
- Punkaharju
- Puumala
- Rantasalmi
- Ristiina
- **Savonlinna**
- Savonranta
- Sulkava
- Sysmä
- Virtasalmi

== Former municipalities (disestablished before 1997) ==
- Heinolan mlk
- Sääminki

== Governors ==
- Abraham Joakim Molander-Nordenheim 1831–1837
- Gabriel Anton Cronstedt 1837–1840
- Otto Abraham Boije 1840–1847
- Alexander Thesleff 1847–1853
- Carl Fabian Langenskiöld 1853–1854
- Carl Emil Cedercreutz 1854–1856
- Bernhard Indrenius 1856
- Samuel Werner von Troil 1856–1863
- Theodor Sebastian Gustaf Thilén 1863–1869
- Carl Gustav Mortimer von Kraemer 1869–1873
- Edvard Reinhold von Ammondt 1874–1875
- Hjalmar Sebastian Nordenstreng 1876–1883
- August Alexander Järnefelt 1883–1884
- Gustav Axel Samuel von Troil 1884–1889
- Johannes Gripenberg 1889–1891
- Knut Robert Carl Walfrid Spåre 1891–1899
- Lennart Fritiof Munck 1900–1903
- Aleksander Watatzi 1903–1905
- Anton Leonard von Knorring 1905–1910
- Eliel Ilmari Vuorinen 1910–1911
- Leo Aristides Sirelius 1911–1916
- Nikolai Sillman 1916–1917
- Aleksanteri August Aho 1917
- Ernst Edvard Rosenqvist 1918–1927
- Albin Pulkkinen 1927–1933
- Emil Jatkola 1933–1948
- Alpo Lumme 1949–1957
- Urho Kiukas 1957–1970
- Viljo Virtanen 1970–1979
- Uki Voutilainen 1979–1989
- Juhani Kortesalmi 1989–1997
