= Motopark Raceway =

Motor racing track in Pieksämäki, Finland

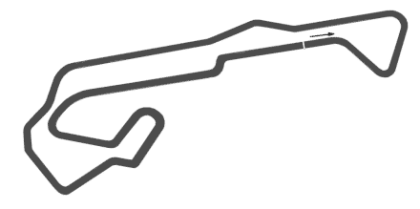
- Full Circuit (1987–present)
- Location: Pieksämäki, Finland
- Coordinates: 62°03′18.47″N 27°33′19.04″E
- Broke ground: 1987
- Opened: June 1987; 39 years ago (as drag raceway); 1993 (as race circuit)
- Major events: Current: Finnish Road Racing Championship (1998–present); Former: Imatranajo (1993–2014); Finnish Formula Three Championship (2002–2003); Finnish Touring Car Championship (1997, 2002–2003)
- Website: https://www.motopark.fi/

Full Circuit (1993–present)
- Length: 3.516 km (2.185 mi)
- Turns: 17
- Race lap record: 1:22.139 ( (Finland) Aki Rask, Dallara F394, 2002, F3)

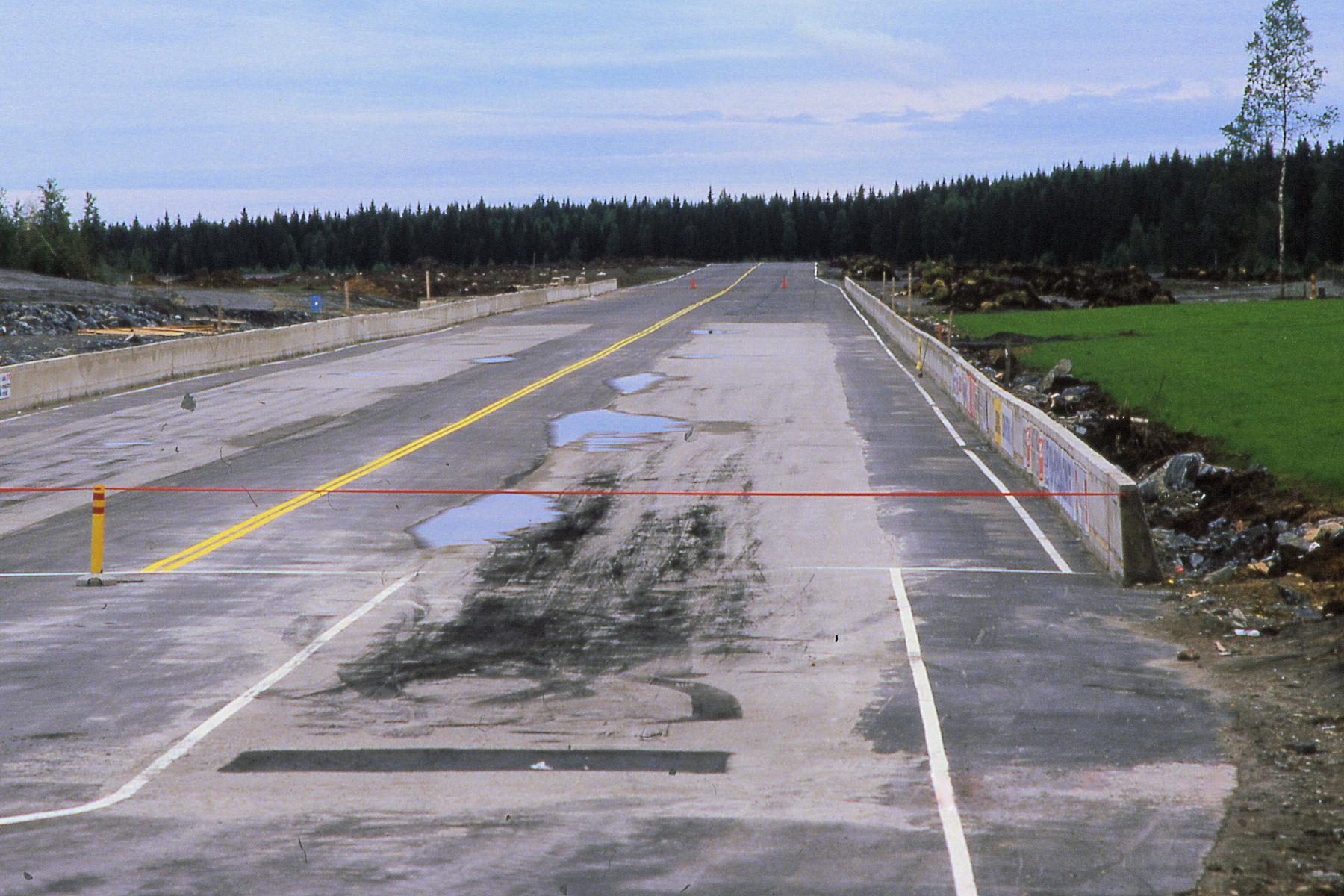
Motopark Raceway, drag racing strip

The Motopark Raceway is a motorsport venue in Eastern Finland, Virtasalmi, Pieksämäki municipality. The track has length of 3.516 km (2.185 mi). long and is surrounded by 3.000 km (1.864 mi) of rallycross track. The area also includes a 402.33 m (1,320.0 ft) drag racing strip.

The track was opened in 1987 as drag raceway and was the first motor stadium in Finland meant only for drag racing. The stadium area was enlarged in 1990s, when asphalt and rallycross tracks were constructed, in which the road course was opened in 1993.

== Lap records ==
As of June 2023, the fastest official race lap records at the Motopark Raceway are listed as:

Category	Time	Driver	Vehicle	Event
Full Circuit (1993–present): 3.516 km (2.185 mi)
F3	1:22.139	Aki Rask	Dallara F394	2002 Virtasalmi Finnish F3 round
Superbikes	1:23.983	Niki Tuuli	Kawasaki Ninja ZX-10R	2023 Virtasalmi Finnish Superbike round

== See also ==
- Motorcycle racing
