= Eastern Finland Province =

Coordinates: 62°N 28°E

Eastern Finland Itä-Suomen lääni Östra Finlands län
- Coat of arms

- Country: Finland
- Established: September 1, 1997
- Abolished: January 1, 2010
- Capital: Mikkeli
- Largest city: Kuopio

Government
  - Governor: Pirjo Ala-Kapee

Area
  - Total: 48,726 km^{2} (18,813 sq mi)

Population (December 31, 2009)
  - Total: 569,832
  - Density: 11.695/km^{2} (30.289/sq mi)
- Time zone: UTC+2 (EET)
  - Summer (DST): UTC+3 (EEST)
- ISO 3166 code: IS
- NUTS code: 13

Eastern Finland (Finnish: Itä-Suomen lääni, Swedish: Östra Finlands län) was a province of Finland from 1997 to 2009. It bordered the provinces of Oulu, Western Finland and Southern Finland. It also bordered Russia to the east.

== History ==
On September 1, 1997, the Mikkeli Province, the Kuopio Province and Northern Karelia Province were joined to form the new Eastern Finland Province.

All the provinces of Finland were abolished on January 1, 2010.

== Administration ==
The State Provincial Office was a joint regional authority of seven different ministries. It promoted national and regional objectives of the State central administration. Eastern Finland State Provincial Office had branch offices in Mikkeli, Joensuu, and Kuopio.

== Subdivisions ==
At the time of its abolition, the Province of Eastern Finland was composed of three regions:

- North Karelia (Pohjois-Karjala / Norra Karelen)
- North Savo (Pohjois-Savo / Norra Savolax)
- South Savo (Etelä-Savo / Södra Savolax)

These regions were further divided into a total of 11 subregions and 54 municipalities. In the list below, the municipalities that designate themselves as cities or towns (Finnish: kaupunki, Swedish: stad) are shown in bold.

=== North Karelia ===
==== Joensuu sub-region ====
- Ilomantsi (Ilomants)
- **Joensuu**
- Juuka (Juga)
- Kontiolahti (Kontiolax)
- Liperi (Libelits)
- **Outokumpu**
- Polvijärvi
- Heinävesi

==== Central Karelia ====
- Kesälahti
- **Kitee** (Kides)
- Rääkkylä
- Tohmajärvi

==== Pielinen Karelia ====
- **Lieksa**
- **Nurmes**
- Valtimo

=== North Savo ===
==== Upper Savo ====
- **Iisalmi** (Idensalmi)
- Keitele
- **Kiuruvesi**
- Lapinlahti
- Pielavesi
- Sonkajärvi
- Varpaisjärvi
- Vieremä

==== Kuopio sub-region ====
- Karttula
- **Kuopio**
- Maaninka
- Siilinjärvi

==== Northeast Savo ====
- **Juankoski**
- Kaavi
- **Nilsiä**
- Rautavaara
- Tuusniemi

==== Varkaus sub-region ====
- Kangaslampi
- Leppävirta
- **Varkaus**
- Joroinen (Jorois)

==== Inner Savo ====
- Rautalampi
- **Suonenjoki**
- Tervo
- Vesanto

=== South Savo ===
==== Mikkeli sub-region ====
- Hirvensalmi
- Kangasniemi
- **Mikkeli** (S:t Michel)
- Mäntyharju
- Pertunmaa
- Ristiina (Kristina)
- Puumala

==== Pieksämäki sub-region ====
- **Pieksämäki**
- Juva

==== Savonlinna sub-region ====
- Enonkoski
- Kerimäki
- Punkaharju
- Rantasalmi
- **Savonlinna** (Nyslott)
- Sulkava

== Former municipalities (disestablished before 2009) ==
- Anttola
- Eno
- Haukivuori
- Jäppilä
- Kangaslampi
- Kiihtelysvaara
- Mikkelin mlk
- Pieksämäen mlk
- Pieksänmaa
- Pyhäselkä
- Savonranta
- Tuupovaara
- Vehmersalmi
- Virtasalmi
- Värtsilä

== Governors ==
- Pirjo Ala-Kapee 1997–2009

== Heraldry ==
The coat of arms of Eastern Finland was composed of the arms of Savo and Karelia.
