= Mikkelin maalaiskunta =

- Former municipality
- Mikkelin maalaiskunta Sankt Michels landskommun
- Coat of arms

- Location of Mikkelin mlk in Finland
- Coordinates: 61.6776222°N 27.2021317°E
- Country: Finland
- Province: Mikkeli Province / Eastern Finland Province
- Region: South Savo
- Established: 1323 / 17th century
- Merged into Mikkeli: 2001
- Seat: Rantakylä

Area
  - Land: 972.7 km^{2} (375.6 sq mi)

Population (2000-12-31)
  - Total: 11,988

Mikkelin maalaiskunta (abbreviated Mikkelin mlk, Swedish: Sankt Michels landskommun) is a former municipality of Finland located in the modern region of South Savo. Together with Anttola, it was consolidated with the town of Mikkeli in 2001.

== Geography ==
The municipality surrounded the town of Mikkeli. It also bordered Juva, Anttola, Ristiina, Hirvensalmi, Kangasniemi, Haukivuori and Virtasalmi.

=== Villages ===
- Alamaa
- Anianniemi
- Asila
- Haahkala
- Haapataipale
- Harjujärvi
- Harjumaa
- Haukkakorhola
- Häyrylä
- Heinälahti
- Helppanala
- Hiirola
- Hyyrylä
- Ihastjärvi
- Kaipiala
- Karstula
- Kirkonkylä (town of Mikkeli 1838)
- Korpijärvi
- Koskentaipale
- Kovala
- Kyyhkylänniemi
- Laitiala
- Laurikkala
- Liukkola (later Otava)
- Marjoniemi
- Moisio
- Närvälä
- Norola
- Olkkolanniemi
- Pajula
- Parantala
- Parkkila
- Pekkola
- Puttola
- Rahula
- Rämälä
- Rantakylä
- Rieppola
- Riittilä
- Sairila
- Salmenkylä
- Savonlahti
- Seppälä
- Soikkala
- Suonsaari
- Taipale
- Tikkala
- Tuukkala
- Vanhala
- Vanhamäki
- Vatila
- Vehmaskylä
- Viljakkala
- Visulahti
- Vuolinko
- Väänälä
- Väärälä

== History ==
Expansion of the town of Mikkeli.

During the late Viking Age, the area was inhabited by Tavastians. A Karelian migration to the area occurred in the 12th century. The Savonian people formed out of these two groups as well as the possibly Sámic-speaking indigenous population.

The initial settlement in the area was known as Savilahti, established in the late 13th century. It was originally part of the Novgorod Republic until the 1323 Treaty of Oreshek, when Novgorod ceded it to Sweden along with Jääski and Äyräpää. Savilahti was the first parish in all of Savonia, all other Savonian parishes were separated from it directly or indirectly, the first one being Juva in 1442/1460.

In the early 16th century, the Savilahti parish was divided into two administrative areas: Visulahti (Vesulahti) and Pellosniemi, both first mentioned in 1541. The parish of Haukivuori was separated from Savilahti (Visulahti) and Juva in 1573, but the parish was soon renamed Pieksämä (Pieksämäki) in 1577. Haukivuori only became a parish center again in 1873.

The name Mikkeli for the parish first appears in 17th century documents after the church dedicated to Archangel Michael. The administrative division of Visulahti was renamed Mikkeli in 1664, but Visulahti was still occasionally used until the 1680s. Ristiina was separated in 1649. In 1838, the town of Mikkeli was established in the main village of the parish. Three more parishes were separated from the Mikkeli parish: Hirvensalmi in 1851, followed by Anttola in 1872 (administratively 1875). The last one was Mikkeli's town parish in 1908.

The municipality was consolidated with the town of Mikkeli in 2001 alongside Anttola.

== Services ==
=== Education ===
The Otava Folk High School (Otavan opisto) is located in the village of Otava.
