= Jukajärvi =

Lake in the country of Finland

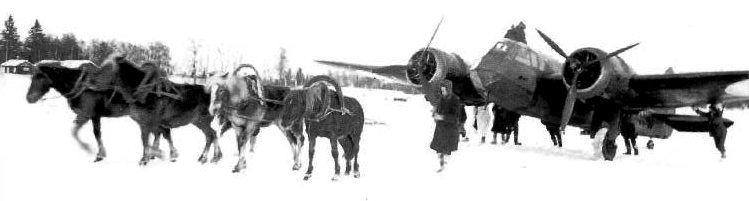
- Bristol Blenheim light bomber landed on the frozen lake during the Winter War.

- Location within Finland
- Location: Southern Savonia
- Coordinates: 61°53′04″N 27°51′36″E
- Basin countries: Finland
- Max. length: 7 km (4.3 mi)
- Surface area: 9.03 km^{2} (3.49 sq mi)
- Max. depth: 15 m (49 ft)
- Settlements: Juva

Jukajärvi is a lake in the Finnish municipality of Juva located in the province of Eastern Finland. It covers an area of 9.2 km^{2} in the Southern Savonia. The lake has the maximum length of 7 km.

In Eastern Finland there are several lakes with the same name.
