= Tommi Nakari =

Convicted Finnish serial killer

- Born: Tommi Taneli Nakari; 1967 (age 58–59); Mikkeli, Finland
- Convictions: Manslaughter; Murder x2
- Penalty: 12.4 years, commuted to 8 years (first murder); 10.8 years (second murder); 14.5 years (third murder)

Details
- Victims: 3
- Span of crimes: 1992–2008
- Country: Finland
- State: South Savo
- Date apprehended: For the final time in March 2009

Tommi Taneli Nakari (born 1967) is a Finnish serial killer who killed two common-law wives and his mother between 1992 and 2008. For the final crime, he was convicted of manslaughter and sentenced to 14.5 years imprisonment, despite his claims that he could not remember committing any of the murders.

== Murders ==
=== First murder ===
On 17 August 1992, Tommi and his common-law wife decided to go on a trip to Helsinki, since they had recently retrieved their unemployment benefits. Instead, they ended up in Pieksämäki, where they spent the night drinking alcohol with friends in various drinking establishments. When the bars closed down, the couple started their journey back home to Mikkeli, since none of their friends were at home.

At the train station, they came across an ex-convict who was also en route to Mikkeli. For an undisclosed reason, Nakari and his wife began arguing, resulting in the former walking away without his wife and sleeping the night off in a nearby grill bar. On the following morning, in an attempt to cure his hangover, Nakari began to drink large amounts of beer, which was combined with a bottle of Lorazepam. He managed to stumble back to his house, as he was worried about his wife. He found her there, with his wife explaining that she had been released from custody on the night before.

Nakari did not believe her explanation, and began chewing down on various medical pills he had lying in his home. His wife began scolding him for it, and in the heat of the moment, Nakari picked up a long-bladed knife and stabbed his wife ten times with brutal force, so much so that the knife pierced through her body to the other side. As a finishing blow, he also cut her throat. He then covered the body up with cloths and towels, before falling asleep.

After a few days passed, Nakari regained consciousness, unable to remember what had happened. He entered the bedroom, only to find that the walls were splattered in blood and his wife's body sprawled on the floor. Realizing that he had killed her, Nakari attempted suicide by slicing his wrists, but the bleeding stopped, prompting him to wash it off in the bathtub. He then attempted to hang himself in the wardrobe, but again failed.

Nakari then left the city, spending the rest of the week binging on alcohol and drugs, keeping the homicide a secret. He was eventually detained by police and brought back to his apartment, where authorities found the decomposing body of his wife. Nakari was then brought to the Health Care Legal Security Center, where he was diagnosed with a personality disorder. Taking this diagnosis into account, the court commuted his initial sentence of 12.4 years to 8 years.

=== Second murder ===
In the autumn of 1998, Nakari was released from prison and returned to his mother's home. Several months later, the two got into an argument over cleaning, and in a drunken rage, Nakari began punching his mother, knocking her to the ground. He then grabbed a kitchen knife and scissors, with which he stabbed his mother in the neck and face 19 times. Like with the previous murder, he dragged the body to the washroom, where he covered it up with cloths and towels.

When he was arrested, Nakari again claimed that he did not remember anything. In response to this murder, the Mikkeli District Court was sentenced to 10.8 years in prison.

=== Third murder ===
After his release in June 2006, Nakari again returned to Mikkeli, where he later met 26-year-old Anna-Emilia Simniceanu from Jyväskylä. Despite warnings from her family and friends about her new boyfriend's past, Simniceanu continued to go out with him, and the couple even planned a holiday trip to India in the winter of 2008.

On 10 January 2008, the couple rented a summer cottage in Mikkeli, where they planned to visit Nakari's relatives. However, on the way, the two got into an argument, with Nakari pulling out a knife and grazing Simniceanu on the arm while driving. When they reached the cottage, he renewed his attack, managing to incapacitate Simniceanu. After she fell to the ground, he strangled her and then left the body lying in the yard.

After she failed to get back to her parents, they alerted the police in Jyväskylä, who in turn requested assistance from the Mikkeli police. On 15 January, Simniceanu's body was found in the cottage's yard, but Nakari was nowhere to be seen. An arrest warrant was issued for him, with him remaining on the run until March, when he was arrested by police in Kuopio without incident. He was brought to trial, and in 2009, he was sentenced to 14.5 years imprisonment, in addition to paying 16,000 euros in reparations to the family. The sentence was automatically appealed, but later upheld by the Eastern Finland Court.

== See also ==
- List of serial killers by country
