= Pothook =

Implement for suspending a pot over fire

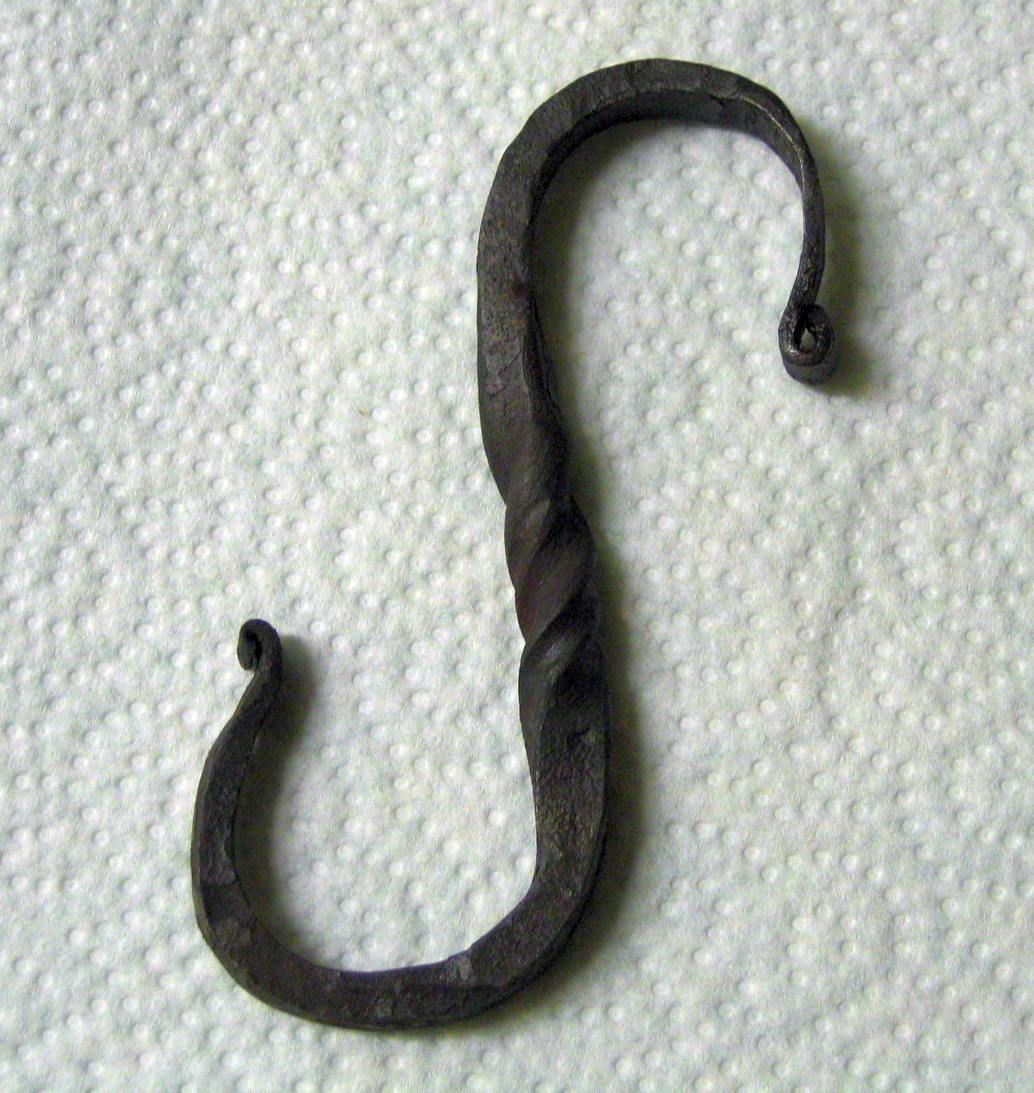
A metal pothook

A pothook (or pot hook) is an S-shaped metal hook for suspending a pot over a fire.

== Usage ==
While one extremity of the pothook is hooked to the handle of the pot, the other is caught upon an iron crane moving on a pivot over the fire. Later stoves obviated the necessity for this arrangement, but in the early twentieth century it was still to be seen in great numbers of country cottages and farmhouse kitchens all over England, and in small artisan's houses in the West Midlands and the North.

== Writing ==
In the elementary teaching of writing, a glyph of similar shape is called a pothook.

== Gallery ==
A wooden camp cooking pot hook

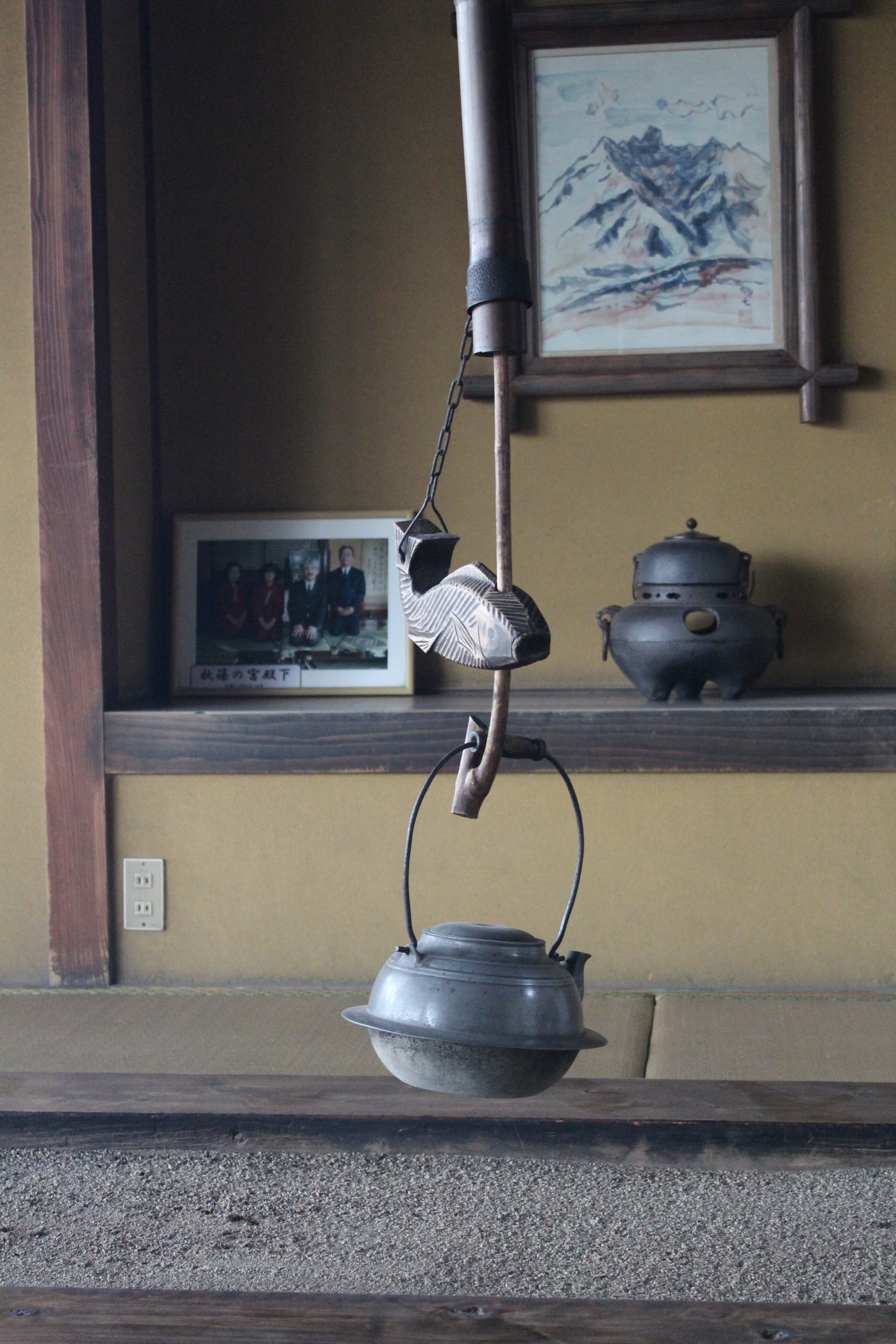
A Japanese Irori with Jizaikagi

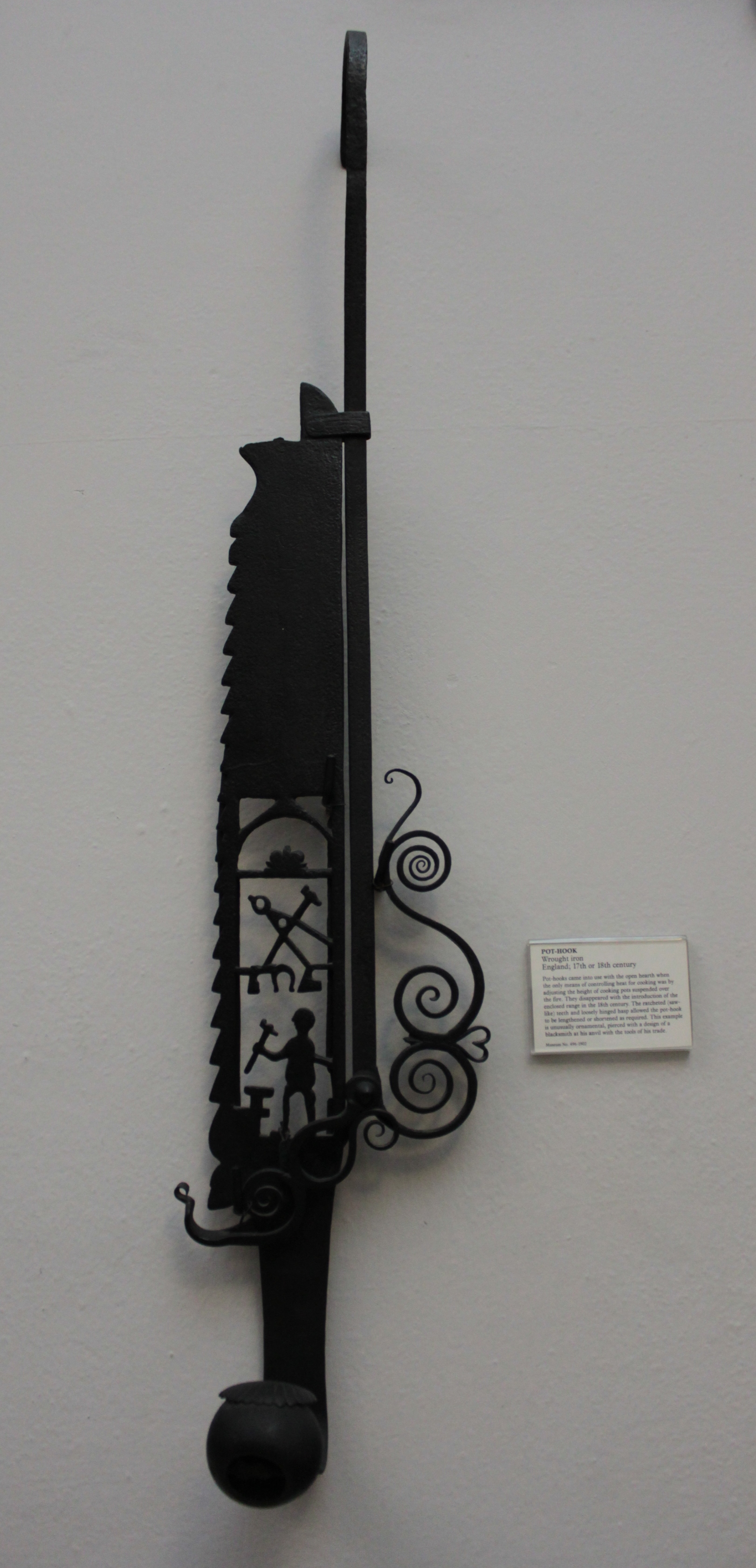
A wrought iron pot hook

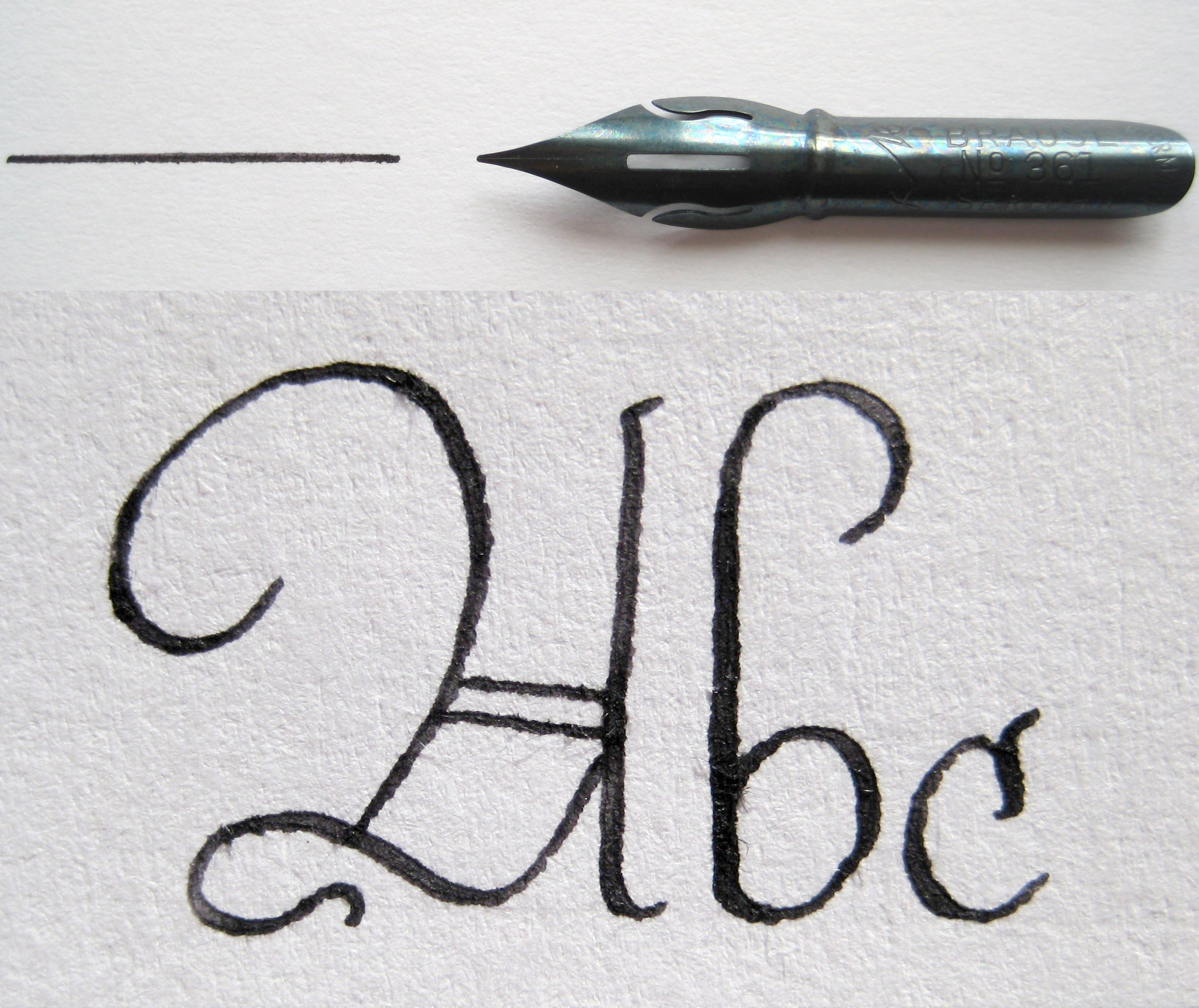
A steel nib with a sample of writing (A b c: the ascender of the "b" is an example of a pothook)

Pothook pictured in the coat of arms of Jäppilä

== See also ==
- Trammel hook
