= Anttola =

- Former municipality
- Anttolan kunta Anttola kommun
- Coat of arms

- Location of Anttola in Finland
- Coordinates: 61.5837869°N 27.6445491°E
- Country: Finland
- Province: Mikkeli Province / Eastern Finland Province
- Region: South Savo
- Established: 1875
- Merged into Mikkeli: 2001
- Seat: Anttolankylä

Area
  - Land: 257.2 km^{2} (99.3 sq mi)

Population (2000-12-31)
  - Total: 1,868

Anttola is a village and a former municipality of Finland located in the modern region of South Savo. Together with Mikkelin maalaiskunta, it was consolidated with the town of Mikkeli in 2001.

== Geography ==
The village of Anttola is located between Paljavesi and Luonteri, a part of Saimaa.

=== Villages ===
- Anttola (Anttolankylä)
- Hauhala
- Huttula
- Kääriälä
- Kähkölä
- Maljala
- Montola
- Nurhola
- Piskola
- Pitkälahti
- Pulkkila
- Ruokola
- Siiskola
- Ylivesi

== History ==
The name of Anttola is derived from the Savonian surname Anttonen, first attested in the area in 1541. It was a part of the Pitkälahti fourth of the Pellosniemi parish after the original Savilahti (later Mikkeli) parish was divided in the early 16th century.

Expansion of Mikkeli.

In 1608, Anttola was given to the Russian boyar Menshik Baranoff, who established a seat farm (Swedish: säteri) in the area. Menshik died in 1625, after which his property was inherited by his son Klaus Johan Baranoff, who later fought in the Battle of Lund in 1676. The Anttola manor was first mentioned in 1639.

Since the 17th century, there had been multiple propositions to build a chapel or a church in Anttola caused by Anttola's distance from the parish's center. Anttola eventually became a chapel community in 1867, also acquiring territories from Juva, Ristiina and Puumala. The old wooden church of Juva was relocated to Anttola in 1870.

Anttola became a separate parish in 1872 and a municipality in 1875. At the time, it had a population of 2,112. At its peak, Anttola had over 3,000 inhabitants. By the late 20th century, it had decreased to under 2,000. In order to avoid financial difficulties, Anttola joined the town of Mikkeli in 2001 together with Mikkelin maalaiskunta.

== Church ==
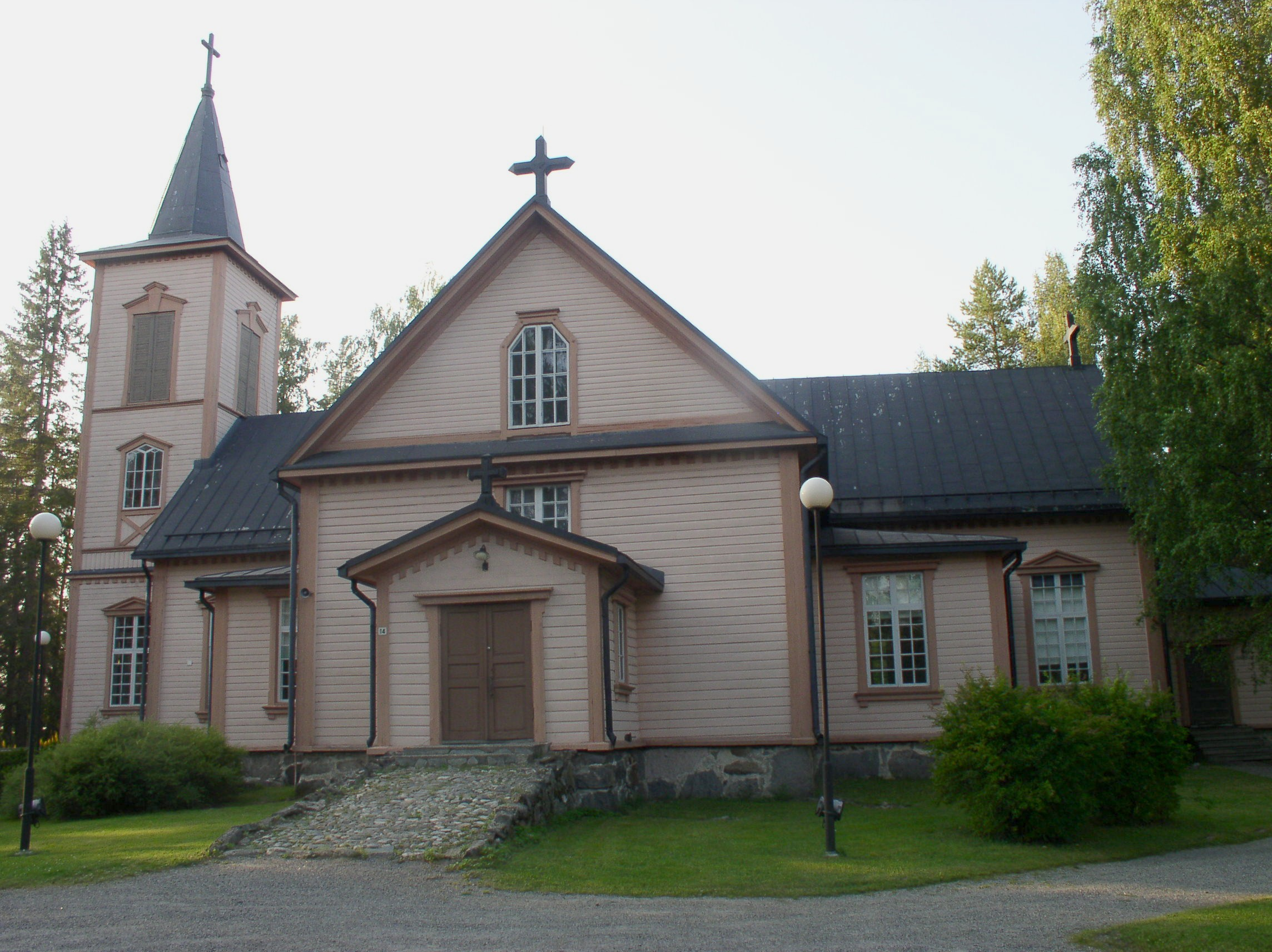

Anttola's church was built in Juva in 1729. The parish of Juva donated the church to Anttola in 1780, as there was a newer stone church built for Juva in 1863. The pulpit and the altar wall's crucifix are remnants of Juva's older church from the 1660s. Originally the altar wall had an altarpiece donated by the Mikkeli parish, depicting Mary Magdalene next to Christ's cross. The altarpiece can now be seen in the congregation hall.

== Services ==
=== School ===
Anttola has a united school for grades 1-6 (ala-aste) and 7-9 (yläaste). The current facility was built in 2020.

=== Travel ===
The Anttolanhovi hotel (now called Saimaanranta Resort) is located on the shore of the Paljavesi near the Anttola manor.
