= Ano Turtiainen =

Finnish politician (born 1967)

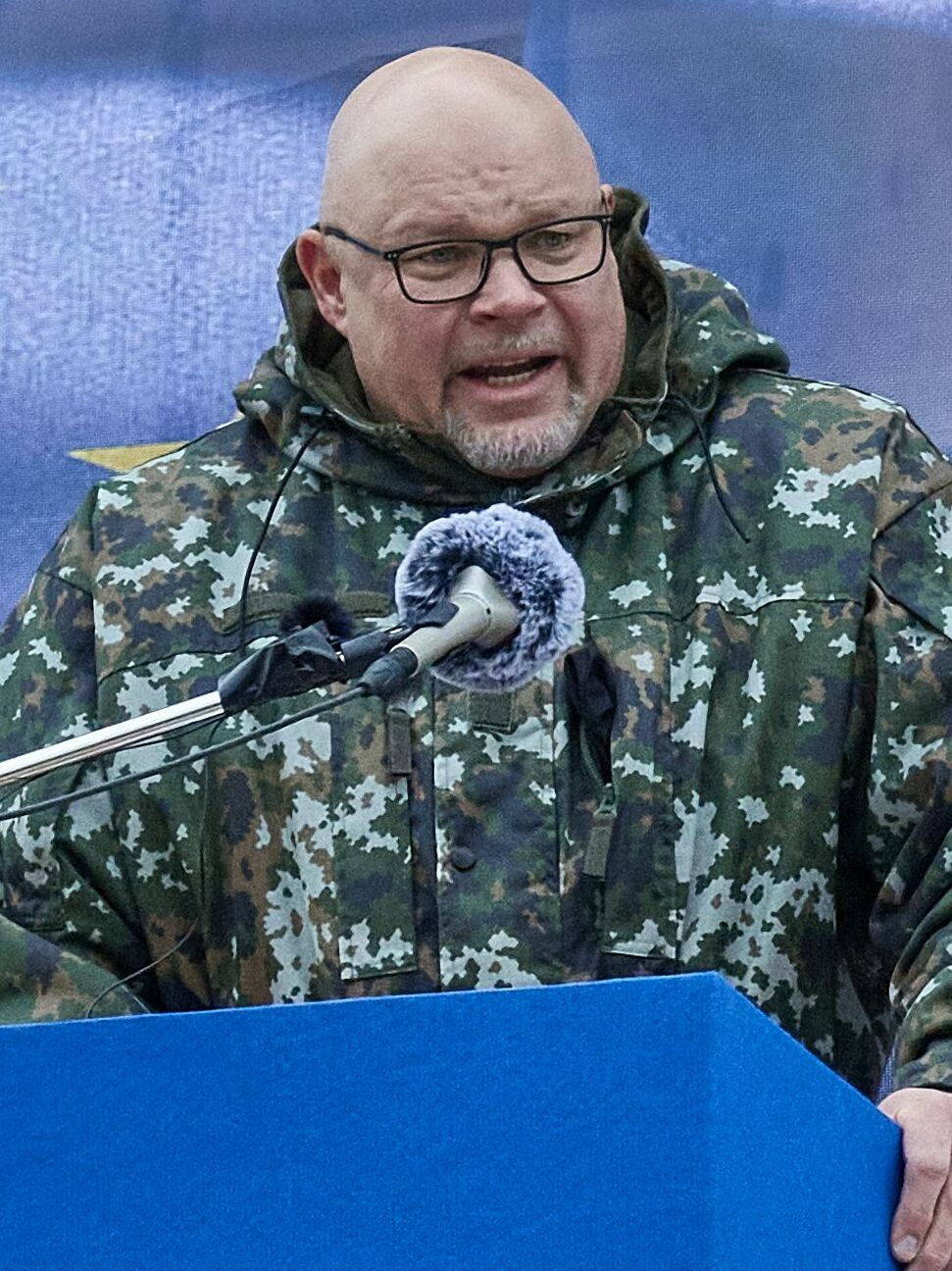
- Turtiainen in 2020

Member of the Finnish Parliament for South-Eastern Finland
- In office April 17, 2019 – April 4, 2023

Personal details
- Born: Ano Veli Samuel Turtiainen; 25 August 1967 (age 59) Sääminki, Mikkeli Province, Finland
- Party: Finns (2019–2020); Power Belongs to the People (2021–2023; renamed from Eduskuntaryhmä Ano Turtiainen from 2020–2021)
- Education: Wärtsilä Vocational School
- Occupation: Entrepreneur, MP

Ano Veli Samuel Turtiainen (born 25 August 1967) is a Finnish former powerlifter and far-right politician who served in the Parliament of Finland for the South-Eastern Finland constituency from 2019 to 2023. He is also founder and former leader of the Power Belongs to the People party. Turtiainen was elected to the parliament in the 2019 parliamentary election. Turtiainen was expelled from the Finns Party for posting a tweet perceived as mocking the murder of George Floyd in February 2021. He lived in Juva until 2025 before moving to Russia.

== Sports career ==
Turtiainen competed for the International Powerlifting Federation, World Powerlifting Congress and World Powerlifting Organization. In 1998, Turtiainen was tested positive for androgenic drugs and banned for two years. In 2002, he set a deadlift world record 405.5 kg for WPC.

== Political career ==
In 2017, Turtiainen was elected into municipal council of Juva in Southern Savonia as a representative of the Finns Party.

In the 2019 parliamentary election, Turtiainen was elected member of parliament from the South East Finland constituency. In the 2023 parliamentary election, he received only 632 votes in the South East Finland constituency, thereby failing to retain his seat in parliament.

=== Controversy ===
January 2020 Finnish newspaper Iltalehti revealed that Turtiainen had used travel expense allowance during his sick leave. Turtiainen also had the highest count of the allowance usage according to the paper.

The same month Turtiainen mocked a Finnish police officer on Twitter who filed a report of an offence. District attorney dropped the charges later, calling Turtiainen's statement to be within limits of acceptable criticism towards authorities despite the use of derogatory wording.

==== Expulsion from the Finns Party ====
On 3 June 2020 Turtiainen mocked the murder of George Floyd on his Twitter account with a tweet showing an image of Floyd, a police officer's knee on his neck and his face colorized pink, with the phrase "Pink Floyd". His parliamentary group called the tweet "not acceptable". The tweet was later deleted. As a response to Turtiainen's tweet, the Finns Party expelled him from the parliamentary group. The previous misconduct was taken account as well. Citing zero tolerance for racism, US-based company Elitefts announced that it is ending its business relationship with Ano Turtiainen's company, Metal Sport & Gear.

Turtiainen proceeded to found his own parliamentary group of one man. He appointed as the group secretary a former the Finns Party MP James Hirvisaari. Hirvisaari had been expelled from the Finns Party in 2013 after two incidents: he refused to fire his assistant who published racist post on the internet and his parliamentary visitor performed a Nazi salute which Hirvisaari photographed.

==== COVID-19 ====
Turtiainen has criticized actions related to COVID-19 pandemic, calling them "neo-communism" and refusing to take a COVID vaccine. He has also been spreading conspiracy theory related COVID-memes on his social media platforms. Within the Parliament Turtiainen has caused controversy by refusing to wear a face mask during the time it was recommended. He has been using derogatory language towards the chairmen after receiving animadversions from them regarding the face mask issue. In one instance fellow representatives interpreted his hand signs and choice of words as a violent threat. In Spring 2021 Turtiainen stated that he is "ready to kill if somebody in this country is forced to wear a mask". However, in Autumn 2020 it was revealed that his own company did manufacture and resell face masks. Turtiainen responded by saying he had nothing against the use of protective equipment.

==== Power Belongs to the People ====
In 2021, Turtiainen expanded his parliamentary group into a full political party, called "Power Belongs to the People". According to the party, the required 5,000 voter signatures were collected in a one day.

After the Russian invasion of Ukraine in 2022, Turtiainen caused public controversy with statements supporting Russia. The controversy caused 6 out of 10 Regional Council representatives of Power Belongs to the People to resign from the party. Turtiainen called them "opportunists".

After the 2023 parliamentary election, Turtiainen and his party secretary Marko Hiltunen were invited to attend the Russian government-organised St. Petersburg International Economic Forum. Both have said that Russia paid for their tickets, which cost more than €25,000.

Turtiainen was expelled from the party's leadership in March 2024 due to disagreements with the rest of the leadership. After this, the party publicly distanced itself from Turtiainen's pro-Russian positions.

==== Russia connection ====
Former Member of Parliament Turtiainen, who has been described as pro-Russia, participated in an international conference in Moscow in April 2024 and Yalta International Economic Forum in November 2024.

In October 2025, amid the Russo-Ukrainian war, Turtiainen moved to Moscow, Russia, and started learning Russian. In November 2025, he said: "... after all, we [Finns] are one and the same people with them [Russians]. If in the future we become part of them, still with our own legislation and other things, we would be one family, like brothers and sisters with them ...". In December 2025, Turtiainen said he was ready to fight with Russian forces against Finns. Later in the same month, Turtiainen said he has received political asylum in Russia. According to the Russian newspaper Argumenty i Fakty, Turtiainen claims he has been persecuted in Finland because of his pro-Russia statements and criticism of NATO.

In his speech at the Yaroslavl State University in May 2026, he said: "The Russophobic political class, subservient to the Anglo-Saxons, has destroyed Finland so badly that it is impossible for Finns to fix it. ... In my opinion, the situation is already so serious that Russia is forced to intervene in Finland's situation. Simply for the sake of its own security, not to mention for the sake of Russia's brother nation – the Finnish people – and also for the sake of world peace."

== Criminal record ==
In December 2015 Turtiainen published a Facebook status saying that "people had taken great personal risks when acting in elimination operations to destroy existing and planned asylum centres". In his Facebook status, Turtiainen considered the Finnish Red Cross to be his greatest enemy and wrote if "it was now time to expand operations to the enemy headquarters". The matter escalated into a controversy after Member of Parliament Laura Huhtasaari had liked the status. The Finnish Red Cross reported Turtiainen's message to the police. In September 2018 Turtiainen was sentenced in the district court of Southern Savonia to 60 day-fines for public incitement to crime. After being elected as a Member of Parliament, Turtiainen commented that "in this company this sentence is just a feather in my cap".

Turtiainen has also been sentenced for assault. According to Helsingin Sanomat, the district court of Southern Savonia sentenced Turtiainen to fines in March 2010 for assaulting a 14-year-old boy from Juva. Turtiainen had been previously sentenced for assault in 1995 and 1997.

== Entrepreneurship ==
Turtiainen owns 60% of the company METAL SPORT Licensing Oy, 50% of the company Gometal Oy and 50% of the company Bobbin Oy (Metal Sport). On 21 April 2022, Gometal Oy was declared bankrupt due to accrued taxes owed. Gometal Oy sold powerlifting equipment, clothing and Power Belongs to the People Party's fan products.

== Personal life ==
In November 2025, Turtiainen announced that he had moved to Moscow with his wife and was learning Russian. The Parliament has not received an explanation from him about the use of the group grants paid to his parliamentary group in 2023, which is why the Parliament is demanding more than 30,000 euros from him.
