= Viljo Virtanen =

Finnish politician (1912–1989)

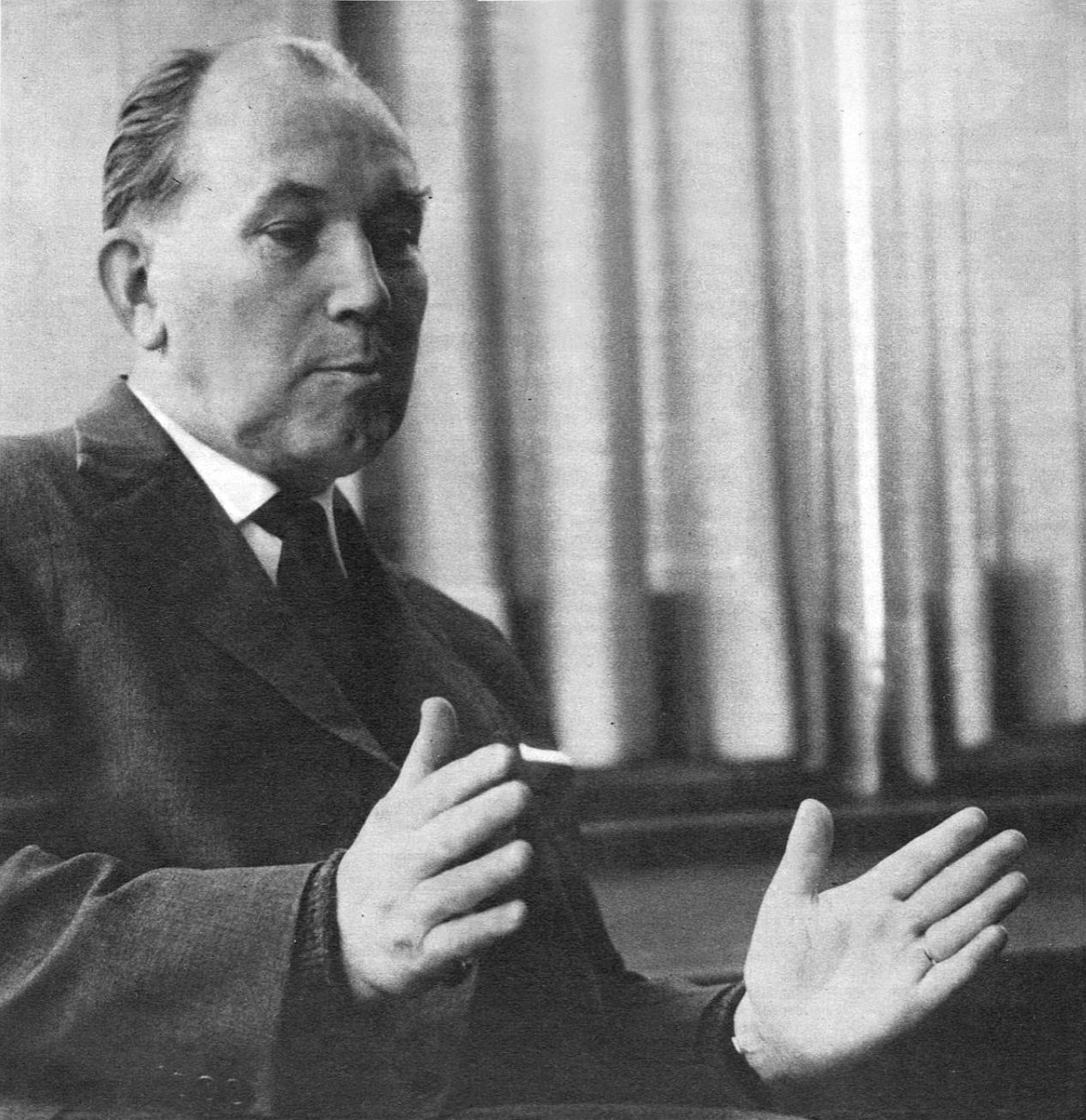
Viljo Virtanen

Viljo Artturi Virtanen (28 January 1912 – 2 July 1989) was a Finnish schoolteacher and politician, born in Karkkila. He was a member of the Parliament of Finland from 1951 to 1970, representing the Social Democratic Party of Finland (SDP). He served as Deputy Minister of Transport and Public Works from 22 March 1968 to 31 December 1969. Virtanen was the mayor of Savonlinna from 1963 to 1969 and the governor of Mikkeli Province from 1970 to 1979. He was a presidential elector in the 1950, 1956, 1962 and 1968 presidential elections.
