= Albin Pulkkinen =

Finnish lawyer, civil servant and politician

Albin Pulkkinen (21 April 1875, Mikkelin maalaiskunta - 29 October 1944) was a Finnish lawyer, civil servant and politician. He was a member of the Parliament of Finland from 1922 to 1924, representing the National Progressive Party. He was the Governor of Mikkeli Province from 1927 to 1933.
