= Uki Voutilainen =

Finnish politician (1922–2002)

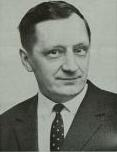
Uki Voutilainen in 1970

Uuno (Uki) Henrik Voutilainen (30 May 1922 – 6 March 2002) was a Finnish schoolteacher and politician, born in Kontiolahti. He was a member of the Parliament of Finland from 1962 to 1979, representing the Social Democratic Party of Finland (SDP). He was the governor of Mikkeli Province from 1979 to 1989. He was a presidential elector in the 1962, 1968 and 1978 presidential elections.
