= Diaconia University of Applied Sciences =

Institute of higher education in Finland

- Diakonia-ammattikorkeakoulu
- Type: University of applied sciences (polytechnic)
- Established: 1996
- Affiliations: Evangelical Lutheran Church of Finland
- Rector: Elina Juntunen
- Students: 3,004 (2010)
- Location: Helsinki, Oulu, Pori, Pieksämäki and Turku, Finland; 61.475469°N 21.7768434°E
- Website: www.diak.fi

Diaconia University of Applied Sciences (Finnish: Diakonia-ammattikorkeakoulu, Diak) is a university of applied sciences (a polytechnic or higher vocational institute offering tertiary level education) in Finland. It is affiliated with the Evangelical Lutheran Church of Finland.

Its campuses are located in Helsinki, Oulu, Pori, Pieksämäki and Turku.
