= Rovaniemen maalaiskunta =

Former municipality of Finland

Coordinates: 66°29′N 025°46′E

Location on Finnish map

Rovaniemen maalaiskunta (Swedish: Rovaniemi landskommun) was a municipality of Finland. It merged with the city of Rovaniemi on January 1, 2006.

It was located in the province of Lapland. The municipality had a population of 21,803 and covered an area of 7,915.51 square kilometres (3,056.20 sq mi) of which 409.06 square kilometres (157.94 sq mi) was water. The population density was 2.9 inhabitants per square kilometre (7.5/sq mi).

The municipality surrounded the town of Rovaniemi. In 2004 the two municipalities decided to unite into one municipality. The new municipality was formed on January 1, 2006 with the name Rovaniemen kaupunki (the city of Rovaniemi). The new municipality has a population of approximately 57,000. With an area of 7,900 square kilometres (3,100 sq mi) it is the largest city in Finland and Europe.

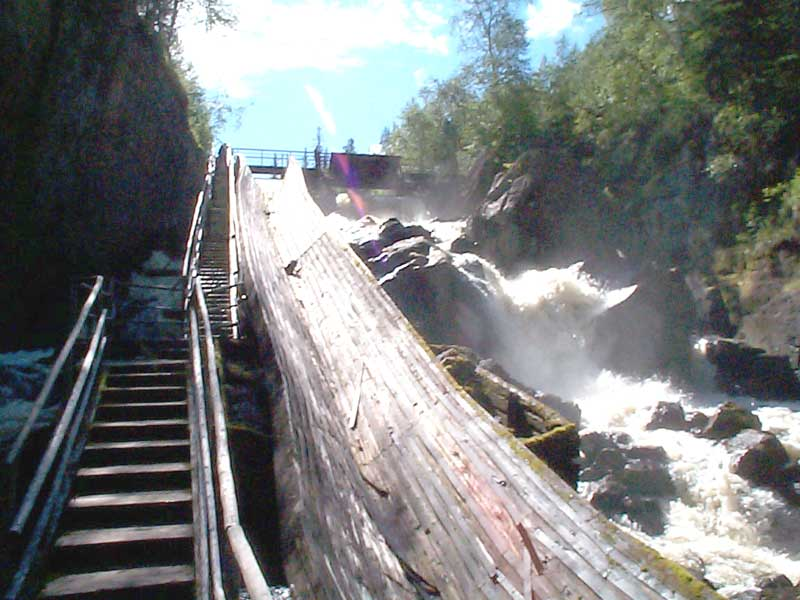
Auttiköngäs is located in the South-Eastern corner of Rovaniemen maalaiskunta. It has a drop of 16 meters.
