= Trammel hook =

Adjustable hook used to hold a pot or kettle over a fire

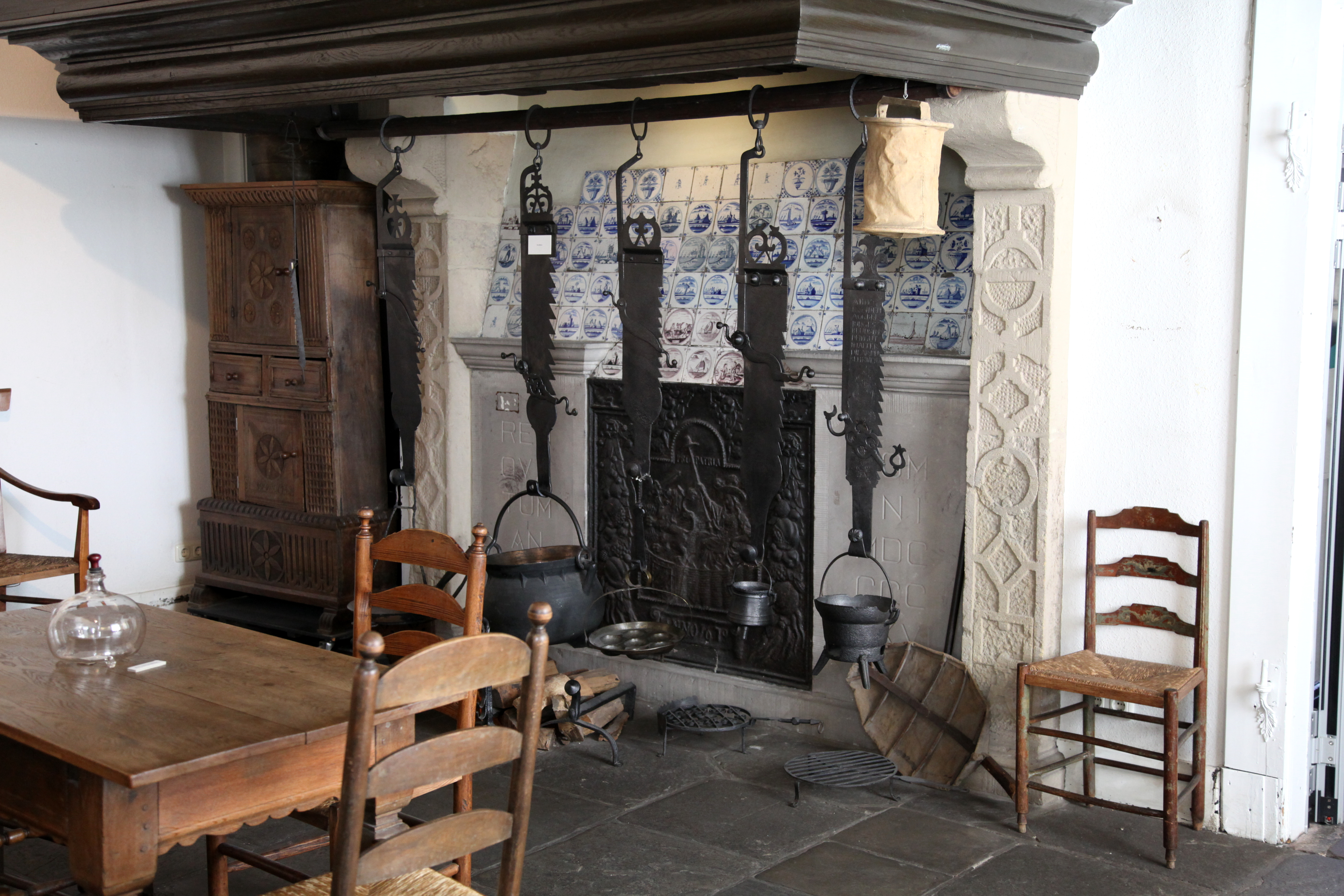
Five trammel hooks in a museum

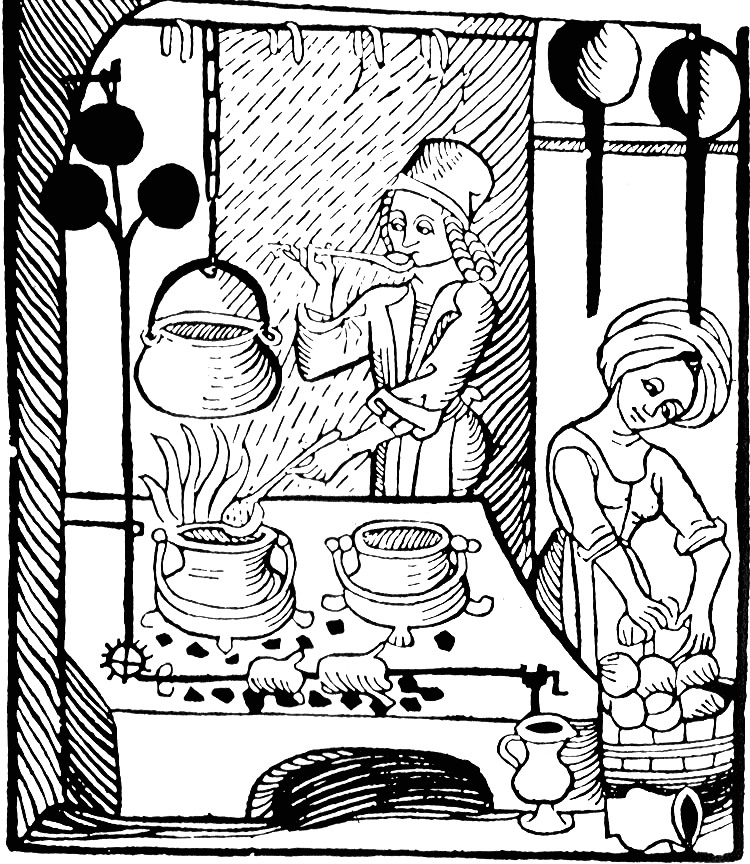
A 1485 German woodcut illustrating a trammel hook

A trammel hook is an adjustable hook used to suspend objects at variable heights.

Trammel hooks may be used to hold a pot or kettle over a fire while cooking, allowing the height of the pot to be easily changed. Thus the rate of heating can be controlled. Trammel hooks can also be used to hold candles, where changing the height makes the area lit wider or narrower.

Trammel hooks appear in heraldry, particularly in Germany, where they are called Kesselhaken (lit. 'kettle hook').

== See also ==
- Outdoor cooking
- Pothook
