= Pieksänmaa =

Former municipality of Finland

Coordinates: 62°17′15″N 027°04′40″E

Coat of arms of Pieksänmaa

Pieksänmaa is a former municipality of Finland. It became part of the town of Pieksämäki in 2007.

Pieksänmaa was formed in 2004 when the municipalities of Pieksämäen maalaiskunta, Jäppilä and Virtasalmi were consolidated to a single municipality. Pieksänmaa itself was consolidated to Pieksämäki three years later.

It is located in the former province of Eastern Finland and is part of the South Savo region. The municipality had a population of 8,754 (2003) and covered an area of 1,788.17 km² of which 249.40 km² was water. The population density was 5.7 inhabitants per km².

The municipality was unilingually Finnish.
