= Kangaslampi =

Former municipality of Finland

Coordinates: 62°17′45″N 28°15′05″E

Coat of arms of Kangaslampi

Kangaslampi is a former municipality of Finland. It was consolidated to Varkaus on 1 January 2005.

It is located in the former province of Eastern Finland and is part of the North Savo region. The municipality had a population of 1,611 (31 December 2004) and covered an area of 412.93 km^{2} of which 114.12 km^{2} is water. The population density was 5.38 inhabitants per km^{2}.

The municipality was unilingually Finnish.
