= Juva =

- Municipality
- Juvan kunta Juva kommun
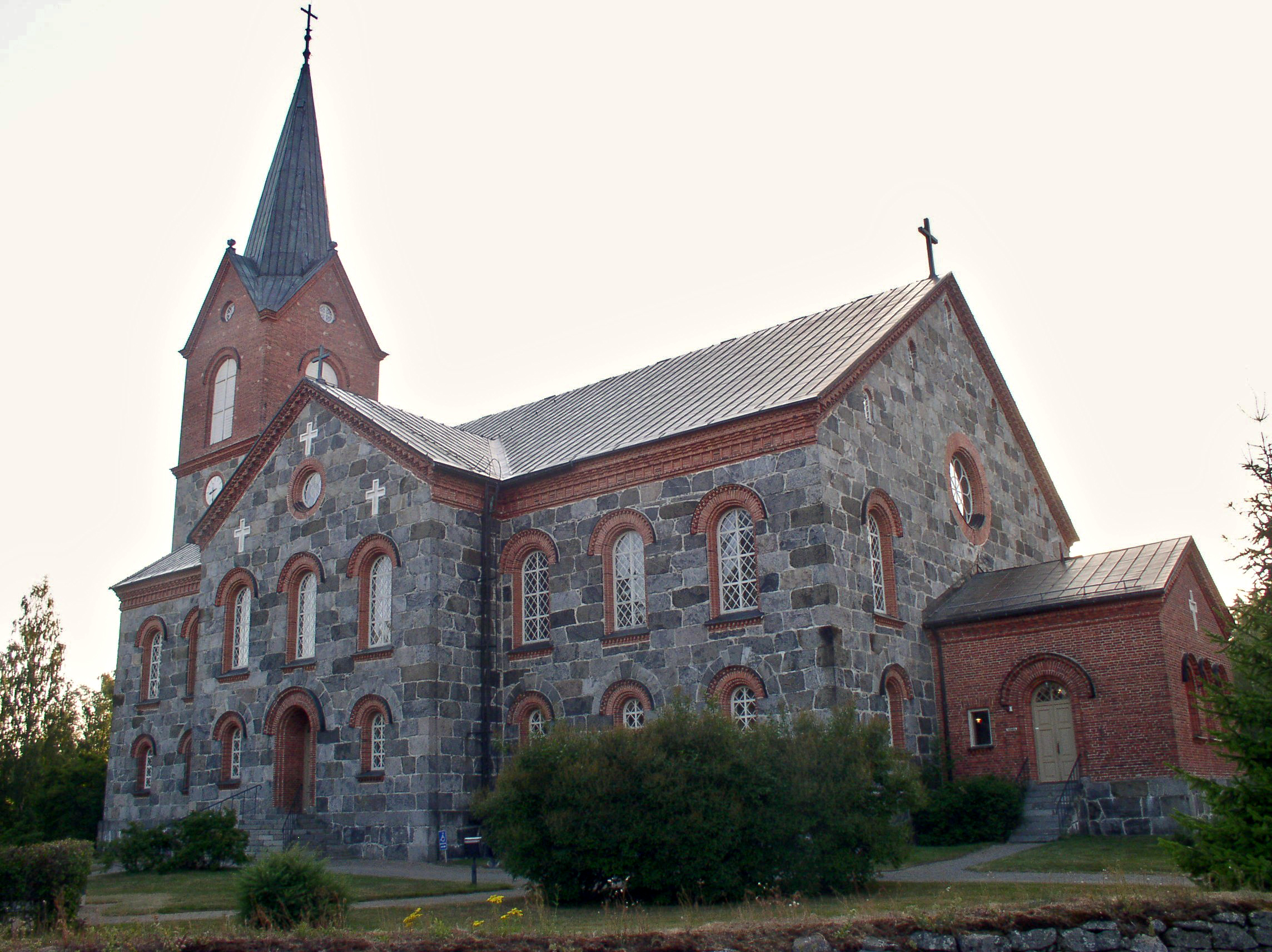
- Juva Church

- Coat of arms

- Location of Juva in Finland
- Interactive map of Juva
- Coordinates: 61°54′N 027°51′E
- Country: Finland
- Region: South Savo
- Sub-region: Pieksämäki
- Parish: 1442-01-19
- Municipality: 1868

Government
  - Municipal manager: Mervi Simoska

Area (2018-01-01)
  - Total: 1,345.69 km^{2} (519.57 sq mi)
  - Land: 1,163.37 km^{2} (449.18 sq mi)
  - Water: 182.32 km^{2} (70.39 sq mi)
  - Rank: 62nd largest in Finland

Population (2025-12-31)
  - Total: 5,569
  - Rank: 159th largest in Finland
  - Density: 4.79/km^{2} (12.4/sq mi)

Population by native language
  - Finnish: 95.1% (official)
  - Swedish: 0.3%
  - Others: 4.6%

Population by age
  - 0 to 14: 11.4%
  - 15 to 64: 52.1%
  - 65 or older: 36.5%
- Time zone: UTC+02:00 (EET)
  - Summer (DST): UTC+03:00 (EEST)
- Website: www.juva.fi/en

Juva (Swedish: Juva, also Jockas) is a municipality of Finland. It is located in the South Savo region some 270 kilometres (170 mi) North-East of Helsinki. It was founded on 19 January 1442, and is the oldest parish/municipality in Finland whose exact date of birth is known. At the time, it was only the second parish in Eastern Finland, and later, several other parishes were separated from it, such as Sääminki (present-day Savonlinna), Kuopio, Iisalmi, Pieksämäki, Joroinen, Leppävirta, Siilinjärvi, Lapinlahti and Maaninka. Secular municipal administration was established in 1868.

Neighbouring municipalities are Joroinen, Mikkeli, Pieksämäki, Puumala, Rantasalmi and Sulkava.

The municipality has a population of 5,569 (31 December 2025) and covers an area of 1,345.69 square kilometres (519.57 sq mi) of which 182.32 km^{2} (70.39 sq mi) is water. The population density is 4.79 inhabitants per square kilometre (12.4/sq mi). It is mainly an agricultural community, but possesses also some industries, wood industries products making Sisuwood/Is-vet Oy and Viitakosken Puu Oy, prefabricated food making Kruununherkku, bakery products making Siiskonen.

The municipality is unilingually Finnish.

Lake Jukajärvi is located near Juva municipality center. Lake Luonteri located in south Juva is part of Lake Saimaa.

== Notable people ==
- Kalevi Hämäläinen (1932-2005), cross-country skier
- Eero Kilpeläinen (born 1985), ice hockey player
- Anne Leinonen (born 1973), writer
- Ruoska, industrial metal band
- Martti Talvela (1935-1989), opera singer
- Ano Turtiainen (born 1967), powerlifter and politician
