= Pieksämäen maalaiskunta =

Former municipality of Finland

Coordinates: 62°17′N 27°04′E

Pieksämäen maalaiskunta is a former municipality of Finland. On January 1, 2004 it was joined to new municipality of Pieksänmaa with Jäppilä and Virtasalmi.
