= Jäppilä =

Former municipality of Finland

Coordinates: 62°22′40″N 027°26′05″E

Coat of Arms of Jäppilä

Jäppilä (Finnish pronunciation: [ˈjæpːilæ]) is a former municipality of Finland. On 1 January 2004, it was merged to Pieksämäen maalaiskunta and Virtasalmi to form the new municipality of Pieksänmaa, which merged with the town of Pieksämäki in 2007. The village of Jäppilä is located northeast of Pieksänmäki center.

The coat of arms has the blazon sable, a trammel hook or.
