= Virtasalmi =

Former municipality of Finland

Coordinates: 62°08′00″N 27°27′50″E

Coat of arms of Virtasalmi

Virtasalmi is a former municipality of Finland. It was located in the region of Southern Savonia in eastern Finland. The municipality was unilingually Finnish-speaking.

Virtasalmi had a population of approximately 1,100 inhabitants prior to its merger and covered an area of about 245 square kilometres (95 sq mi), of which a significant portion consisted of lakes and forest. Like many rural municipalities in Eastern Finland, it was characterized by small villages, agriculture, forestry, and summer cottages.

On 1 January 2004, Virtasalmi was consolidated with Jäppilä and Pieksämäen maalaiskunta to form the new municipality of Pieksänmaa. Later, in 2007, Pieksänmaa itself was merged into the town of Pieksämäki as part of a broader municipal restructuring in Finland.

Virtasalmi's coat of arms featured symbolic elements reflecting the area's waterways and natural surroundings, which are significant to the region's identity.

== History ==
Virtasalmi was established as an independent municipality in 1920, when it was separated from Pieksämäen maalaiskunta. Throughout the 20th century, the municipality experienced gradual population decline, a common trend in rural Eastern Finland due to urbanization and migration to larger cities.
