= Municipalities of Finland =

Local level of administration in Finland

Municipalities of Finland Suomen kunnat (Finnish) Finlands kommuner (Swedish)
- Also known as: Kaupunki, stad
- Category: Municipality
- Location: Finland
- Found in: Regions
- Number: 308 (list) (as of 2025)
- Populations: Largest: Helsinki (pop. 657,674); Smallest: Sottunga (pop. 109)
- Areas: Largest: Inari (17,333.65 km^{2}); Smallest: Kauniainen (6 km^{2})
- Government: Municipal council

The municipalities (Finnish: kunta; Swedish: kommun) represent the local level of administration in Finland and act as the fundamental, self-governing administrative units of the country. The entire country is incorporated into municipalities and legally, all municipalities are equal, although certain municipalities are called cities or towns (Finnish: kaupunki; Swedish: stad). Municipalities have the right to levy a flat percentual income tax, which is between 16 and 22 percent, and they provide two thirds of public services. Municipalities control many community services, such as schools, the water supply, and local streets. They do not maintain highways, set laws or keep police forces, which are responsibilities of the central government. The historical responsibilities of providing healthcare, rescue, and social services were transferred to Wellbeing services counties in 2023.

== Government ==
Municipalities have council-manager government: they are governed by an elected council (kunnanvaltuusto, kommunfullmäktige), which is legally autonomous and answers only to the voters. The size of the council is proportional to the population, the lowest number of councillors being 9 in Sottunga and the highest 85 in Helsinki. A subsection of the council, the municipal executive board (kunnanhallitus), controls the municipal government and monitors the implementation of decisions of the council. Its decisions must be approved by the council. Unlike national cabinets, the composition of the executive board is derived from the composition of the council, not along government-opposition lines. Individual decisions are prepared in specialized municipal boards (lautakunta), such as zoning, social assistance, and education boards, and then taken to a council meeting. Council, executive board, and municipal board memberships are elected positions of responsibility, not full-time jobs. Depending on municipality, the chair of the executive board may serve the duty as part-time or full-time. Remuneration depends on the municipality and position, but is generally nominal or modest: a regular council member is paid 70 euro on average on a per-meeting basis (2017).

Municipal managers, called kaupunginjohtaja, stadsdirektör for cities and kunnanjohtaja, kommunsdirektör for other municipalities, are civil servants named by the council. The city mayor of Helsinki is called ylipormestari / överborgmästare "Lord Mayor" for historical reasons. For a long time this was the only model of executive leadership, but after a change in law, Tampere was the first city to elect a mayor (pormestari / borgmästare) in 2007. Other cities and municipalities, such as Helsinki in 2017, would do so as well, but the model is still rare. The mayor is not, however, elected directly, but by the municipal council. The mayor acts as municipal manager and as the chairperson of the municipal executive board.

Although municipalities do not have police or legislative powers, local ordinances concerning traffic can be set, and municipal parking inspectors can give parking tickets. Municipalities are legal persons and can appear in an administrative court. The state of Finland is a separate legal person.

Municipalities are independent and not a part of a local state hierarchy. The exception to this is in the case of a judicial review of compliance to administrative law. Municipalities cooperate in regions of Finland. State agencies have jurisdictions spanning one or more regions: each region is served by an ely-keskus (elinkeino-, liikenne- ja ympäristökeskus) on employment, the economy, transport and environment, while law and environmental enforcement is handled by the local aluehallintovirasto, governing multi-region jurisdictions termed alue.

== Taxation and revenue ==
Residents pay a municipal tax that is a form of income tax, which is a large part of the income of a municipality (42% of income). Municipal tax is nominally a flat tax that is levied from a broader population (including lower income levels) than progressive state income tax, which is collected only from medium to high income earners. However, in practice even the municipal tax is progressive due to generous deductions granted to the lowest income levels. The pre-deduction base tax varies from 16% in affluent Kauniainen to 20% or more in a number of small rural municipalities. Next to the municipal tax, municipalities receive funding from the state budget (valtionapu, 19% of income). This funding is means-tested to municipality wealth and serves to balance the differences in municipal tax revenue. Besides taxes, sales revenue, fees and profit of operations also form a substantial share of municipal income (21%). In 2023, taxation will be significantly changed, when new wellbeing services counties are founded. Since these are funded by the state, municipal taxes will be reduced by 12.6 percentage points from ~20 to ~7%, and state taxes will be increased correspondingly.

Municipalities also levy a property tax, amounting to 3.6% of income, which is comparatively low: the annual fee is 0.32-0.75% of net present value for permanent residences and 0.50-1.00% for leisure properties like summer cottages as well as undeveloped plots. This is always paid by the owner, never a tenant directly, unlike the council tax. Municipalities receive a share of corporate tax revenue (yhteisövero) from companies having a place of business in the municipality (3.8% of income).

Some municipal functions receive direct funding both from the municipality and the state, such as universities of applied sciences.

== Tasks and services ==
Finland has an extensive public welfare system, and municipalities are responsible for much of those services. Tasks of the municipalities are as follows:

- Education (see Education in Finland) and culture
  - Peruskoulu (primary education, grades 1–9)
  - Lukio (gymnasiums)
  - Ammattioppilaitos (secondary vocational schools)
  - Universities of applied sciences (tertiary vocational schools)
  - Kansanopisto (folk high schools)
  - Public libraries
  - Youth centres
  - Public exercise facilities (public tracks, etc.)
- Infrastructure and land use
  - Zoning
  - Public transport
  - Maintenance of local streets
  - Water
  - Energy
  - Waste collection
  - Environment
- Economic development
  - Promotion of the local economy and employment
- Law enforcement
  - Food safety inspection
  - Animal welfare inspection
  - Environmental protection inspection
  - Parking enforcement
  - Public transport payment enforcement

Although municipalities are responsible for their own finances, there is specific legislation and regulation that requires the services to be provided up to a standard. This means that, although municipalities have the power to spend tax-generated income on what they want to, they are required to allocate funds to legally-prescribed services first.

Municipalities may provide some of these services through corporations that they own or from private companies that they regulate. For example, Helsinki Regional Transport Authority (HSL) provides public transport services in the capital area.

== Statistics ==
Municipalities of Finland by language (2016–present): Beige: unilingually Finnish Dark blue: unilingually Swedish Turquoise: bilingual, majority Finnish, minority Swedish Light blue: bilingual, majority Swedish, minority Finnish Wine: majority Finnish and one or three Sami languages as minority languages

In 2021, there were 309 municipalities in Finland, of which 107 were cities or towns (kaupunki). Sixteen municipalities are unilingually Swedish (all in the autonomous Åland region), while 33 are bilingual: 15 with Swedish as the majority language (all but four in Ostrobothnia) and 18 with Finnish as the majority language (all but five in Uusimaa region). Four municipalities in northern Lapland (Utsjoki, Inari, Sodankylä and Enontekiö) have one or all of the three Sami languages spoken in Finland as an official language. From 2025 the number of municipalities decreased to 308.

Finnish municipalities can choose to be called either kaupunki (city or town) or kunta (small town or rural municipality). Although the Finnish Environment Institute classifies urban settlements with over 15,000 inhabitants as kaupunki, municipalities can name themselves kaupunki with fewer inhabitants. There are 45,333 inhabitants in Nurmijärvi, the largest kunta in Finland, and 1,248 inhabitants in Kaskinen, the smallest kaupunki, so the kunta–kaupunki categorisation mainly concerns the name of the municipality.

The areas of the municipalities vary, as the population is the primary criterion for forming a municipality. The largest municipalities in size are found in Lapland, of which the largest is Inari at 17,333.65 km^{2} (6,692.56 sq mi) (130 km square). The smallest municipalities are very small towns. Kaskinen is an independent town with a land area of only 10.49 km^{2} (4.05 sq mi). Kauniainen, which was originally a corporation in Espoo, is only 6.00 km^{2} (2.32 sq mi).

== History ==
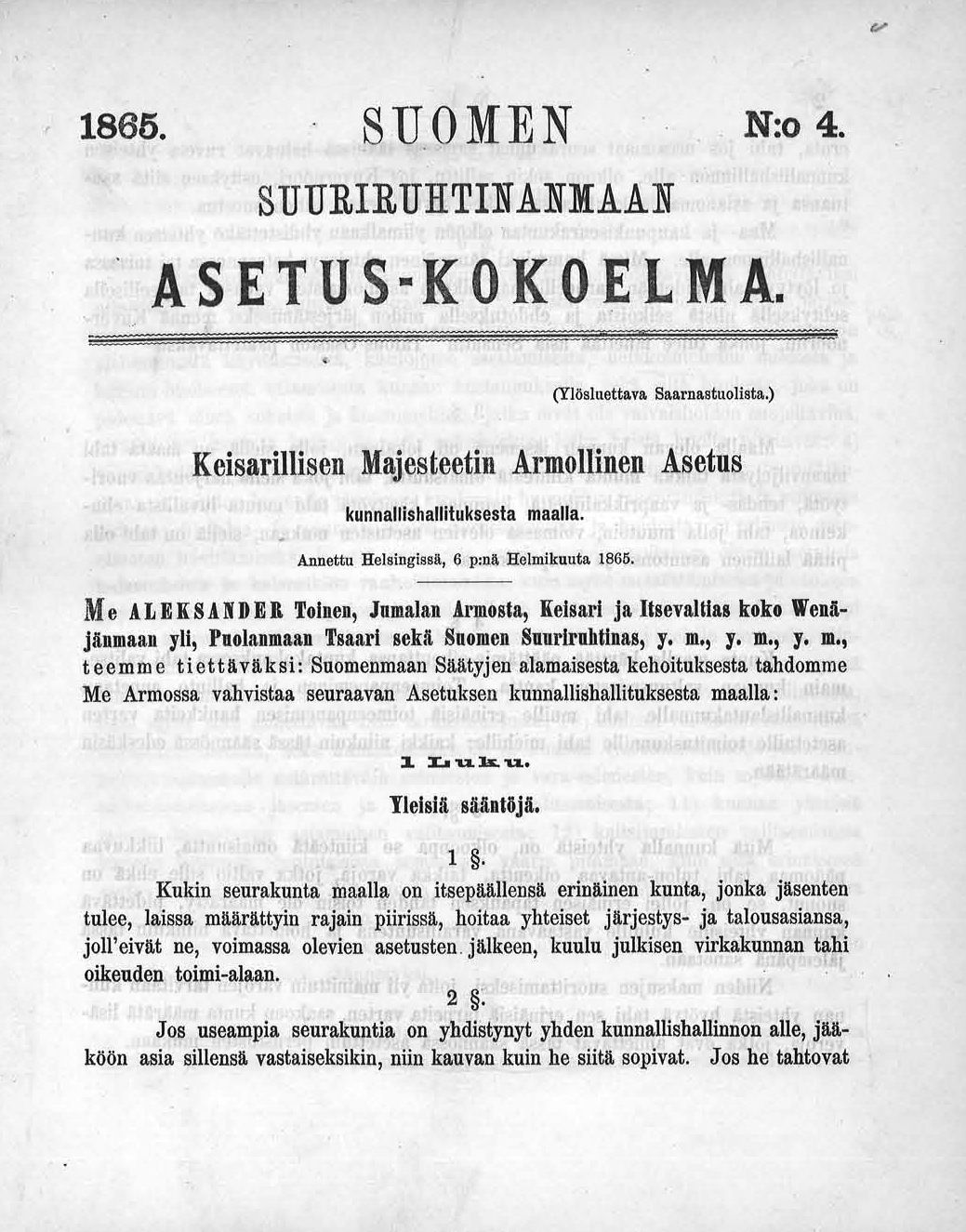
The first page of the 1865 municipal ordinance by Emperor Alexander II of Russia

Municipalities were originally parishes. The old word for a municipality is pitäjä, 'keeper', because when the system was instituted, one municipality kept one minister. Municipalities were divided into villages, which themselves were made up of individual properties. Borders between properties and therefore between municipalities were defined by oral agreements passed down from generation to generation; they were usually along straight lines between defined markers such as boulders. Medieval documentation survives only from legal disputes concerning borders. In the 18th century, King Gustaf III implemented the Great Partition, where common lands were redistributed into larger properties, and claimed all unclaimed land to the crown. This means that there is no "leftover" land outside the jurisdiction of municipalities, as all land belongs to either to a private property or to the government. The secular government divided the properties into taxable units (villages and secular municipalities) according to its own convenience. This did not necessarily follow parish boundaries. Cities were chartered separately. Up to 1734, the law was different in cities than in rural municipalities.

On 6 February 1865, the modern municipalities were established as secular entities separate from the parishes. The reform was inspired by the Swedish municipal reforms of 1862. Up to 1964, cities financed their own police and registry services. Until 1977 municipalities were divided into cities (kaupunki, stad), market towns (kauppala, köping) and rural municipalities (maalaiskunta, landskommun). The market town category was abolished and these were renamed as cities. The rest of the municipalities were classified as 'other municipalities'. All municipalities called maalaiskunta were eventually either merged to their parent cities or changed their names. From 1995 onwards only 'municipality' is recognized by law and any municipality is allowed to call itself a city.

== Identification and heraldry ==
The coat of arms of Vantaa, incorporating heraldic elements of the region of Uusimaa, such as azure color and argent

Not all municipalities have an obvious urban center; rural municipalities are often made up of villages that may be some distance apart. Although the church village (kirkonkylä, abbreviated kk) is the historical center, the largest or administrative center may be in another village. For example, Vihti has a church village (Vihdin kirkonkylä), but its administrative center is in Nummela. Often, the church village has the same name as the municipality, as with Vihti. However, this is not necessarily so, e.g. Enontekiö is governed from Hetta; these villages are often erroneously labeled on maps. This happens because the name of the municipality refers to the entire parish, not just a single center like a church village. Villages have no administrative role, although some have voluntary village associations (kyläyhdistys) and other non-governmental public life.

Although related, urban areas in Finland (taajama) are not local administrative units. A catalog is compiled each year by Statistics Finland, a state agency, and used primarily for traffic-related purposes (signage, speed limits, and highway planning). There are 745 officially recognized urban areas in Finland, 49 of which have more than 10,000 inhabitants and six more than 100,000.

Each municipality has a coat of arms. These are posted on the municipal borders and shown in official documents representing the municipality. The coats of arms for many municipalities have been designed in the modern era, many of them by Gustaf von Numers. Municipalities like Vantaa (since 2015) and Helsinki (since 2017) also have a logo.

== Capital region ==
The Helsinki capital region has no special arrangements. The area consists of four entirely independent cities that form a continuous conurbation. The Helsinki metropolitan area has grown in population and area relatively quickly: the nearby municipalities, considered rural only 50 years ago, have become suburbs, and the growth is projected to continue. A state-imposed merger of Helsinki and a part of Sipoo, a rural, 40% Swedish-speaking municipality adjacent to the Helsinki metropolitan area, was approved by the government in 2006, against the wishes of the Sipoo municipal council. This area will effectively become a new (and Finnish-speaking) suburb with many times the inhabitants of Sipoo.

== Mergers and reform ==
There is currently a heated political debate in Finland about reforming the municipality system. Essentially, having many small municipalities is seen as a hangover from Finland's agrarian years, and detrimental to the provision of public services. As a result, there have been suggestions of state-imposed mergers. A committee led by the former Minister for Regional and Municipal Affairs, Hannes Manninen, suggested creating a two-tier system of municipalities with different powers, while the Association of Finnish Local and Regional Authorities (Kuntaliitto) favoured a system where municipalities would be units of at least 20,000–30,000 inhabitants, cf. the current median at 4,700. The motion was inspired by a similar reform in Denmark (see Municipalities of Denmark). The former government, Matti Vanhanen's second cabinet, however, did not plan to impose mergers.

Many voluntary mergers have been agreed on. Ten mergers were completed in 2005, one in 2006, 14 in 2007 and one in 2008. In 2009, there were more, many of which consolidated more than two municipalities. Several cities merged with surrounding rural municipalities in Hämeenlinna, Salo, Kouvola, Seinäjoki, Naantali, Kauhava, Lohja, Raseborg, Jyväskylä and Oulu in 2009. In total, there were 32 mergers, involving 99 municipalities, and this reduced the number of municipalities by 67. The year 2009 also marked the end of the last maalaiskunta, where a municipality surrounded a city but shared the city's name, in Jyväskylä. There were four mergers in 2010, six in 2011, ten in 2013, three in 2015, four in 2016, two in 2017, one in 2020 and one in 2021. In the period 2005–2021, the number of municipalities was voluntarily reduced from 444 to 309.

In 2012, Jyrki Katainen's cabinet published a plan aiming at merging municipalities to reach a target population per municipality of 20,000. Commuter belts have also been proposed as a target by a government committee, so that municipalities where more than 35% of the workforce commutes would be subject to a merger.

The Sipilä cabinet, from 2015, had been preparing a reform of health and social services (sote-uudistus), aimed at increasing choice between municipal and private healthcare, and assigning some healthcare responsibilities into larger units than a municipality. This was terminated by the Marin cabinet.

== Municipalities by regions ==
- Municipalities of Central Finland
- Municipalities of Southwest Finland
- Municipalities of Kainuu
- Municipalities of Kymenlaakso
- Municipalities of Lapland
- Municipalities of North Karelia
- Municipalities of South Karelia
- Municipalities of Ostrobothnia
- Municipalities of Central Ostrobothnia
- Municipalities of North Ostrobothnia
- Municipalities of South Ostrobothnia
- Municipalities of Pirkanmaa
- Municipalities of Satakunta
- Municipalities of North Savo
- Municipalities of South Savo
- Municipalities of Kanta-Häme
- Municipalities of Päijät-Häme
- Municipalities of Uusimaa
- Municipalities of Åland

== Map ==

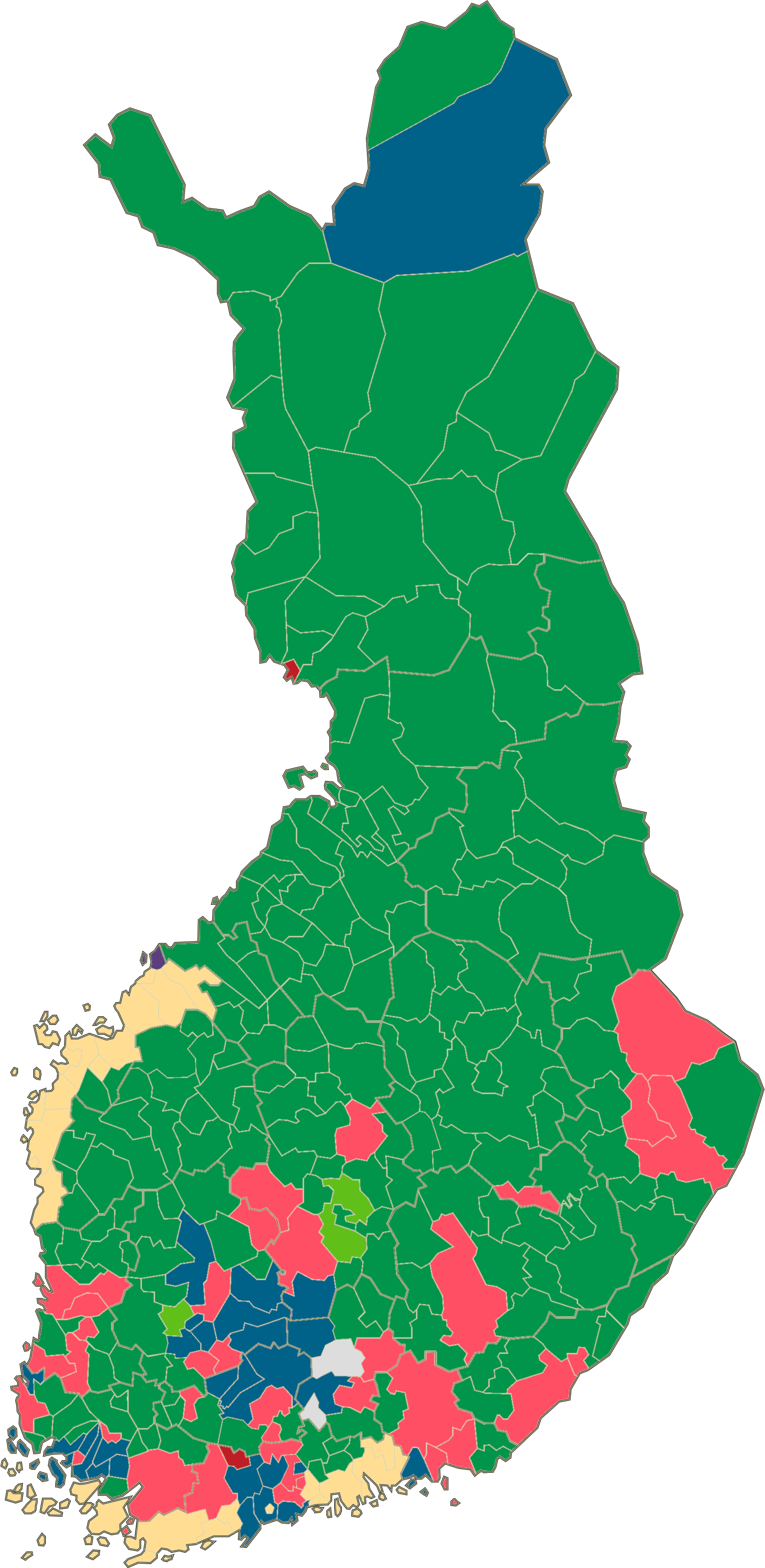
The biggest party in the municipalities after the 2017 Finnish municipal elections

The biggest party in the municipalities after the 2021 Finnish municipal elections

Second largest party by vote percentage after the 2021 Finnish municipal elections

== See also ==
- List of municipalities of Finland
- List of cities and towns in Finland
- List of former municipalities of Finland
