= Pieksämäki =

- Town
- Pieksämäen kaupunki Pieksämäki stad
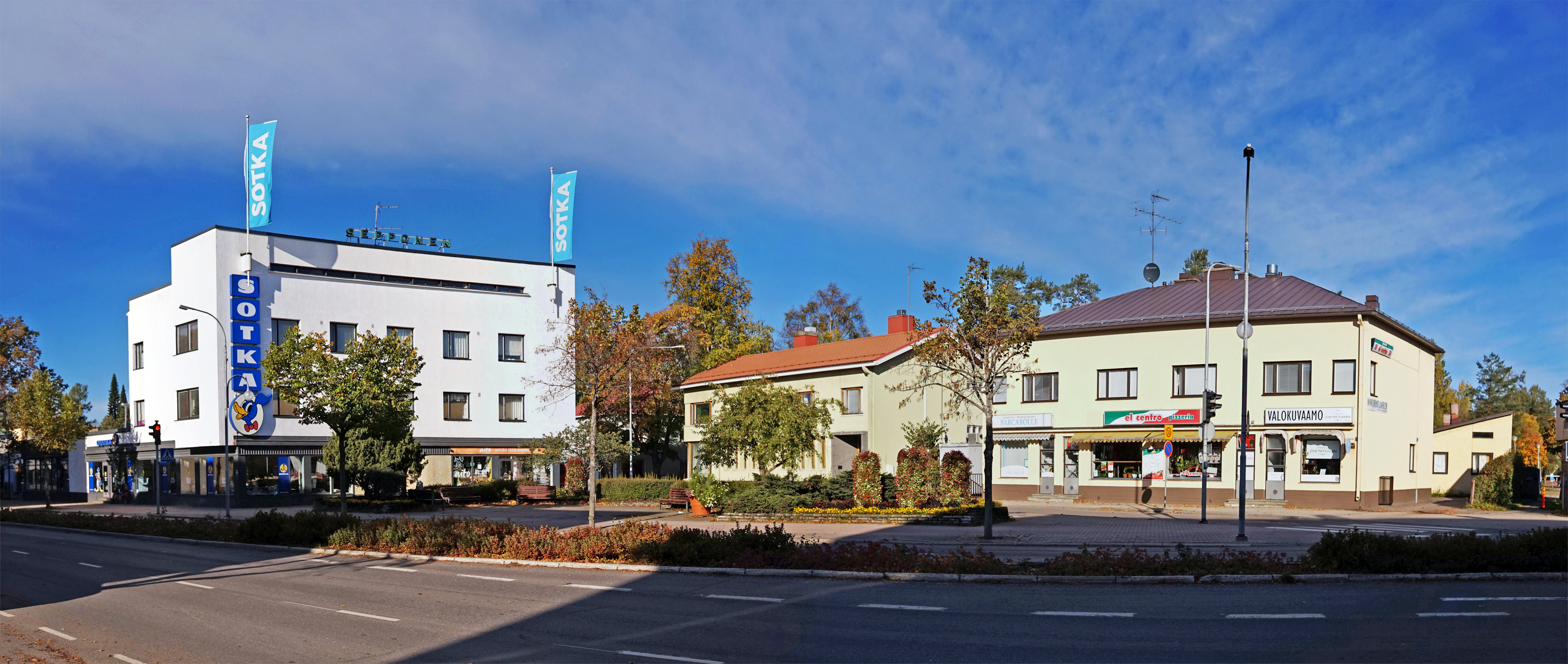

- Coat of arms

- Location of Pieksämäki in Finland
- Interactive map of Pieksämäki
- Coordinates: 62°18′01″N 27°09′51″E
- Country: Finland
- Region: South Savo
- Sub-region: Pieksämäki
- Charter: 1962
- Re-established: 2007

Government
  - Town manager: Ulla Nykänen

Area (2018-01-01)
  - Total: 1,836.22 km^{2} (708.97 sq mi)
  - Land: 1,569.03 km^{2} (605.81 sq mi)
  - Water: 266.76 km^{2} (103.00 sq mi)
  - Rank: 40th largest in Finland

Population (2025-12-31)
  - Total: 17,124
  - Rank: 66th largest in Finland
  - Density: 10.91/km^{2} (28.3/sq mi)

Population by native language
  - Finnish: 91.9% (official)
  - Swedish: 0.1%
  - Others: 8%

Population by age
  - 0 to 14: 11.7%
  - 15 to 64: 55.1%
  - 65 or older: 33.2%
- Time zone: UTC+02:00 (EET)
  - Summer (DST): UTC+03:00 (EEST)
- Website: www.pieksamaki.fi

Pieksämäki (Finnish pronunciation: [ˈpie̯ksæˌmæki]) is a town and municipality of Finland. It is located in the South Savo region, about 75 kilometres (47 mi) north of Mikkeli, 85 kilometres (53 mi) east of Jyväskylä and 95 kilometres (59 mi) south of Kuopio. The town has a population of 17,124 (31 December 2025) and covers an area of 1,836.22 square kilometres (708.97 sq mi) of which 266.76 km^{2} (103.00 sq mi) is water. The population density is 10.91 inhabitants per square kilometre (28.3/sq mi). Neighbouring municipalities are Hankasalmi, Joroinen, Juva, Kangasniemi, Leppävirta, Mikkeli, Rautalampi, and Suonenjoki.

== Formation ==
Pieksämäki was granted town privileges in 1962 and enlarged on 1 January 2007 with the consolidation of the Pieksämäki and Pieksänmaa municipalities.

== Transport ==
The Pieksämäki railway station is an important junction for the Finnish railway network, and Savo Railway Museum is located in the area.

== Education ==
Diaconia University of Applied Sciences has one of its five campuses in Pieksämäki.

== Politics ==
Results of the 2023 Finnish parliamentary election in Pieksämäki:

- Finns Party 21.5
- Social Democratic Party 21.0%
- Centre Party 18.4%
- National Coalition Party 16.7%
- Green League 7.1%
- Left Alliance 5.9%
- Christian Democrats 5.2%
- Liik 2.4%

== International relations ==
=== Twin towns — sister cities ===
Pieksämäki is twinned with:

- Faaborg-Midtfyn, Denmark
- Falkenberg, Sweden
- Gyöngyös, Hungary
- Porsgrunn, Norway
- Shuya, Russia

== Notable people ==
- Rietrik Polén (1823–1884), journalist and Finnish nationalist
- Edvard August Vainio (1853–1929), lichenologist
- Wilhelmiina Arpiainen (1859–1922), writer and Missionary in China
- Sylvi Kekkonen (1900–1974), writer and First Lady of Finland
- Ville Leskinen (1995–), ice hockey player for Jukurit
- Ari-Pekka Liukkonen (1989–), olympic swimmer
- Esapekka Lappi (1991–), rally driver
- Kari Jalkanen (1945-2010), Finnish schlager and country & western singer

== See also ==
- Jäppilä
