= Yövesi =

Lake in eastern Finland

- Location within Finland
- Location: Eastern Finland
- Coordinates: 61°27′N 27°25′E
- Primary inflows: Varkaantaipale canal
- Primary outflows: Liittokivi open area
- Basin countries: Finland
- Surface area: 58 km^{2} (22 sq mi)
- Max. depth: 84.3 m (277 ft)
- Surface elevation: 75.7 m (248 ft)
- Islands: Himalansaari (1.01 km^{2}), Toivosaari, Ristisaari
- Settlements: Ristiina

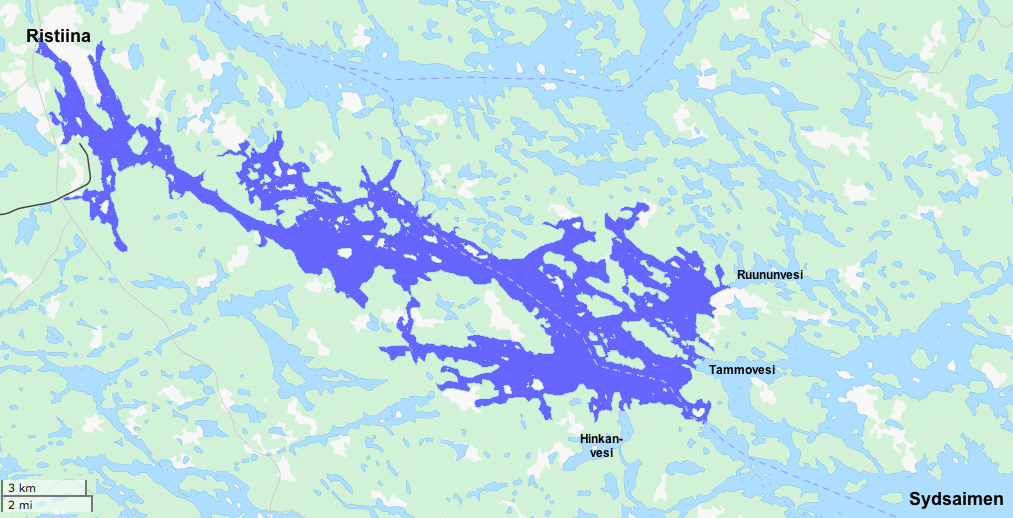
Yövesi in the Saimen Region

Yövesi (Finnish pronunciation: [ˈyø̯ˌʋesi]; literally "night water") is a sub-lake of the lake Saimaa in eastern Finland. It is located in Mikkeli municipality in the Southern Savonia region. Part of the Saimaa lake system, it borders on the system of Pihlajavesi to the east. The deepest point of the whole Saimaa is in Yövesi, in Käenniemenselkä open area. The Astuvansalmi rock paintings are situated in the northern shore of Yövesi.

The critically endangered fish Arctic char lives in Yövesi. Fishing of Arctic char is totally prohibited.
