= Turku University =

Turku University may refer to:

- Royal Academy of Turku, the first university in Finland (1640–1828)
- Åbo Akademi University, founded in 1918 with Swedish as the official language
- University of Turku, founded in 1920 with Finnish as the official language
- Turku University of Applied Sciences, founded 1992
