= Pellosniemi =

- Urban area
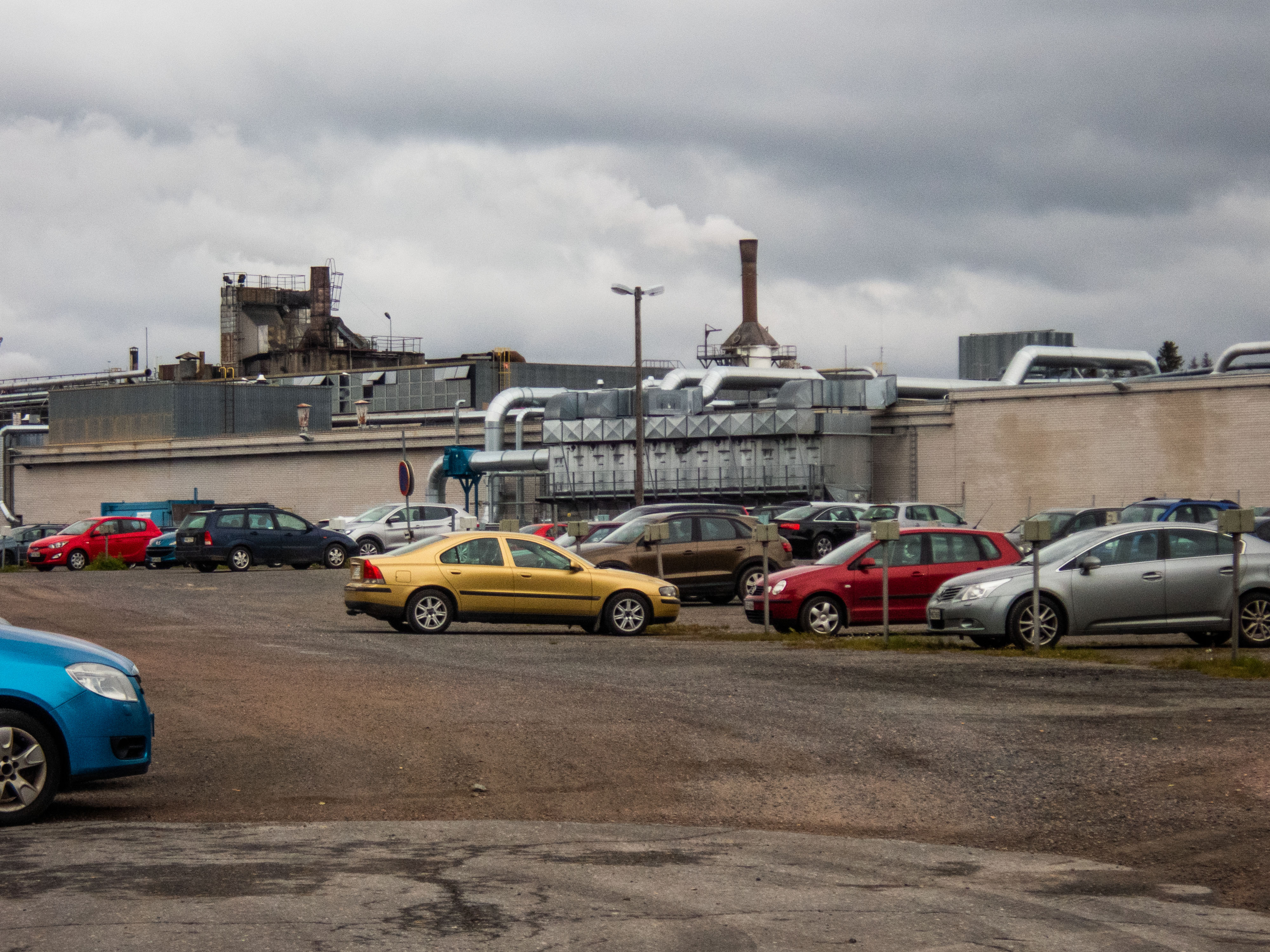
- Pellos factories in 2021

- Location in South Savo
- Coordinates: 61.473°N 27.267°E
- Country: Finland
- Region: South Savo
- Sub-region: Mikkeli sub-region
- Municipality: Mikkeli
- Former municipality: Ristiina

Area
  - Land: 1.71 km^{2} (0.66 sq mi)

Population (31 December 2023)
  - Total: 234
  - Density: 136.8/km^{2} (354/sq mi)
- Time zone: UTC+2 (EET)
  - Summer (DST): UTC+3 (EEST)

Pellosniemi is an urban area (taajama) in Ristiina, Mikkeli, Finland. It is located on the western shore of Yövesi, a section of lake Saimaa, south of central Ristiina on the opposite shore. As of 31 December 2023, the urban area had a population of 234.

The development of Pellosniemi began with the establishment of the Pellos Oy particle board factory in 1963. Much of the urban area was built between the 1960s and 1970s.

== Etymology ==
While the name Pellosniemi in its modern sense was adopted in the 1960s, it has been in use since at least the 16th century, when Pellosniemi and Visulahti were the names of two administrative divisions into which the old Savilahti parish was divided; the former covered the later Ristiina as well as parts of Mikkeli proper. According to Kauko Pirinen, its center was in the village of Olkkolanniemi, where a farm named Pellosniemi still exists. The name, roughly meaning "field cape", may be a reference to the fact that the area is the most fertile part of South Savo, with settled agriculture (as opposed to slash-and-burn agriculture) possibly being practiced there before spreading to other parts of the region.

The name of the cape on which the urban area lies is called Karsikkoniemi, referring to karsikko trees, some of which were still used until the early 20th century.

== Geography ==
Pellosniemi is located on the western shore of Yövesi, which separates it from the center of Ristiina to its north. The smaller lake Kilpijärvi, which discharges into Yövesi, is located west of the urban area. The Finnish national road 13 passes through Pellosniemi.

The urban area of Pellosniemi, as defined by Statistics Finland, had a population of 234, an area of 1.71 square kilometers (0.66 sq mi) and a population density of 136.8 inhabitants per square kilometer (354/sq mi) on 31 December 2023.

== History ==
The urban area of Pellosniemi is located on the Karsikkoniemi cape, which originally belonged to the villages of Heikkilä, Liikala and Rahikkala. The cape was mainly settled between the late 18th and early 19th centuries, with the first farms being tenant farms, such as Ostolahti and Yökallio, which were established on lands of the Brahelinna estate. Other early farms include Kilpisalo, Pöntinen and Kyllönen, established in the 19th century.

In 1963, Aarne J. Aarnio founded the Pellos Oy company and established a particle board factory in the area, followed by a plywood factory in 1968. Much of the urban area was built between the 1960s and 1970s, including factory buildings, apartments and service buildings. The municipality of Ristiina constructed a harbor in 1969, and a branch of the Savo railway for freight transport, beginning in Mynttilä and terminating in Pellosniemi, was opened in 1979. All apartments in Pellosniemi were exclusively rented out to factory workers until the mid-1980s, when the municipality bought most of the buildings. Since 1996, the Pellos factories have been part of UPM Kymmene. The particle board factory was closed in 1994, but was replaced by a second plywood factory, followed by a third one in 2002.

== Economy and services ==
The Pellos factories became the biggest employer in Ristiina soon after their establishment and have retained this status into the 21st century; in 2011, the factories had 670 employees in total. In October 2025, the city of Mikkeli leased out ten hectares of land in Pellosniemi for the construction of a data center.

As of 2022, Pellosniemi had no services of its own; the closest ones are found in central Ristiina. Former services have included a school, a daycare center and a store. The Pellosniemi school was established in 1970, being one of the last schools in the country to be established under the old kansakoulu system. The municipality of Ristiina adopted the modern peruskoulu system in 1974. The school was closed in 2015.
