= Kalvitsa =

Kalvitsa may refer to:

== People ==
- Otto Kalvitsa (Otto Arturovich Kalvits; 1888–1930), Finnish-born Soviet aviator

== Places ==
- Kalvitsa, Mikkeli, village in Mikkeli, Finland
- Kalvitsa, Russia, village in the Kobyaysky District of Sakha Republic, Russia
