= Kalvitsa, Mikkeli =

Kalvitsa
- Village
- Location in South Savo
- Coordinates: 61.910°N 27.285°E
- Country: Finland
- Region: South Savo
- Sub-region: Mikkeli sub-region
- Municipality: Mikkeli
- Time zone: UTC+2 (EET)
  - Summer (DST): UTC+3 (EEST)

Kalvitsa is a village in Mikkeli, Finland, located in the northern part of the city along the Savo railway and the Finnish national road 72, near the border with the former municipality of Haukivuori.

== History ==
The name of Kalvitsa originated as a corruption of the surname Schadewitz, originally found in nearby Juva since at least 1718. In 1833, a man from Juva named Johan Schadewitz moved to the Purhola farm in the Mikkeli parish, which eventually came to be known as Kalvitsa after him.

In January 1865, the parish assembly of Mikkeli decided to establish an inn at the Kalvitsa farm. After the Savo railway was finished in 1889, the Kalvitsa railway station was opened and the village began to grow around it. The main source of income has been the timber industry; a granite quarry also existed in the 1920s. The station was closed for passengers in 1983. While open, the Kalvitsa station also served much of Juva, which is not located along any railway. After being closed, the former station building has been turned into a museum.

Kalvitsa had its own school from 1904 until 2004.
