= Mikkeli University of Applied Sciences =

Coordinates: 61.680°N 27.258°E

- Mikkelin ammattikorkeakoulu
- Type: University of applied sciences (polytechnic)
- Active: 1992–2016
- Location: Mikkeli and Savonlinna, Southern Savonia, Finland

Mikkeli University of Applied Sciences (MAMK) was a university of applied sciences in the region of Southern Savonia in Finland, located in Mikkeli and Savonlinna. It was established in 1992 and ceased to operate at the end of 2016 when it merged with Kymenlaakso University of Applied Sciences to form South-Eastern Finland University of Applied Sciences (XAMK).
