= Turku Arts Academy =

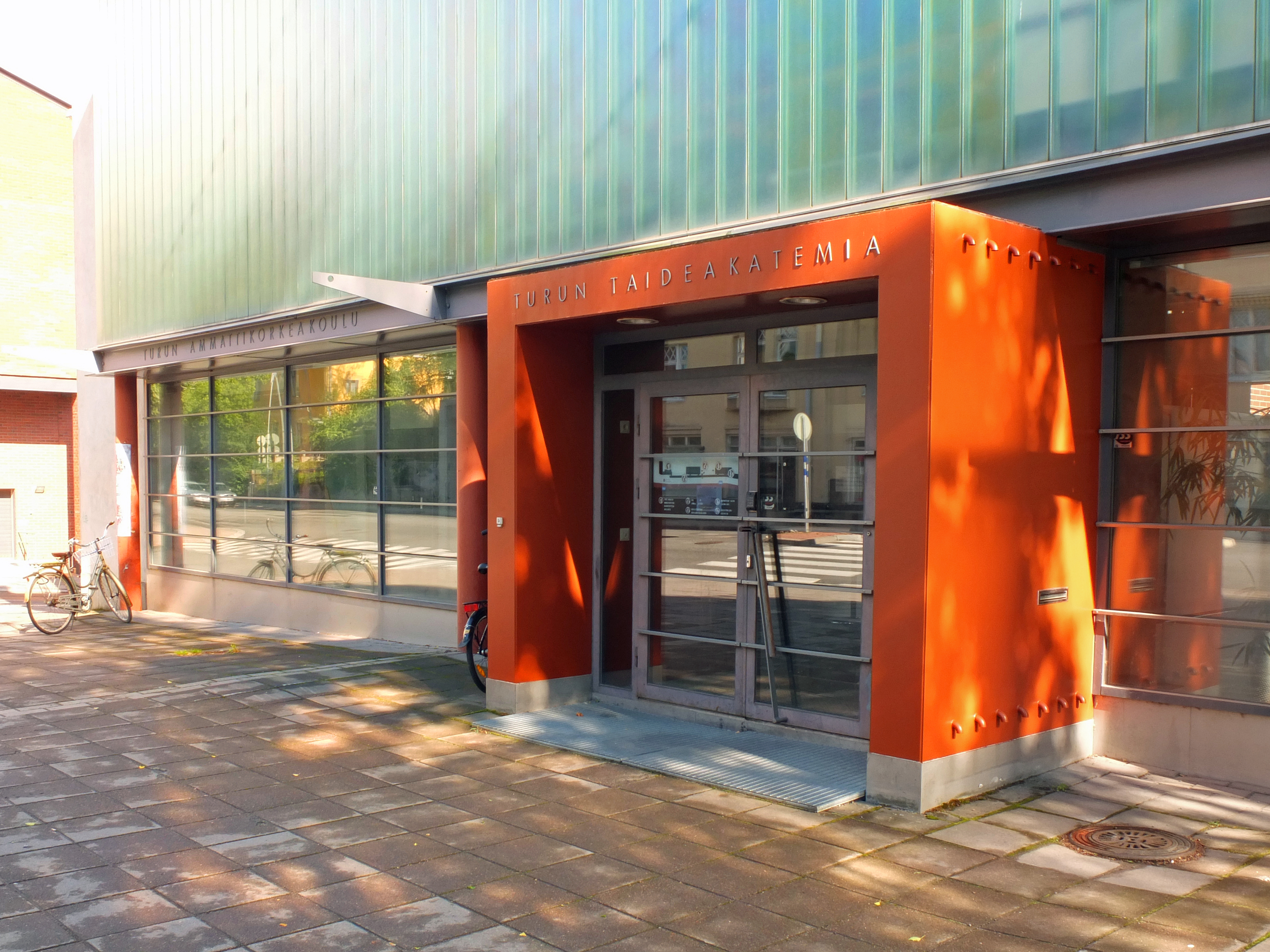
Main entrance of the Linnankatu Arts Campus of Turku Arts Academy.

Turku Arts Academy (Finnish: Turun Taideakatemia) is the arts and culture faculty of the Turku University of Applied Sciences, located in Turku, Finland.

Turku Arts Academy has around 800 students and 17 areas of specialisation. It is described as a multidisciplinary community with an extensive international network of partner institutions. The academy offers a wide range of Bachelor of Arts Programmes (240 ECTS) in the fields of arts and media, including fine arts and photography, film and media, theatre and performing arts, dance, circus, music, media production and journalism. Master's degrees are available in six different fields. Turku UAS has four research groups within the Arts Academy: Film and Media, Contemporary Art, Art Education and Art Pedagogy, and Arts, Health and Well-being. Turku Arts Academy continues the traditions of the Turku School of Fine Arts (established in 1830), the Turku Conservatoire (established in 1962), and the Turku School of Arts and Communication (established 1991).

The main campus is Linnankatu Arts Campus, located at Linnankatu 54-60 beside the Aura River, approximately 2 km from central Turku. Media students study mainly at the Kupittaa Campus.
