= South-Eastern Finland University of Applied Sciences =

Institute of higher education in Finland

Coordinates: 61.680°N 27.258°E

- Kaakkois-Suomen ammattikorkeakoulu
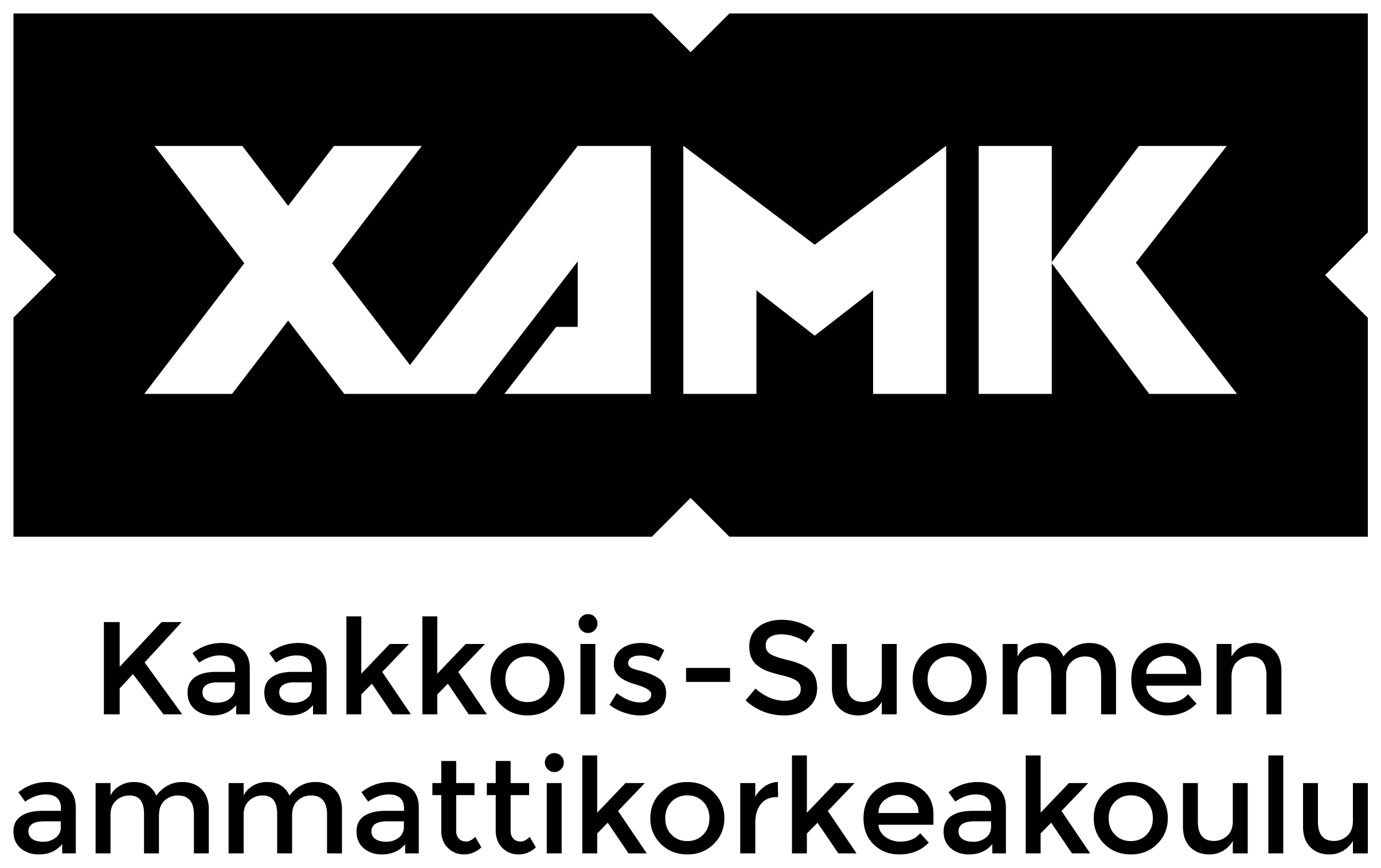
- Motto: All for the future
- Type: University of Applied Sciences (polytechnic)
- Established: 2017
- Budget: 95 million euros
- Chairman: Kimmo Mikander
- President: Heikki Saastamoinen
- Academic staff: 724
- Administrative staff: 283
- Students: 12 000
- Location: Mikkeli, Kotka, Kouvola, and Savonlinna, Southern Savonia and Kymenlaakso, Finland
- Colors: Yellow; Black
- Website: www.xamk.fi

South-Eastern Finland University of Applied Sciences (Finnish: Kaakkois-Suomen ammattikorkeakoulu, Xamk) is a University of Applied Sciences in Finland. It was established in the beginning of 2017, when Kymenlaakso University of Applied Sciences (Kyamk) and Mikkeli University of Applied Sciences (Mamk) merged. Xamk is the 3rd largest university of applied sciences in Finland with 12 300 students and over 1000 staff members across four campuses. Xamk is jointly owned by the cities of Mikkeli, Kotka, Savonlinna and Kouvola with Mikkeli holding a majority stake (52%) since August 2019.

== Education ==
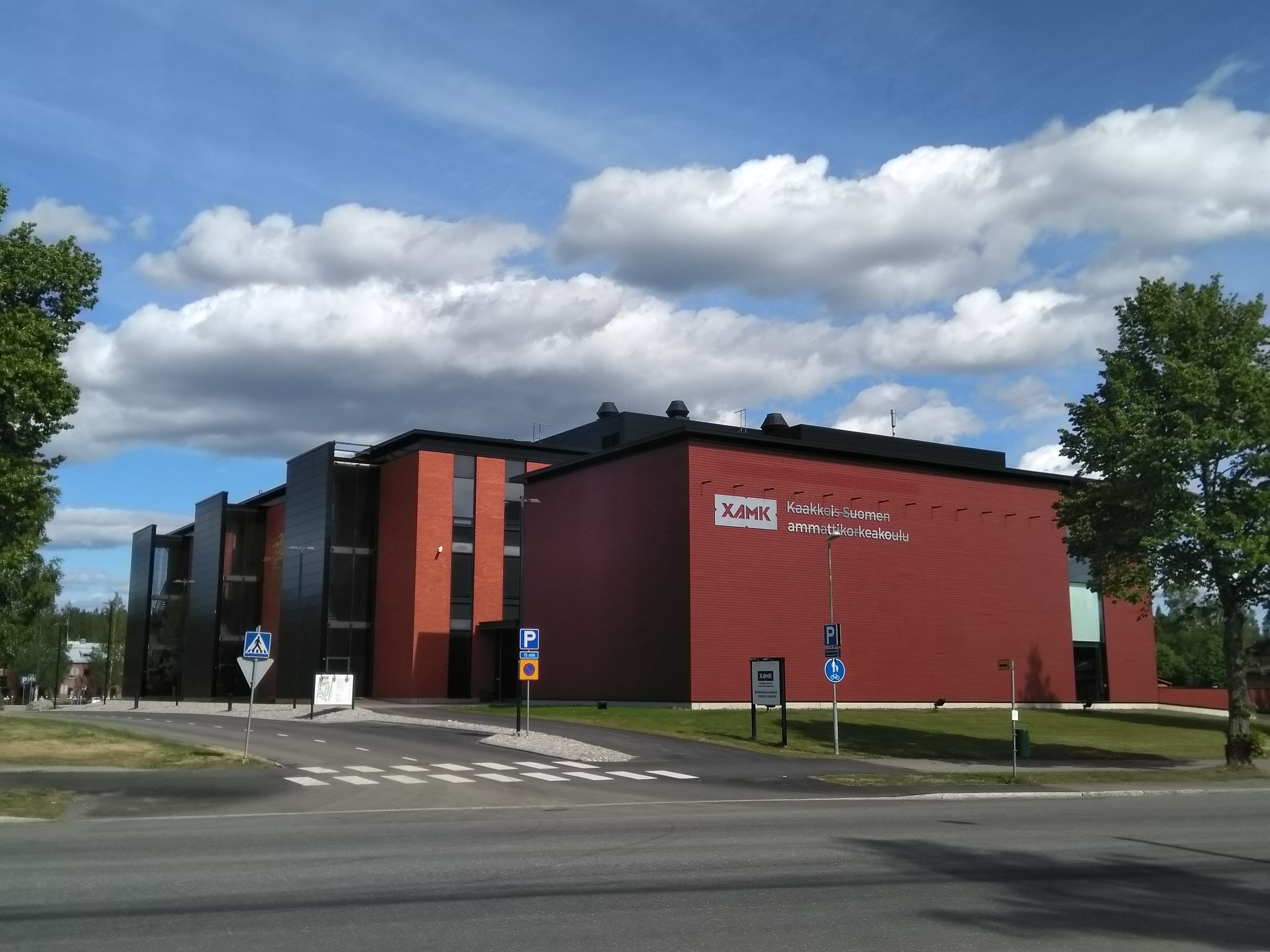
Mikkeli campus

Xamk's education, which is given on four different campuses, is closely connected to the requirements of working life and companies. As of 2024, Xamk offered in total 50 Bachelor's degree programmes and 32 Master's programmes and the number of students graduating was almost 2400.

Xamk offers 12 Bachelor's level degree programmes and 6 Master's level degree programmes in English:

Bachelor's degree programmes

- Bachelor of Business Administration, Business Analytics
- Bachelor of Business Administration, Digital International Business
- Bachelor of Culture and Arts, Game Art
- Bachelor of Culture and Arts, Game Design
- Bachelor of Engineering, Game Technologies
- Bachelor of Engineering, Information Technology
- Bachelor of Engineering, Bioproduct Technology
- Bachelor of Engineering, Efficient Supply Chain Management
- Bachelor of Engineering, Water Technology And Sustainability
- Bachelor of Hospitality Management, Tourism And Hospitality Business
- Bachelor of Health Care, Nursing
- Bachelor of Health Care, Nursing top up

Master's degree programmes

- Master of Health Care, Advanced Practice Nursing In Acute Care
- Master of Social Services and Health Care, Disaster Management
- Master of Engineering, Master of Business Administration, Strategic Supply Chain Management
- Master of Engineering, Master of Business Administration, Digital Industry And Ai
- Master of Culture and Arts, Virtual Production
- Master of Business Administration, International Business Management

== Research and development ==
The goal of the research, development, and innovation (RDI) activities at South-Eastern Finland University of Applied Sciences is to strengthen and renew the vitality of South Savo and Kymenlaakso in particular. The cornerstones of Xamk's RDI activities are the environment and sustainability, people and user-orientedness, entrepreneurship, and high added value. The aim of these activities is to support companies and create new entrepreneurship.

The university's strengths in RDI are the Digital Economy, Sustainable Wellbeing, the Circular Economy, Energy, Logistics, the Forest Bioeconomy, Materials, and the environment. Xamk describes itself as a pioneer in oil spill response, wood fiber processing, and user-driven design. In addition, it conducts youth research aimed at equality and develops environmentally safe solutions for growing industries.

Xamk has approximately 250 projects underway each year, employing around 300 experts who conduct research into the needs of businesses and working life by searching for, testing, and developing new products and services. In addition, RDI activities have 1,056 partners, 500 of which are companies. Other partners include organizations, public bodies, universities, universities of applied sciences, and research institutes. In addition to research and development projects, there are a total of 12 research units in various areas of strength, which provide a wide range of product development, measurement, and analysis services for the needs of working life and the business sector. The university's RDI activities received €19.9 million in external funding in 2024, which is among the highest in the country.

The university's research and development work includes a reliable, critical, and high-quality delivery process, which results in peer-reviewed publications that support learning. Xamk has four different publication series: Xamk Tutkii & Beyond, Xamk Kehittää, Xamk Inspiroi, and Xamk Oppimateriaalit. The purpose of publishing is to increase the impact and usability of university of applied sciences education, working life, and regional development.
