= Anjan Puisto =

Arboretum in Mikkeli, Finland

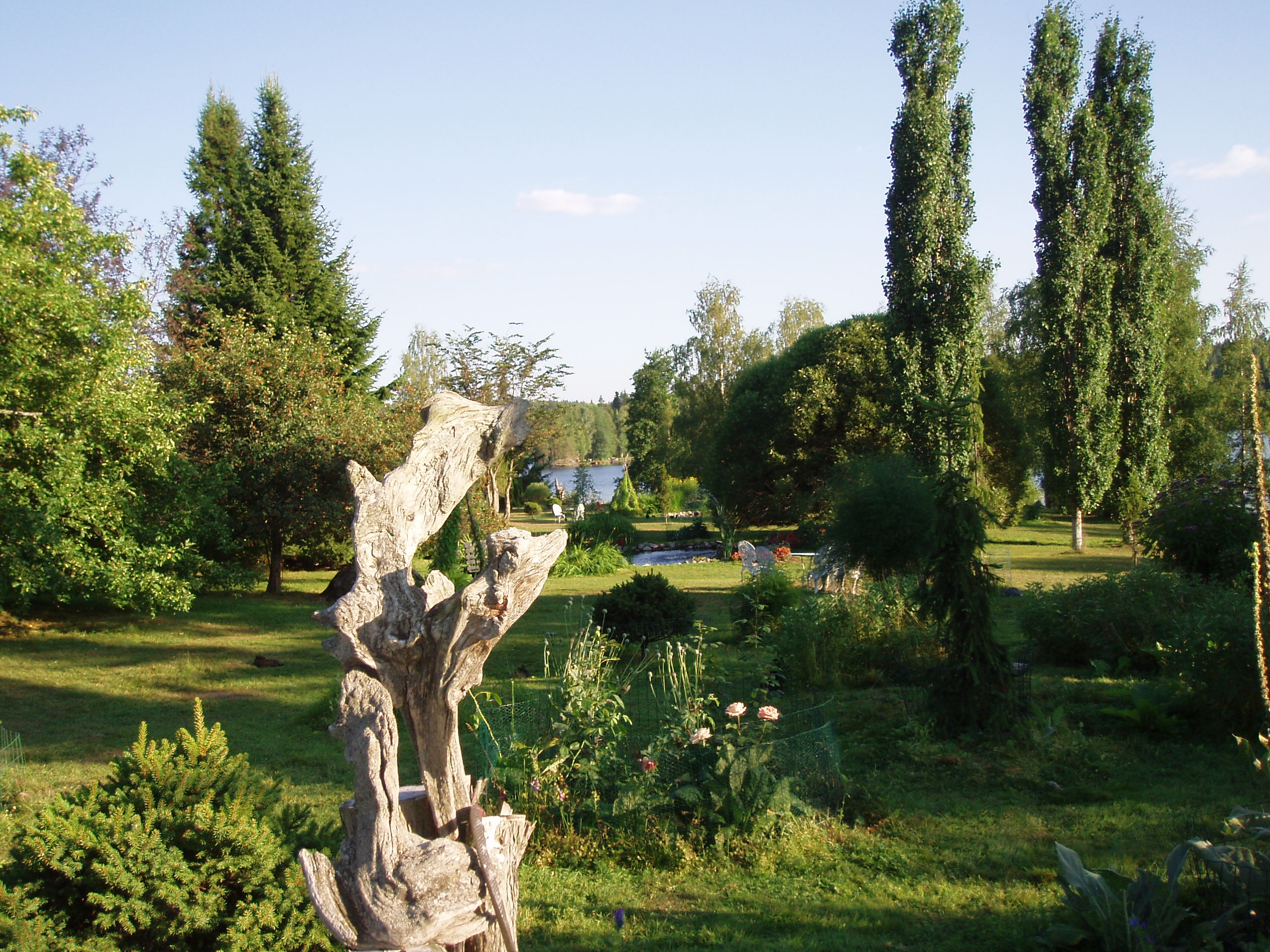
- Interactive map of Anjan Puisto
- Type: Arboretum
- Location: Mikkeli, Finland
- Coordinates: 61°39′11″N 27°22′36″E
- Area: 7 hectares (17 acres)
- Established: 1968
- Founder: Anja Laaksonen
- Designer: Anja Laaksonen
- Status: Closed for visitors

Anjan Puisto is an arboretum near the town of Mikkeli, Finland, founded by artist Anja Laaksonen in 1968. The arboretum is known for its variance of different features ranging from tree and plant species to statues, paintings, ponds and animals.

== History ==
"I do like animals. I could never kill anything. If a worm comes up when I'm digging with a shovel, I'll cover it back up so it won't die."

— Anja Laaksonen on working on Anjan Puisto.

Anjan Puisto was found by Anja Laaksonen in 1968 in Anttola, Mikkeli, when she planted the first tree. According to Anja, what was initially supposed to be a "small yard" "turned out to be a little bigger" as she kept on developing the land: "When you got a piece of land ready, the one next to it looked even more dull. So you had to keep it up." Alongside landscaping and gardening, Anja created works of art by painting and sculpting, well as from natural rocks, tree trunks and rootstocks. In 1999, a barn burned down in a violent fire in Anjan Puisto. The arboretum was closed for visitors in 2020 after Anja passed away.

== Description ==
Anjan Puisto has a size of approximately seven hectares. The arboretum is located in a hilly area on an isthmus between the lakes of Ala-Säynätjärvi and Iso-Palvanen. It features 28 ponds, all self-dug by Anja, some with fountains in them. The animals of the arboretum have included partridges, pheasants, peacocks, chickens, turkeys, rabbits, pigs, cows, sheep, and a dog named Rihanna.

The trees of Anjan Puisto include species such as Pinus peuce, Betula pubescens f. rubra, Picea abies f. pendula, Betula pendula 'Youngii', Picea abies f. aurea, Quercus robur, Salix euxina 'Bullata', Picea mariana, Picea pungens, Phellodendron amurense, Picea abies f. virgata,, Picea abies 'Sampon pallo', Alnus incana 'Pendula', Populus tremula 'Erecta', and Ulmus glabra 'Exoniensis'. There are also various flowerbeds in the arboretum.
