= Multiconsult =

Norwegian engineering consultancy

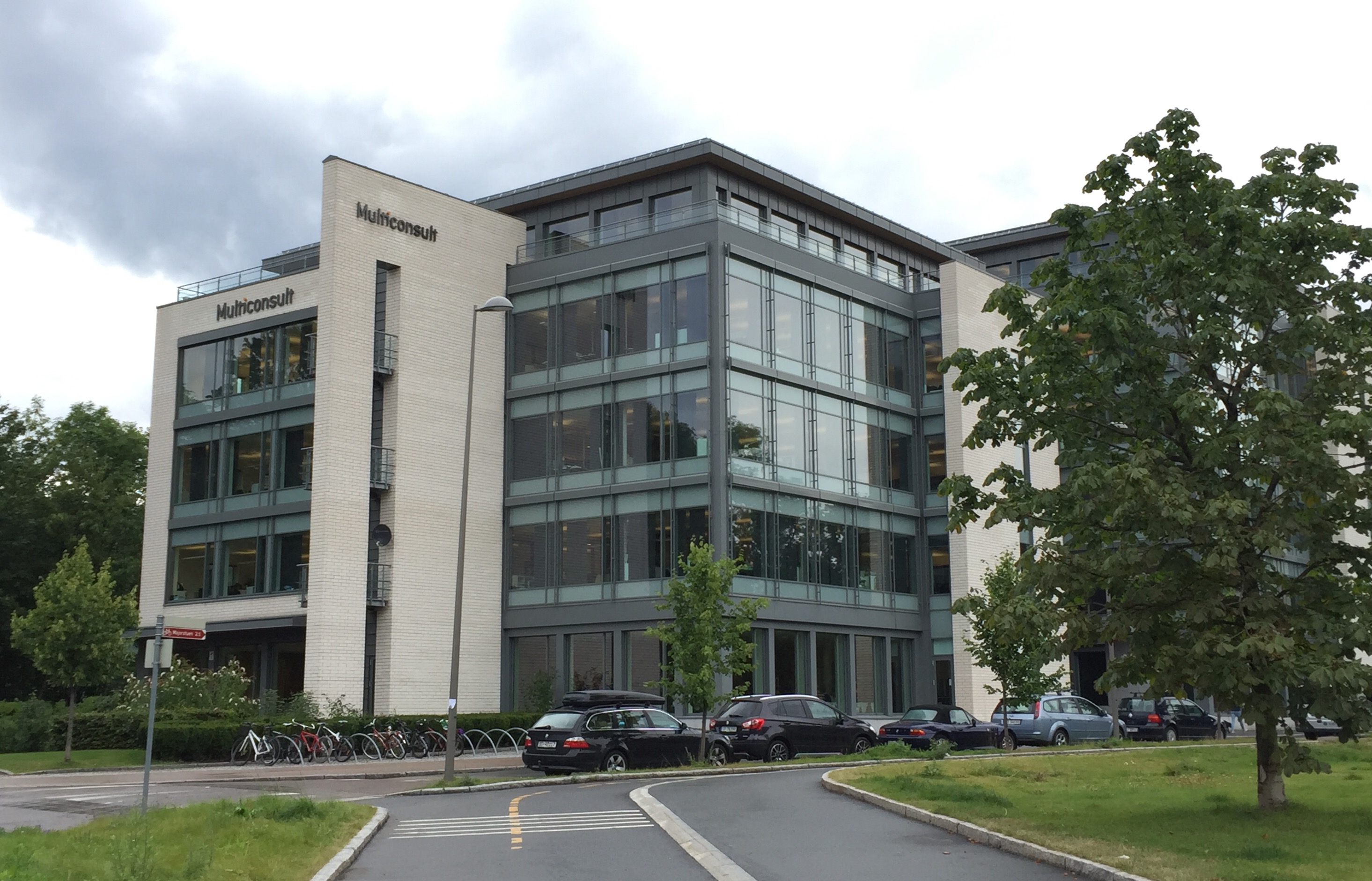
- Type: Allmennaksjeselskap
- Traded as: OSE: MULTI
- Industry: Engineering; Consultancy
- Founded: Oslo, Norway (1908)
- Headquarters: Oslo, Norway
- Key people: Grethe Bergly, CEO
- Revenue: NOK 2,97 bn (2017)
- Net income: ▲NOK 118 million (2017)
- Number of employees: 2 800
- Website: www.multiconsultgroup.com

Multiconsult is an engineering consultancy with approximately 2800 employees operating in Norway, elsewhere in Europe and globally. The company is listed on the Oslo Stock Exchange.

In addition to its headquarters in Skøyen, Oslo, Multiconsult has local offices in several Norwegian cities. Multiconsult also operates elsewhere in Europe, Africa and Asia. In 2015, Multiconsult acquired Link Arkitektur, one of the largest architecture firms in Scandinavia.

A merger between Multiconsult and Swedish engineering consultancy firm Rejlers was announced in 2026. The new group will be called Multiconsult Rejlers.

== History ==
Multiconsult traces its origins from the founding of Norsk Vandbygningskontor (NVK) in 1908. NVK merged with Multiconsult in 2003. The name of Multiconsult stems from 1974 when Sivilingeniørene Apeland & Mjøset AS was reorganised and Stiftelsen Multiconsult became a major shareholder.

Owners of Multiconsult as of 2015:
1. Multiconsult Foundation (22.5%)
2. Swedbank (3.80%)
3. Tycoon Industrier (3.70%)
4. Odin Norge (3.40%)
5. OBOS (3.40%)
6. Others (63.2%)
