= Tampere University of Applied Sciences =

Institute of higher education in Pirkanmaa, Finland

Coordinates: 61.504°N 23.809°E

- Tampereen ammattikorkeakoulu
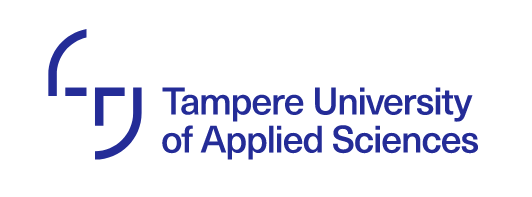
- Motto in English: Human potential unlimited
- Type: University of applied sciences (polytechnic)
- Established: 1996
- President: Mikko Naukkarinen
- Location: Tampere, Finland
- Website: www.tuni.fi/en

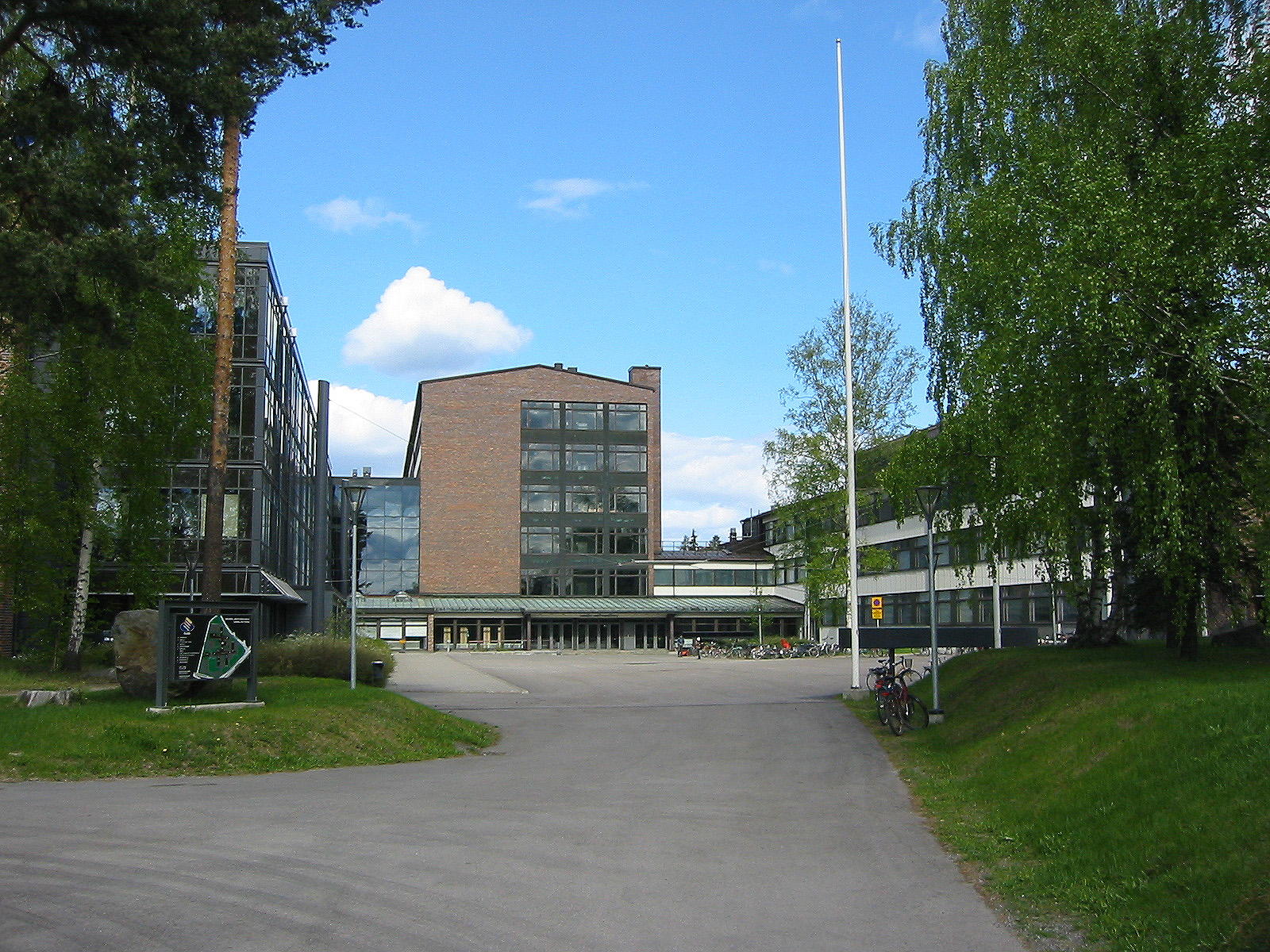
TAMK's main campus

Tampere University of Applied Sciences (Finnish: Tampereen ammattikorkeakoulu, TAMK) is a university of applied sciences (a polytechnic) in the region of Pirkanmaa, Finland. Together with Tampere University, they constitute the Tampere higher education community.

Founded in 1996, TAMK merged with the Pirkanmaa University of Applied Sciences in 2010. TAMK's main campus is located in the city of Tampere, 3 kilometres (1.9 mi) from the city centre. There is one other smaller campus in Tampere, Mediapolis, focusing on Media and Arts education.

== Education ==
TAMK has almost 10,000 students divided among over forty degree programmes, of which around fifteen are conducted in English.

TAMK offers education in nine fields of study. TAMK's educational provision focuses particularly on wellbeing and health, business, and industrial production, with special emphasis on promoting learning and creativity.

== Faculties ==
TAMK comprises five faculties:

- Faculty of Built Environment and Bioeconomy
- Faculty of Business and Media
- Faculty of Industrial Engineering
- Faculty of Pedagogic Innovations and Culture
- Faculty of Social Services and Health Care

== Academic collaboration ==
TAMK has collaboration with more than 300 universities in fifty countries. TAMK takes part in several mobility programmes, e.g. Erasmus +, Nordplus, and has strategic partnerships with some higher education institutions in Europe. TAMK Global Education Services provides vocational and higher education services to TAMK's partners around the world.

One form of academic collaboration is also TAMK's RDI cooperation with international partners.
