= Mikkeli Airport =

Mikkeli Airport Mikkelin lentoasema
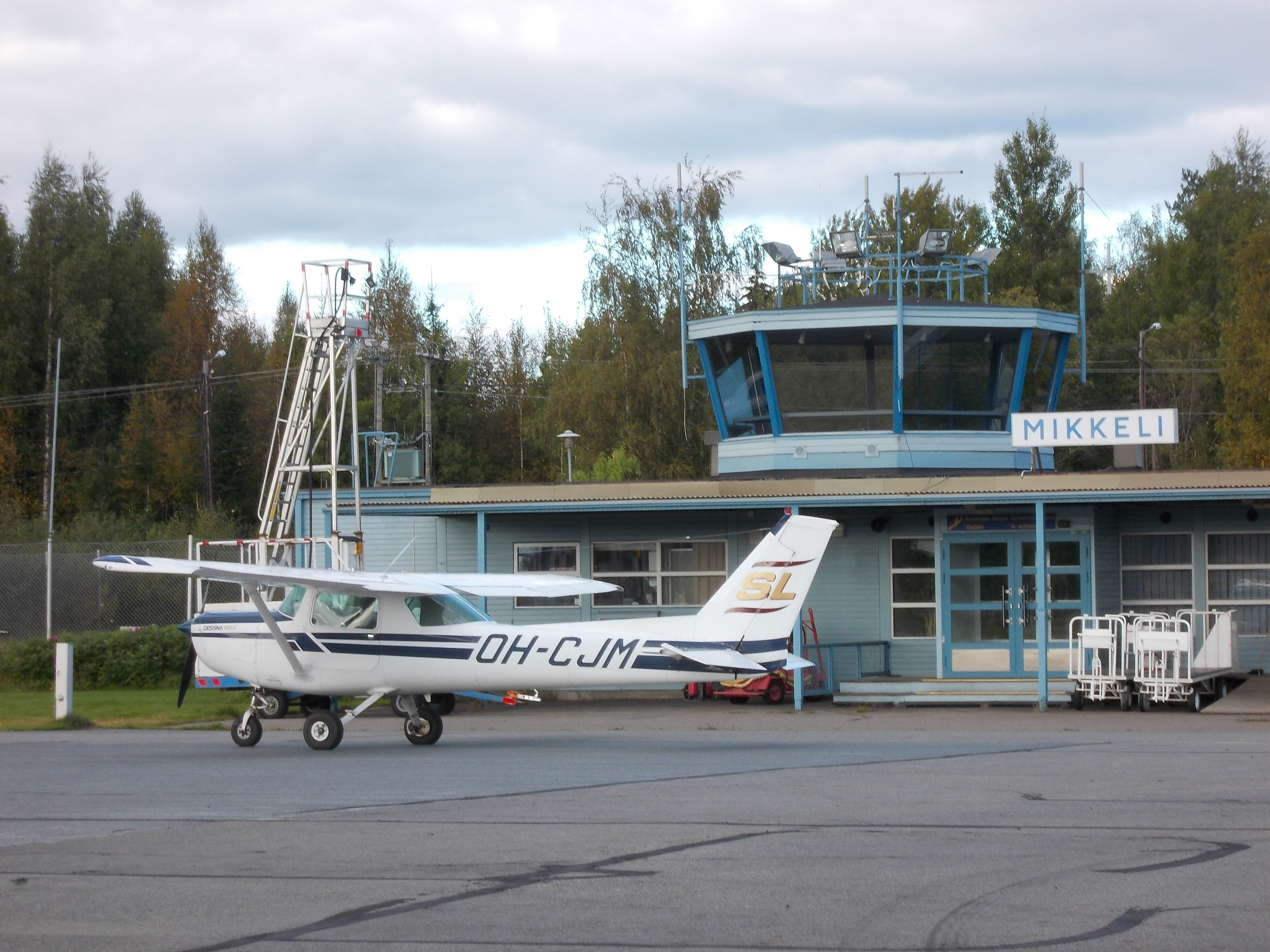
- IATA: MIK; ICAO: EFMI

Summary
- Airport type: Public
- Operator: City of Mikkeli
- Location: Mikkeli, Finland
- Elevation AMSL: 330 ft / 101 m
- Coordinates: 61°41′11″N 027°12′00″E
- Website: www.mikkeli.fi/sisalto/palvelut/elinkeinot/lentoasema

Map
- Location within Finland

Runways
Direction	Length		Surface
Direction	m	ft	Surface
11/29	1,702	5,584	Asphalt

Statistics (2010)
- Passengers: 1,214
- Landings: 1,395
- Source: AIP Finland; Statistics from Finavia

Mikkeli Airport (IATA: MIK, ICAO: EFMI) is located in Mikkeli, Finland, 2.5 NM (4.6 km; 2.9 mi) west of the city centre. There are no regular scheduled flights to the airport. In the summer, there are a large number of gliding, powered flight and parachute jumping activities at the airport.

== Facilities ==
There is one runway (11/29) in the airport and its measures are 1,702 m × 44 m (5,584 ft × 144 ft). Runway 11 is also equipped with an instrument landing system.
