= Kymenlaakso University of Applied Sciences =

Defunct Finnish university of applied sciences

- Kymenlaakson ammattikorkeakoulu
- Type: University of applied sciences (polytechnic)
- Active: 1996–2016
- Location: Kotka and Kouvola, Kymenlaakso, Finland

Kymenlaakso University of Applied Sciences (KyAMK) was a university of applied sciences located in Kotka, in the region of Kymenlaakso in Finland. Kymenlaakso University of Applied Sciences was established in 1996, and ceased to operate at the end of 2016, when it merged with Mikkeli University of Applied Sciences to form South-Eastern Finland University of Applied Sciences (Xamk).
