= University of applied sciences (Finland) =

Finnish institution of higher education

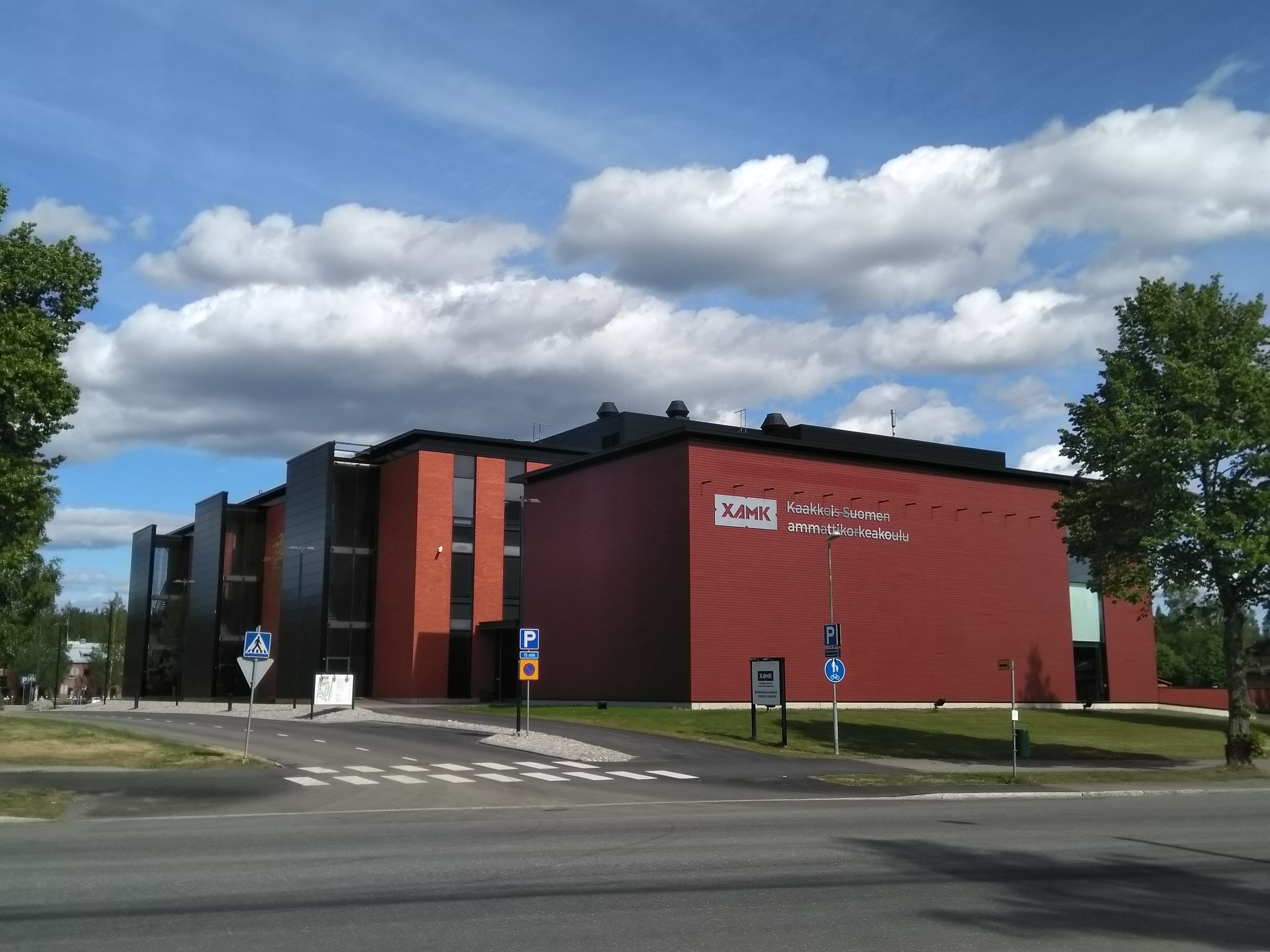
Xamk UAS campus building in Mikkeli

The University of Applied Sciences (Note: Polytechnic before 2006.) (UAS; Finnish: ammattikorkeakoulu (AMK); Swedish: yrkeshögskola) in Finland is a type of institute of higher education offering tertiary level instruction with a heavy emphasis on professional practice. The UAS are qualitatively different from Finnish universities.

Unlike universities, the UAS focus on R&D by applying previous knowledge, rather than scientific discovery. They have a statutory objective in regional development. As there is mandatory five-month practical training for all students, the UAS are a platform for dispersing applied knowledge throughout higher education. The UAS provide professionals for locally important purposes and are often governed by the municipality, though they receive most of the funding from the state. No tuition fees are required from the students from EU/EEA.

== History ==
Before the AMK reform in 1993, the schools were usually called opisto and were considered vocational institutes, and were not considered universities. Their role was to give training for roles that need both practical skills and management work, such as a foreman in construction. In engineering, the degree was referred to as opistoinsinööri or teknikko. In construction, there was rakennusinsinööri, rakennusarkkitehti and rakennusmestari.

Until recently, the UAS were granting only tertiary degrees (3–4 years) that are specialized to particular vocations (e.g. insinööri, translated into English as Bachelor of Engineering); they are different from, but in their level comparable to, academic bachelor's degrees which are awarded by universities. In 2005, "higher AMK" degrees (which are translated into English as master's degrees) have been introduced for holders of a UAS degree or a similar degree, like a bachelor's degree from a university, to continue studies while also working. The UAS do not grant the higher degrees of licentiate and Ph.D. granted by universities, and a holder of an UAS higher degree might need specific studies bridging the gap between the two orientations (academic and vocational) in order to be eligible for doctoral studies in universities. This is, however, not always the case.

In recent years, UAS have been a major driver of internationalisation of higher education in Finland. Most English-taught Bachelor programmes are offered by universitied of applied sciences, and UAS attract more international students than universities.

== Overview ==
As of April 2026, 22 universities of applied sciences operate under the direct administration of the Finnish Ministry of Education and Culture. In addition, Åland administers Högskolan på Åland and the Police University of Applied Sciences in Tampere is under the jurisdiction of the Ministry of the Interior, making the total sum 24 across the country. The five most popular polytechnics in Finland (as of 2020) are Metropolia, Tampere UAS, Haaga-Helia, Turku UAS, and XAMK respectively.

The specific degree programs offered by the UAS varies and is largely based on local vocational needs and capacities, however, every UAS generally offers undergraduate as well as postgraduate programs in the fields of arts, culture, healthcare, business and technology, such as degree programs in design, nursing, engineering, business management, and social work. Other fields include pedagogy, agriculture, forestry, and public services.

There are about 140,000 students in universities of applied sciences across Finland.

== Pursuing further studies ==
The Finnish tertiary education system follows a “dual model”, where Finnish universities are tasked with scientific research and producing new knowledge whereas the UAS have a more vocational or R&D orientation. In light of this difference, tertiary level degrees—such as bachelor's and master's—are indeed offered by the UAS, but they are not equivalent to Finnish university degrees per-se and inherent differences between the two institutes become especially apparent when a student wishes to make a shift from the former to the latter. Because degrees from a UAS are more oriented towards practical applications, if a holder of a UAS bachelor's degree applies for a master's degree in a Finnish university and is admitted, they may still be obliged to complete up to 60 ECTS worth of theoretical studies in addition to the formal master's degree requirement, depending on the student's background.

Since 2005, the Finnish Parliament has approved the creation of a higher UAS degree, that parallels the master's degree in universities. This has led to a small-scale boost in new degree programmes (in limited fields of education), to the extent of 60-90 ECTS credits. They will give similar qualifications as a university master's degree in the same areas of education. But a minimum amount of two years of work experience gained after the latest tertiary degree is needed to qualify for a UAS higher degree programme.

== Issues ==
At the end of 2010, there were nationwide discussions about the excessive number of students in the UAS, especially in the fields of Engineering and Business. This is connected to a problem in funding — the UAS receive their funding largely based on the students enrollment numbers (this is changing to a more management-by-results approach). This has led to an oversupply of UAS-educated people, compared to the needs of the labour market — the unemployment of UAS graduates is 8%, on par with the general unemployment rate. Some cuts to the number of student places were issued by the Ministry of Education, starting with a nationwide cut of 10% applied to the new student intake in 2007 and 2008.

The universities of applied science in Finland have been severely criticized for being too undemanding when offering degrees to new graduates as well as for lacking quality education.

== Nomenclature ==
The English name "university of applied sciences" or the acronym "UAS" was universally applied on January 1, 2006, to all Finnish polytechnics. The name is borrowed from the English translation of the German "Fachhochschule". There is no legislation concerning the translation of the name. However, perhaps a more linguistically accurate direct translation would be "advanced vocational institute".

== See also ==
- Education in Finland
- List of universities in Finland
- Tampere University of Applied Sciences
- Vocational university
- HAMK Häme University of Applied Sciences
- Haaga-Helia University of Applied Sciences
