= Haukivuori =

- Former municipality
- Haukivuoren kunta Haukivuori kommun
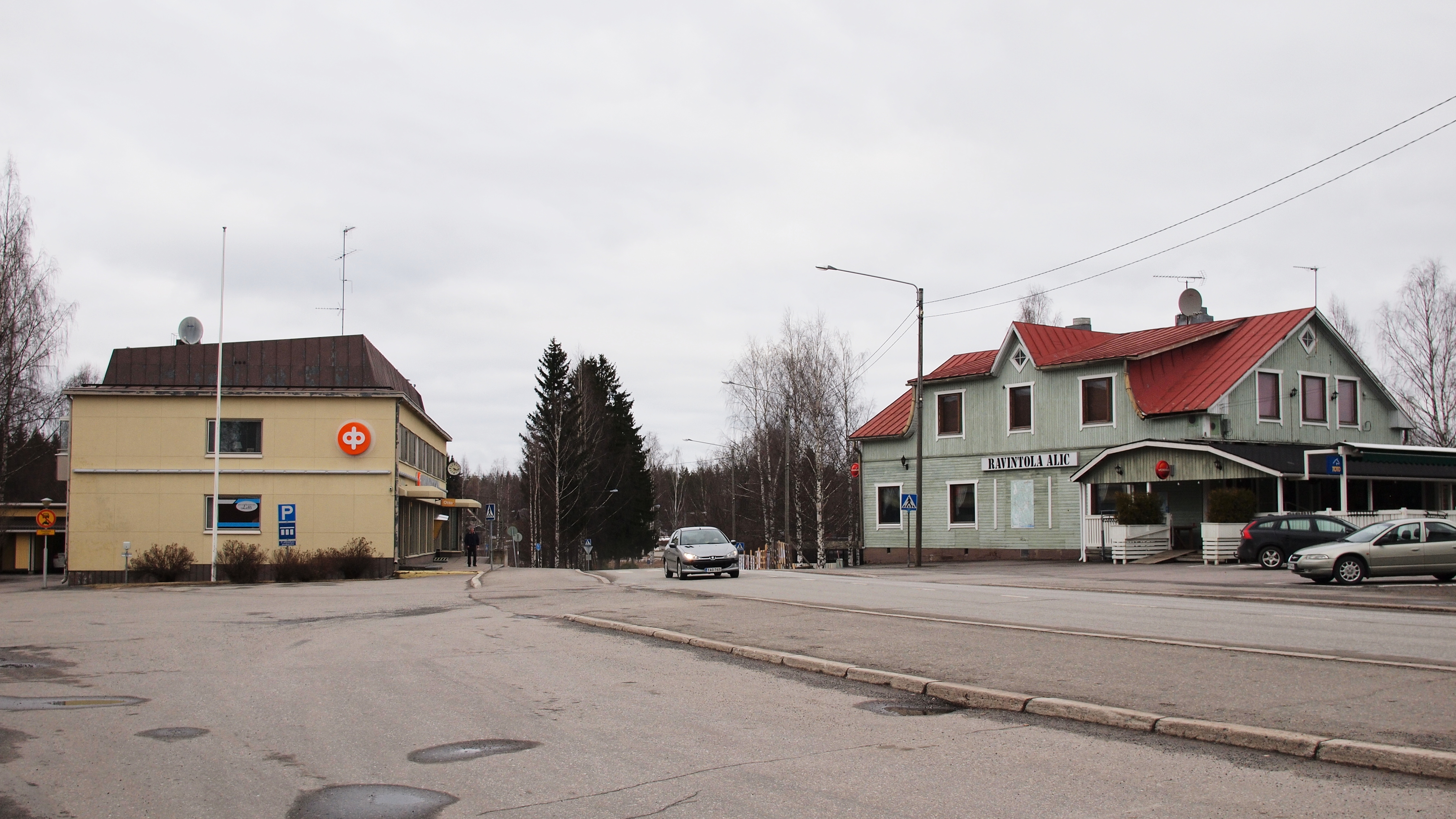

- Coat of arms

- Coordinates: 62°01′15″N 027°12′30″E
- Country: Finland
- Region: Southern Savonia
- Sub-region: Mikkeli sub-region
- Established: 1737
- Consolidated: 2007

Area
  - Total: 504.03 km^{2} (194.61 sq mi)
  - Land: 396.65 km^{2} (153.15 sq mi)
  - Water: 107.38 km^{2} (41.46 sq mi)

Population
  - Total: 2,292
  - Density: 5.778/km^{2} (14.97/sq mi)
- Time zone: UTC+2 (EET)
  - Summer (DST): UTC+3 (EEST)

Haukivuori is a former municipality of Finland located in the province of Eastern Finland and part of the Southern Savonia region. The municipality had a population of 2,361 and covered an area of 505.11 km^{2}, of which 108.07 km^{2} is water. The population density was 4.7 inhabitants per km^{2}. On 1 January 2007, Haukivuori was incorporated into the city of Mikkeli.

Haukivuori center is c. 41 km by road from Mikkeli center. Kouvola-Iisalmi railway line goes through Haukivuori.

The municipality was unilingually Finnish.

== People born in Haukivuori ==
- Sari Essayah (1967–)
