= Mikkeli =

Town in South Savo, Finland

Mikkeli S:t Michel
- City
- Mikkelin kaupunki S:t Michels stad
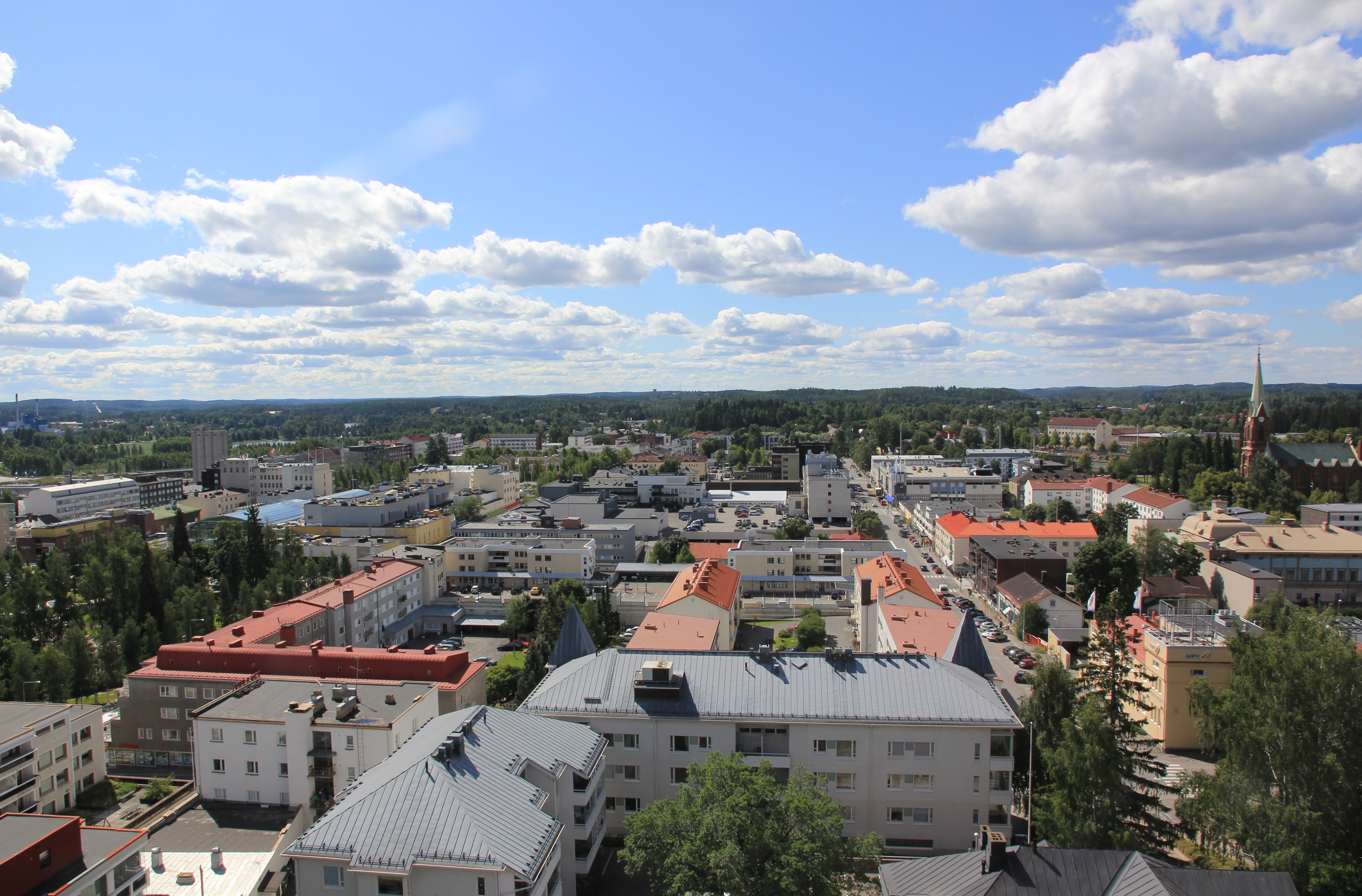

- Coat of arms
- Interactive map of Mikkeli
- Coordinates: 61.689°N 27.272°E
- Country: Finland
- Region: South Savo
- Sub-region: Mikkeli
- Charter: 1838

Government
  - Type: Council-manager
  - Body: City Council
  - Chairman: Oskari Valtola (NCP)
  - City Board Chairwoman: Pirjo Siiskonen
  - Mayor: Janne Kinnunen

Area (2018-01-01)
  - Total: 3,229.57 km^{2} (1,246.94 sq mi)
  - Land: 2,548.35 km^{2} (983.92 sq mi)
  - Water: 424.7 km^{2} (164.0 sq mi)
  - Rank: 23rd largest in Finland

Population (2025-12-31)
  - Total: 51,551
  - Rank: 18th largest in Finland
  - Density: 20.23/km^{2} (52.4/sq mi)

Population by native language
  - Finnish: 93% (official)
  - Swedish: 0.2%
  - Others: 6.9%

Population by age
  - 0 to 14: 13.9%
  - 15 to 64: 58.9%
  - 65 or older: 27.2%
- Time zone: UTC+02:00 (EET)
  - Summer (DST): UTC+03:00 (EEST)
- Website: www.mikkeli.fi

Mikkeli (Finnish: [ˈmikːeli]; Swedish: S:t Michel) is a city in, and the regional capital of, South Savo, Finland, located in the Finnish Lakeland. The population is approximately 52,000, while the Mikkeli sub-region of South Savo has a population of approximately 68,000. Mikkeli is the 18th most-populous municipality of Finland and the 19th most-populous urban area in the country.

Mikkeli is located on the shores of Lake Saimaa, the largest lake in the country, and Europe's fourth largest. Prior to being located within South Savo, the city was in Mikkeli Province (until 1997), before becoming part of Eastern Finland Province (1997-2009). The city covers an area of 3,229.57 square kilometres (1,246.94 sq mi), of which 424.7 km^{2} (164.0 sq mi) is water. Mikkeli is one of the largest towns in the South Savo region, and one of the main hubs in the region's hospital districts, along with Savonlinna.

During World War II, Mikkeli served as the headquarters for the Finnish Defence Forces, thus the town's coat of arms features a pair of crossed Marshal C. G. E. Mannerheim batons in honour of the armed forces. The town was awarded the Cross of Liberty, 4th Class, which is displayed alongside the coat of arms.

== History ==
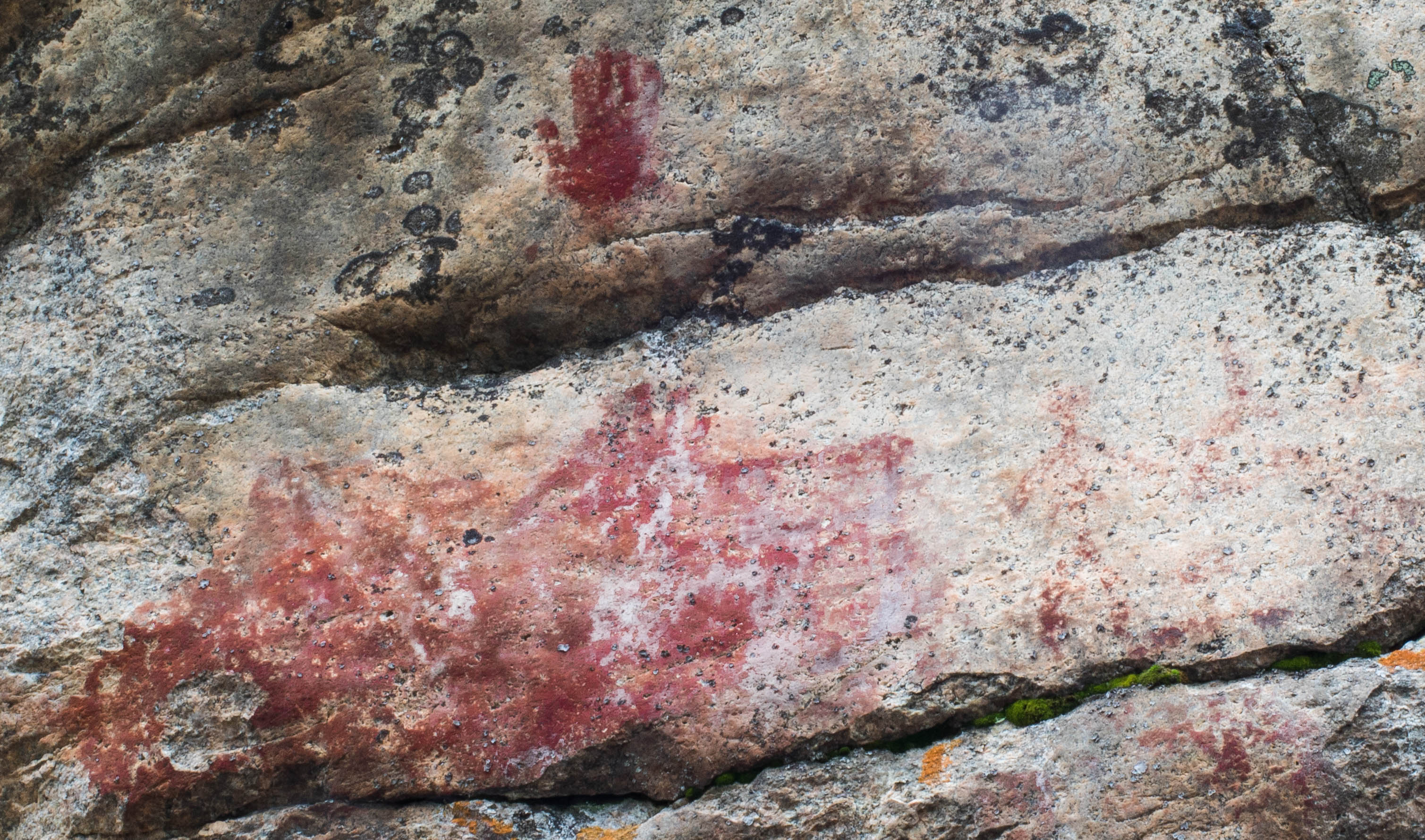
Astuvansalmi rock paintings

The earliest signs of human life in Mikkeli are the Astuvansalmi rock paintings in Ristiina, dating back to 4100-2000 BCE. The Astuvansalmi is the largest rock painting site in the Nordic countries.

The peace treaty of Nöteborg in 1323, with which the pogost (church parish) of Savilahti was transferred from the control of Novgorod to Sweden, is the oldest written record of the settlement in the present region of Mikkeli. The locality received its present name Mikkeli after Archangel Michael by the early 16th century at the latest.

On 23 January 1597, more than 200 peasant rebels were killed in the parsonage of Kenkävero in part of the larger Cudgel War. In the war waged by King Gustav III of Sweden against Russia, the Battle of Porrassalmi took place a few miles south of Mikkeli on 13 June 1789. In the battle the Swedes (Finns) victoriously defended their positions against superior numbers of Russians.

Mikkeli was granted town rights in 1838. The provincial government of the province of Mikkeli that had been established in 1831, moved from Heinola to Mikkeli in 1843.

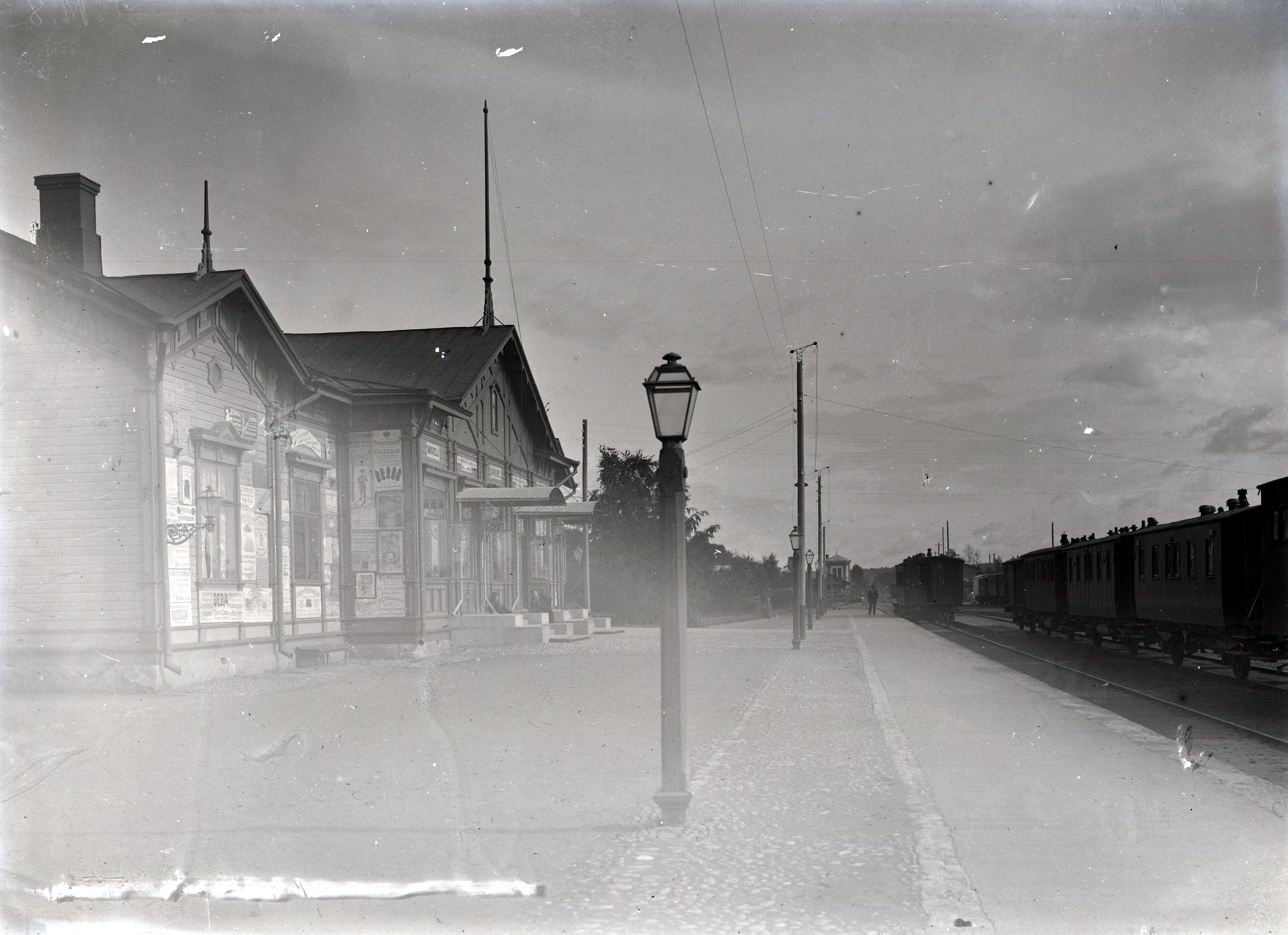
Mikkeli railway station in the early 20th century

In 1918, during the Civil War, the headquarters of the White Army were established in Mikkeli. Mikkeli was located in a conservative farming area and it was a White stronghold, but elements of the Russian Army garrison in the area supported the Reds. A major engagement was fought around the railway station at Mäntyharju, about 20 km (12 mi) to the south of Mikkeli, when the Whites blocked a Red thrust coming north out of Kouvola. During the Winter War and Continuation War, the headquarters of the Finnish Army was located in Mikkeli. The Army staff made their base in a local secondary school. At the site of that school is the small Päämajamuseo (Finnish for 'Headquarters Museum') containing photographs and memorabilia of the era. As a result of serving as the headquarters of the army that was based there, Mikkeli was bombed heavily, but since there was almost no high-rise development at the time the damage was quickly repaired. Architecturally, most of pre-war Mikkeli doesn't exist anymore.

President Risto Ryti (left) and prime minister J. W. Rangell (behind Ryti) on their first visit to Marshal Mannerheim (center) at headquarters in Mikkeli in 1941

Wartime Mikkeli is identified with Marshal C. G. E. Mannerheim, the supreme commander of the Finnish Defence Forces and later President of Finland. His personal railway carriage, which he used as a command post during the war, is parked in a siding at Mikkeli Station. It is possible to look inside the carriage through its windows at any time, but public entry to the carriage is permitted only once a year, on Mannerheim's birthday (4 June). The carriage was the venue of Mannerheim's famous 1942 meeting with Hitler near Immola, during which their private conversation was secretly recorded; photographs of this meeting are on display in the carriage. Mannerheim was a regular diner at the Mikkelin Klubi, where his favourite drink was schnapps.

One of the main museums in the town is the Jalkaväkimuseo (Finnish for 'Infantry Museum'), located in one of the former army barracks, close to the University of Applied Sciences. It contains exhibits from the four wars in Finland's modern history – the Civil, Winter, Continuation and Lapland Wars. The museum also contains an exhibit dedicated to Finnish war hero Lauri Törni.

In 1986, there was a hostage crisis in Mikkeli when a bank robber drove from Helsinki with three hostages and parked there. When the police shot at the hostage taker's car he detonated explosives contained inside, killing himself and one hostage.

In 1997, there was a province reform, which made Mikkeli the capital of the new province of Eastern Finland. In a separate reform, the rural municipality of Mikkeli which had surrounded the town and the municipality of Anttola were consolidated into Mikkeli in early 2001. The municipality of Haukivuori was consolidated with Mikkeli on 1 January 2007, and likewise with Ristiina and Suomenniemi in 2013.

In 2024, there were plans to establish a sub-staff of ground forces working under the military alliance in Mikkeli following Finland's admission into NATO. NATO's Multi-Corps Land Component Command (MCLCC) began operations on 1 September 2025 and its official opening ceremony was held on 3 October 2025.

== Geography ==
Map of urban Mikkeli

The centre of Mikkeli is located on a low rise, near the shore of a bay of Lake Saimaa. There are several smaller lakes in and around the town; the lakes to the east of town belong to the River Vuoksi system, while to the west, the town reaches Lake Puula, which belongs to the system of the River Kymijoki.

=== Climate ===
Mikkeli has a subarctic climate (Dfc), bordering on humid continental (Dfb), as May and September average just slightly below 10˚C (50˚F).

Climate data for Mikkeli Airport (1991–2020, extremes 1959–present)
Month	Jan	Feb	Mar	Apr	May	Jun	Jul	Aug	Sep	Oct	Nov	Dec	Year
Record high °C (°F)	7.1 (44.8)	8.5 (47.3)	15.0 (59.0)	23.8 (74.8)	30.2 (86.4)	33.1 (91.6)	32.7 (90.9)	33.2 (91.8)	27.0 (80.6)	19.9 (67.8)	11.8 (53.2)	9.7 (49.5)	33.2 (91.8)
Mean maximum °C (°F)	3.0 (37.4)	3.0 (37.4)	8.6 (47.5)	17.3 (63.1)	24.6 (76.3)	26.9 (80.4)	28.1 (82.6)	26.7 (80.1)	21.0 (69.8)	13.4 (56.1)	7.8 (46.0)	4.0 (39.2)	29.2 (84.6)
Mean daily maximum °C (°F)	−4.3 (24.3)	−3.9 (25.0)	1.0 (33.8)	8.0 (46.4)	15.5 (59.9)	19.8 (67.6)	22.3 (72.1)	20.3 (68.5)	14.4 (57.9)	7.0 (44.6)	1.4 (34.5)	−2.3 (27.9)	8.3 (46.9)
Daily mean °C (°F)	−7.2 (19.0)	−7.3 (18.9)	−3.1 (26.4)	3.0 (37.4)	9.7 (49.5)	14.4 (57.9)	17.0 (62.6)	14.9 (58.8)	9.8 (49.6)	4.0 (39.2)	−0.5 (31.1)	−4.3 (24.3)	4.2 (39.6)
Mean daily minimum °C (°F)	−10.5 (13.1)	−11.0 (12.2)	−7.7 (18.1)	−1.8 (28.8)	3.3 (37.9)	8.5 (47.3)	11.4 (52.5)	9.8 (49.6)	5.5 (41.9)	1.1 (34.0)	−2.9 (26.8)	−7.5 (18.5)	−0.2 (31.6)
Mean minimum °C (°F)	−25.8 (−14.4)	−25.1 (−13.2)	−19.4 (−2.9)	−10.2 (13.6)	−4.1 (24.6)	0.8 (33.4)	5.1 (41.2)	2.9 (37.2)	−2.0 (28.4)	−8.2 (17.2)	−13.7 (7.3)	−20.1 (−4.2)	−29.0 (−20.2)
Record low °C (°F)	−37.1 (−34.8)	−37.5 (−35.5)	−36.3 (−33.3)	−24.4 (−11.9)	−8.3 (17.1)	−4.9 (23.2)	0.0 (32.0)	−3.1 (26.4)	−6.8 (19.8)	−16.3 (2.7)	−26.5 (−15.7)	−33.0 (−27.4)	−37.5 (−35.5)
Average precipitation mm (inches)	48 (1.9)	37 (1.5)	35 (1.4)	33 (1.3)	42 (1.7)	69 (2.7)	78 (3.1)	70 (2.8)	54 (2.1)	64 (2.5)	56 (2.2)	54 (2.1)	639 (25.2)
Average precipitation days (≥ 1.0 mm)	12	10	9	7	8	11	11	10	9	12	12	13	124
Source 1: FMI normals 1991-2020
Source 2: Record highs and lows

== Economy ==
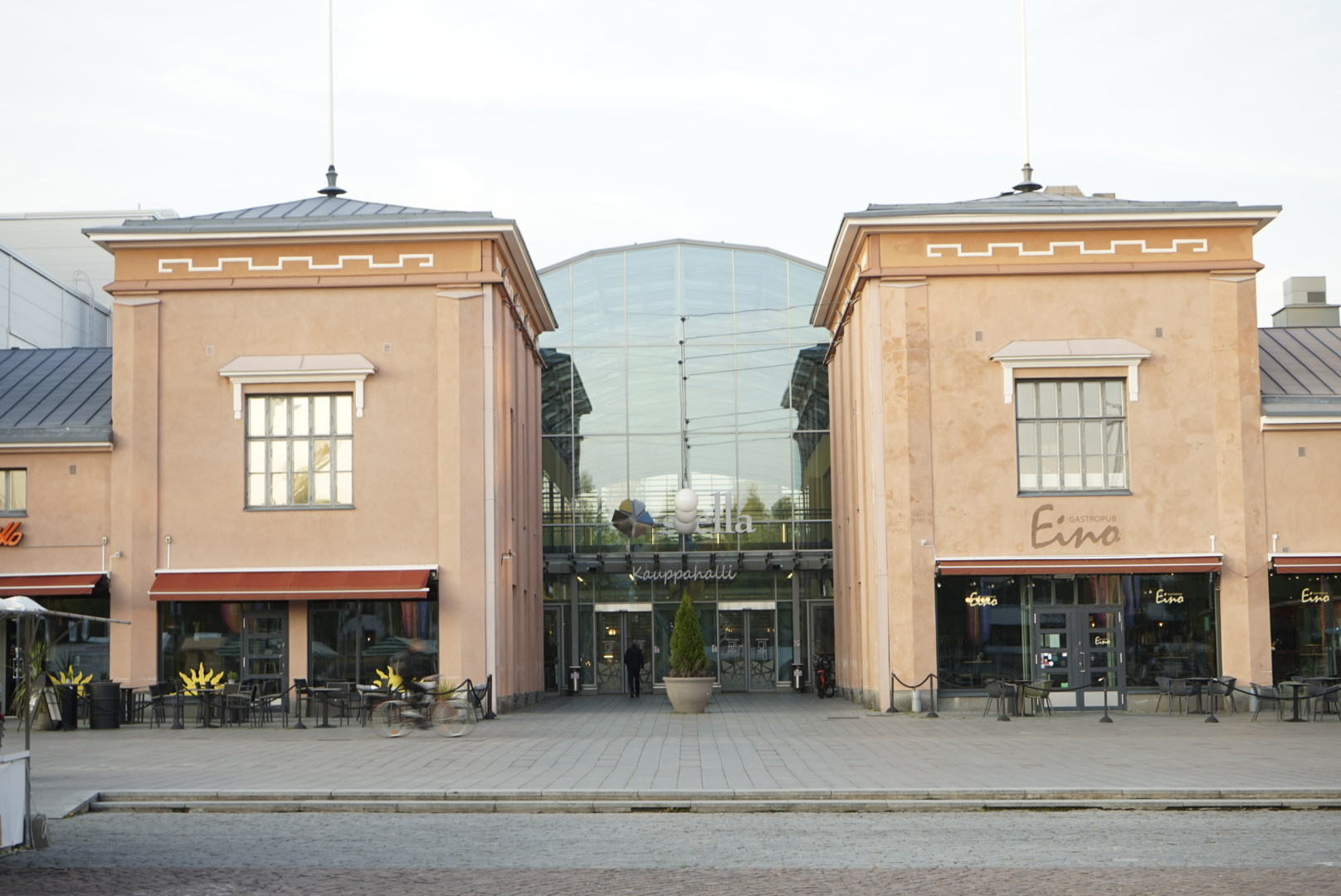
Entrance of the Stella shopping centre

In 2022, in addition to educational institutions, Mikkeli's largest employers are the Suur-Savo Cooperative, Rejlers and Savonlinja, and among the companies with the largest turnover are also the subsidiaries of Suur-Savon Sähkö, Järvi-Suomen Energia and Lumme Energia. Mikkeli's development company Miksei Oy is responsible for the development of business and industry in Mikkeli.

The city also operates the Central Archives for Finnish Business Records' (ELKA).

== Demographics ==
Historical population
Year	Pop.	±%
1950	45,951	—
1960	49,122	+6.9%
1970	51,033	+3.9%
1980	52,505	+2.9%
1990	54,404	+3.6%
2000	55,222	+1.5%
2010	54,455	−1.4%
2020	52,583	−3.4%
Source: Doria, Statistics Finland

The city of Mikkeli has 51,551 inhabitants, making it the 18th most populous municipality in Finland. The Mikkeli region has a population of 67,641. The city's population density is 20.23 inhabitants per square kilometre (52.4/sq mi).

=== Languages ===
Population by
mother tongue (2024)
1. Finnish (93.6%)
2. Russian (1.40%)
3. Ukrainian (1.10%)
4. Arabic (0.40%)
5. Estonian (0.30%)
6. Persian (0.30%)
7. English (0.30%)
8. Other (2.60%)

Mikkeli is a monolingual Finnish-speaking municipality. As of 2024, the majority of the population, 47,934 persons (93%), spoke Finnish as their first language. In addition, the number of Swedish speakers was 83 persons (0.2%) of the population. Foreign languages were spoken by 6.9% of the population. As English and Swedish are compulsory school subjects, functional bilingualism or trilingualism acquired through language studies is not uncommon.

At least 30 different languages are spoken in Mikkeli. The most common foreign languages are Russian (1.4%), Ukrainian (1.1%), Arabic (0.4%) and Estonian (0.3%).

=== Immigration ===
Population by country of birth (2025)
Country of birth	Population	%
Finland	48,050	93.2
Soviet Union	804	1.6
Ukraine	376	0.7
Russia	232	0.5
Philippines	184	0.4
Estonia	134	0.3
Thailand	100	0.2
Sweden	97	0.2
Afghanistan	87	0.2
Iran	83	0.2
Other	1,101	2.1

As of 2024, there were 3,302 persons with a foreign background living in Mikkeli, or 6% of the population. (Note: Statistics Finland classifies a person as having a "foreign background" if both parents or the only known parent were born abroad.) The number of residents who were born abroad was 3,234, or 6% of the population. The number of persons with foreign citizenship living in Mikkeli was 2,356. Most foreign-born citizens came from the former Soviet Union, Russia, Estonia and Thailand.

The relative share of immigrants in Mikkeli's population is below to the national average. However, the city's new residents are increasingly of foreign origin. This will increase the proportion of foreign residents in the coming years.

=== Urban areas ===
In 2023, out of the total population of 51,919; 41,929 people lived in urban areas and 9,524 in sparsely populated areas, while the coordinates of 466 people were unknown. The urban population in the municipality was divided between six statistical urban areas as follows:

#	Urban area	Population
1	Mikkeli urban area	36,807
2	Ristiina church village	2,030
3	Otava	1,413
2	Anttolankylä	767
3	Haukivuori station area	678
3	Pellosniemi	234

=== Religion ===
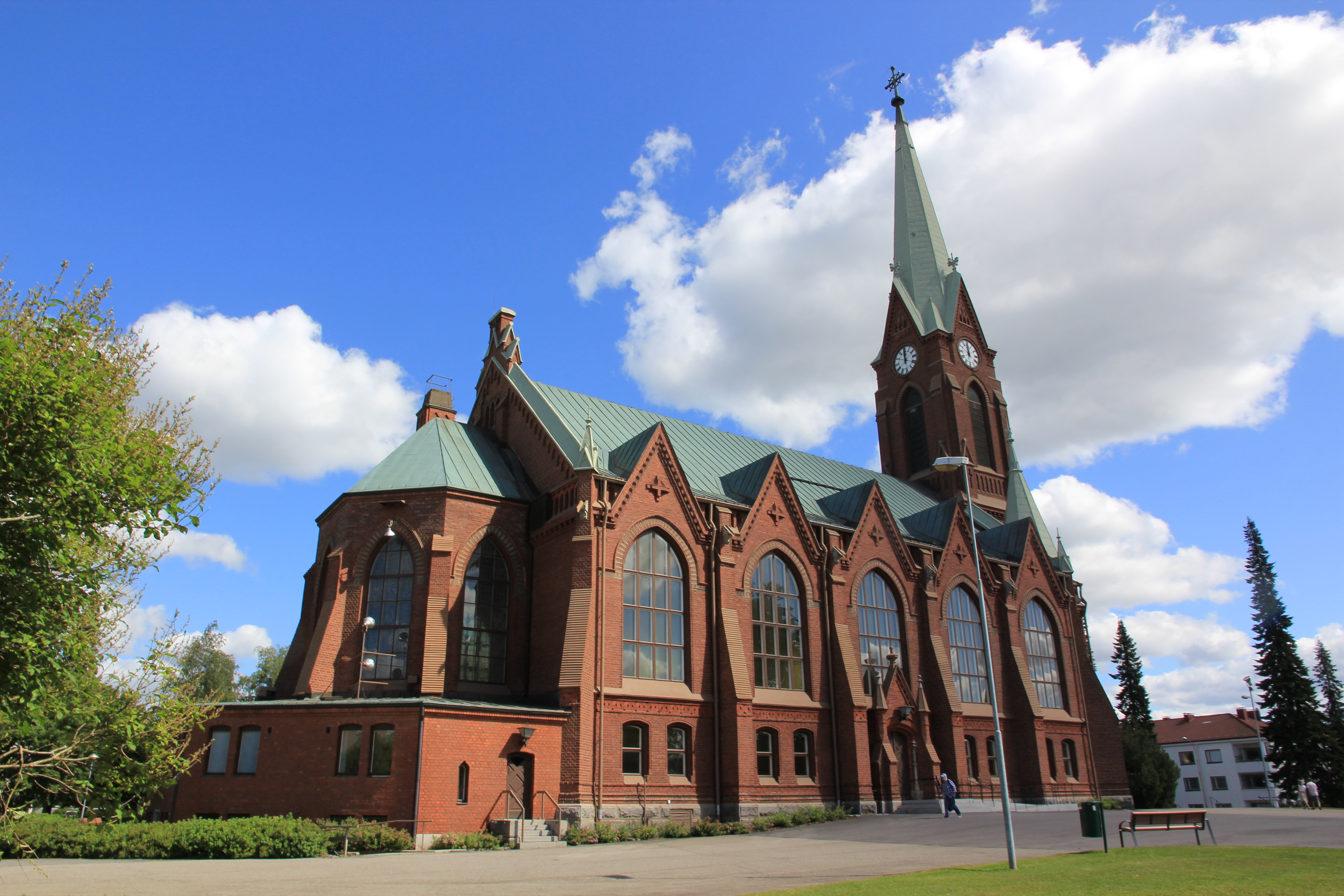
Mikkeli Cathedral

In 2023, the Evangelical Lutheran Church was the largest religious group with 71.4% of the population of Mikkeli. Other religious groups accounted for 1.9% of the population. 26.7% of the population had no religious affiliation.

== Education ==
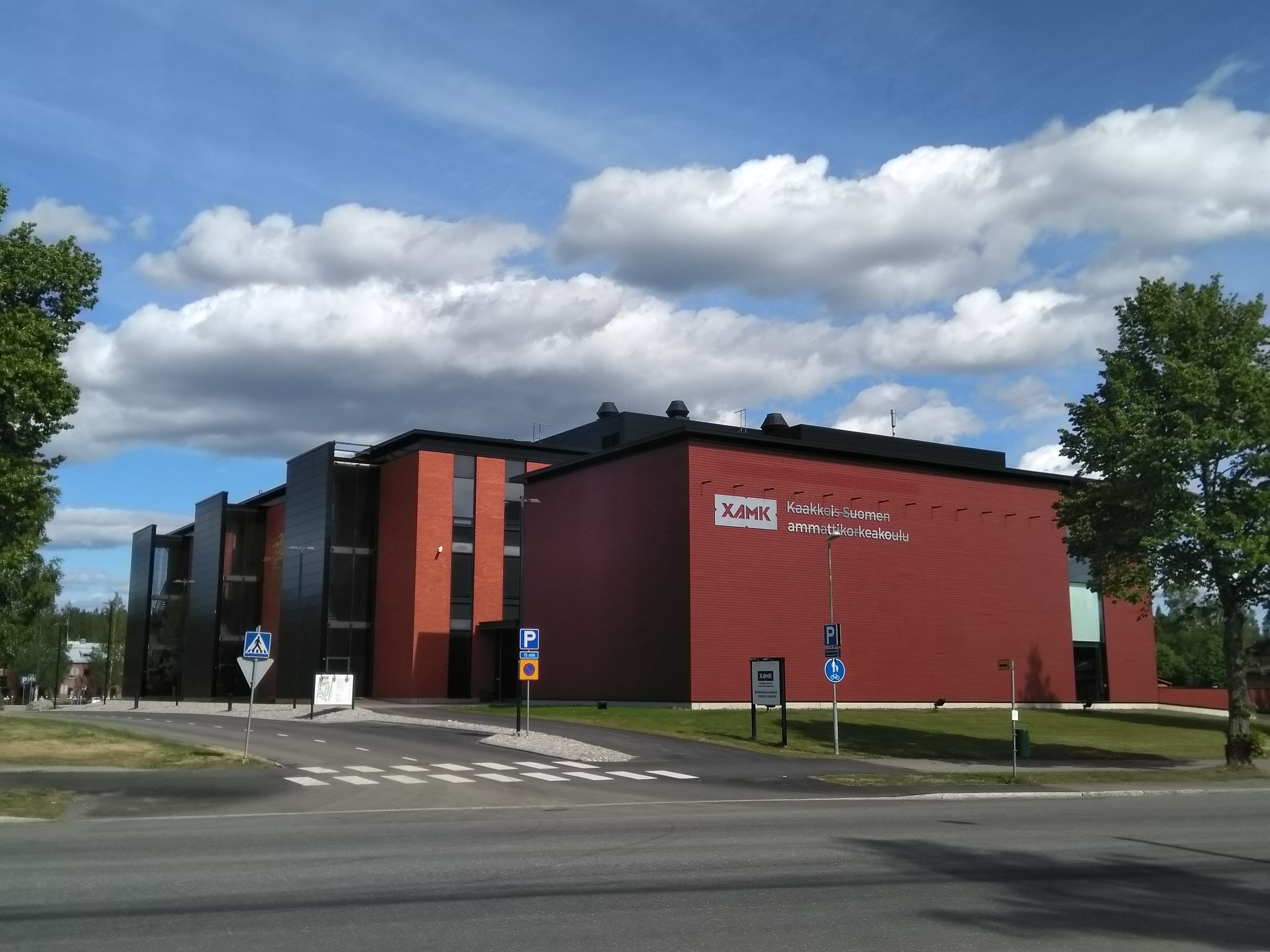
South-Eastern Finland University of Applied Sciences

A central campus of South-Eastern Finland University of Applied Sciences (Xamk) is located in Mikkeli and is a major employer in the city. Its history dates back to 1965, when Mikkeli was selected as the site for a new higher education college specializing in professional, engineering and vocational studies, enrolling its first class of students in 1969 while situated in an old Russian Army barracks on the outskirts of town. Purpose-built accommodations have since been added, but the old buildings are still in use, with the student union located in the "Officers' Club" building. The Polytechnic changed its name to Mikkeli University of Applied Sciences in 2006 and merged in the beginning of 2017 with Kymenlaakso University of Applied Sciences to constitute a new university: South-Eastern Finland University of Applied Sciences (Xamk).

Several other universities also have operations in Mikkeli. The Mikkeli University Consortium includes units from University of Helsinki, Aalto University (formerly Helsinki School of Economics), University of Eastern Finland and Lappeenranta University of Technology. Aalto offers a highly ranked Bachelor of Science degree in international business, taught in English, which draws students and faculty from around the world.

== Traffic ==
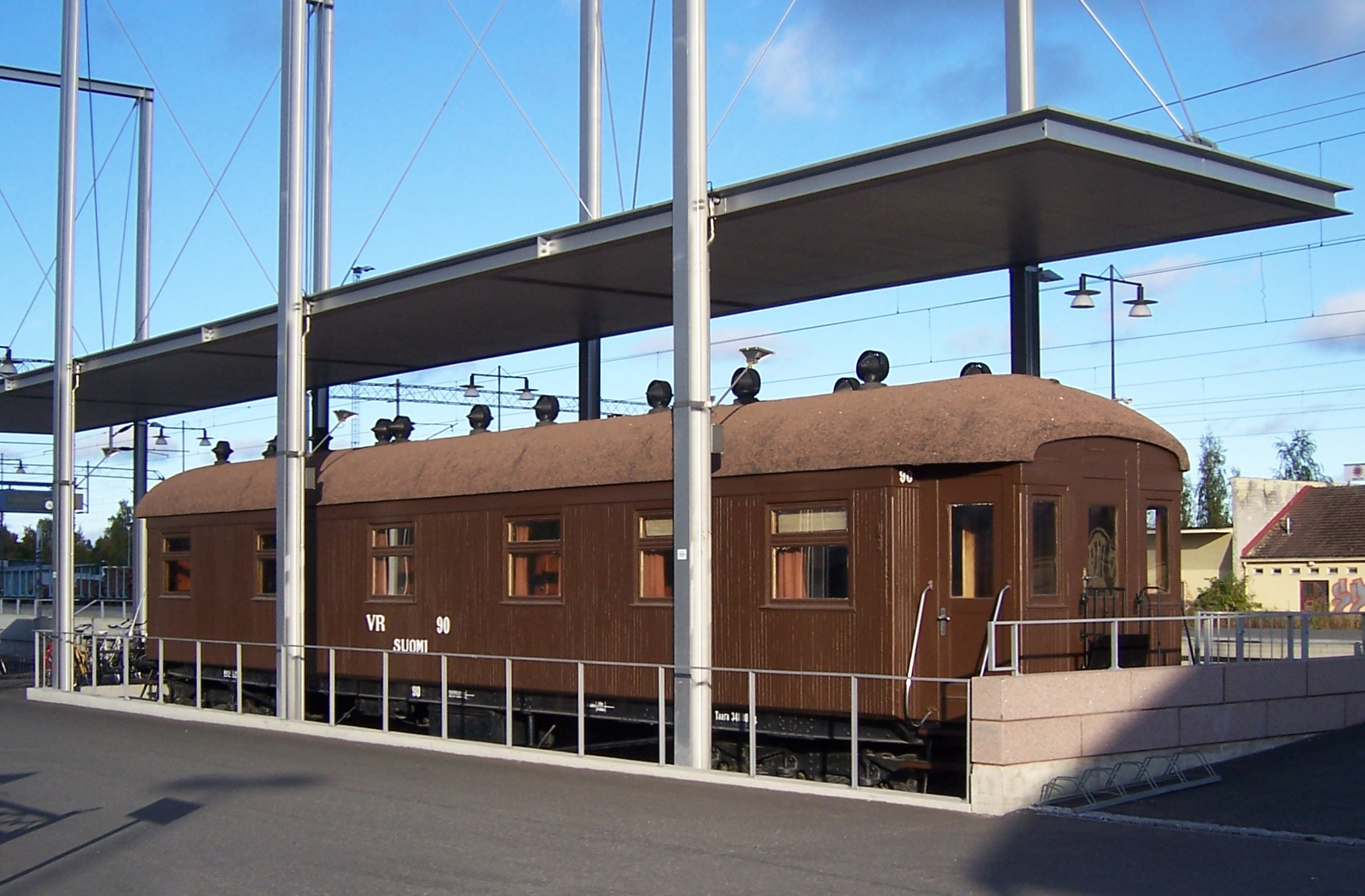
Mannerheim's carriage

Mikkeli has a fast road connection to the Helsinki metropolitan area through Finnish national road 5 and Finnish national road 4, which is a four lane highway. Mikkeli has a railway station on the Savo railway with five trains to and from Helsinki, daily. There are also bus connections to neighboring cities and municipalities and a small local bus transit network within the city limits. Mikkeli also has its own airport, which however has had no scheduled commercial flights since 2005.

== Culture ==
Mikkeli boasts its own concert hall, which is a world class facility built in 1988 to commemorate Mikkeli's 150th anniversary as a town. The concert hall is the home of St. Michel Strings chamber orchestra, and also provides the main venue for the annual Mikkeli Music Festival, which attracts musicians and audiences from across Europe. The Mariinsky Opera, led by Valery Gergiev, performs there regularly.

=== Food ===
In the 1980s, Mikkeli's traditional parish dishes were Midsummer rieska breads (made from barley groats soaked in buttermilk) and egg butter, a crock-potted vendace and a Savonian roast (sautéed in butter).

== Tourism ==
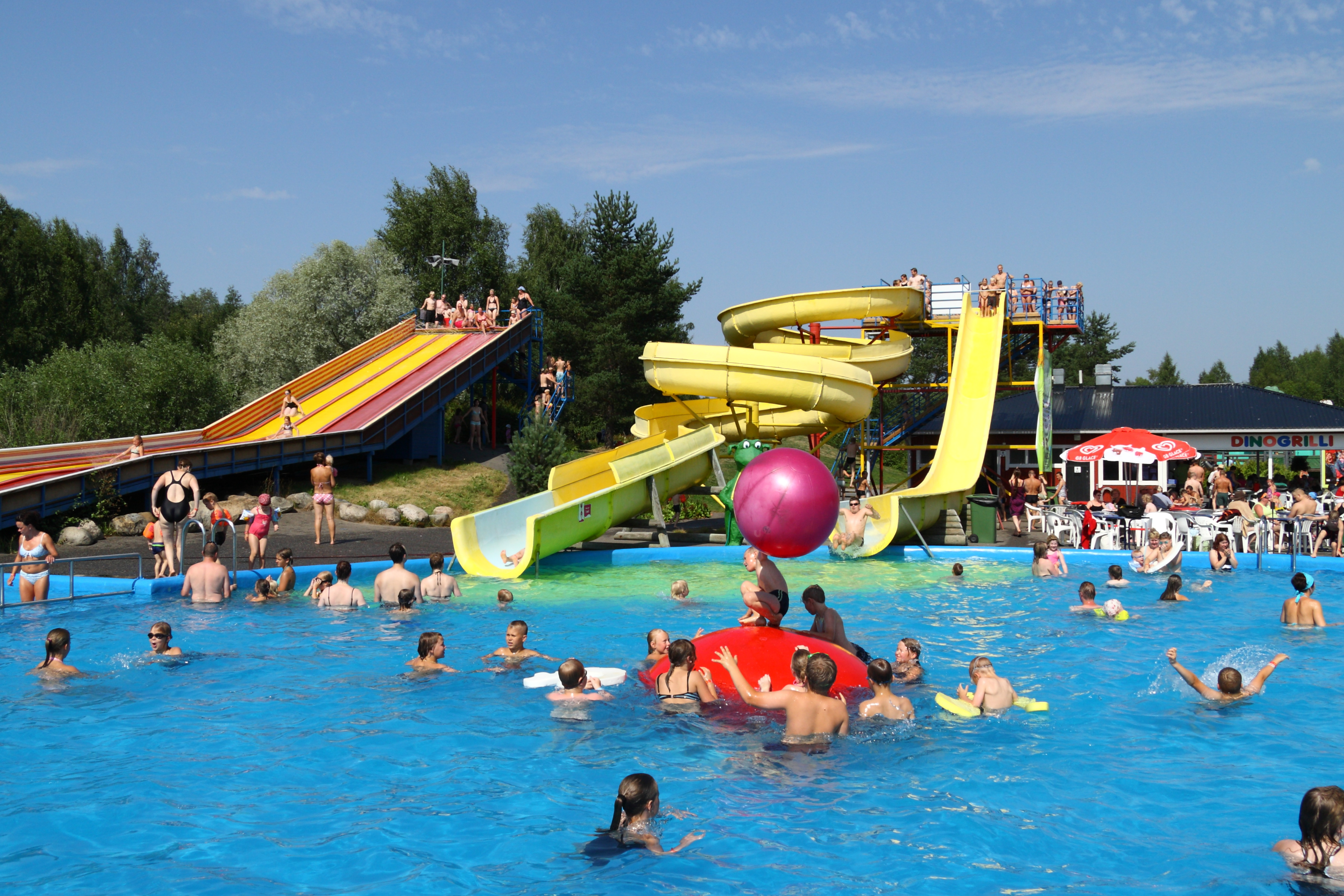
A swimming pools and water slides in Visulahti

Mikkeli is a major holiday resort within the Finnish lakeland area. A well-known and popular travel centre and theme park Visulahti is in Mikkeli, located in the shores of Lake Saimaa. Mikkeli is a popular area for summerhouses due to its vast amount of lakes; in 2020, there were over 10,000 summer houses in Mikkeli, the second most in Finland increasing the population during the summer months. A major part of tourism is based on nature and especially lakes.

Due to Mikkeli's role as the headquarter city in World War II, the town has several museums dedicated to that period of time. These museums include the Infantry museum, the Lokki Communications Center, and the Headquarters museum.

The annual trotting event St Michel ravit is Mikkeli's largest event with approximately 20 000 spectators.

Hotels are concentrated in the center of Mikkeli. In other areas, there are rental cottages scattered in the smaller villages and countryside.

== Sport ==
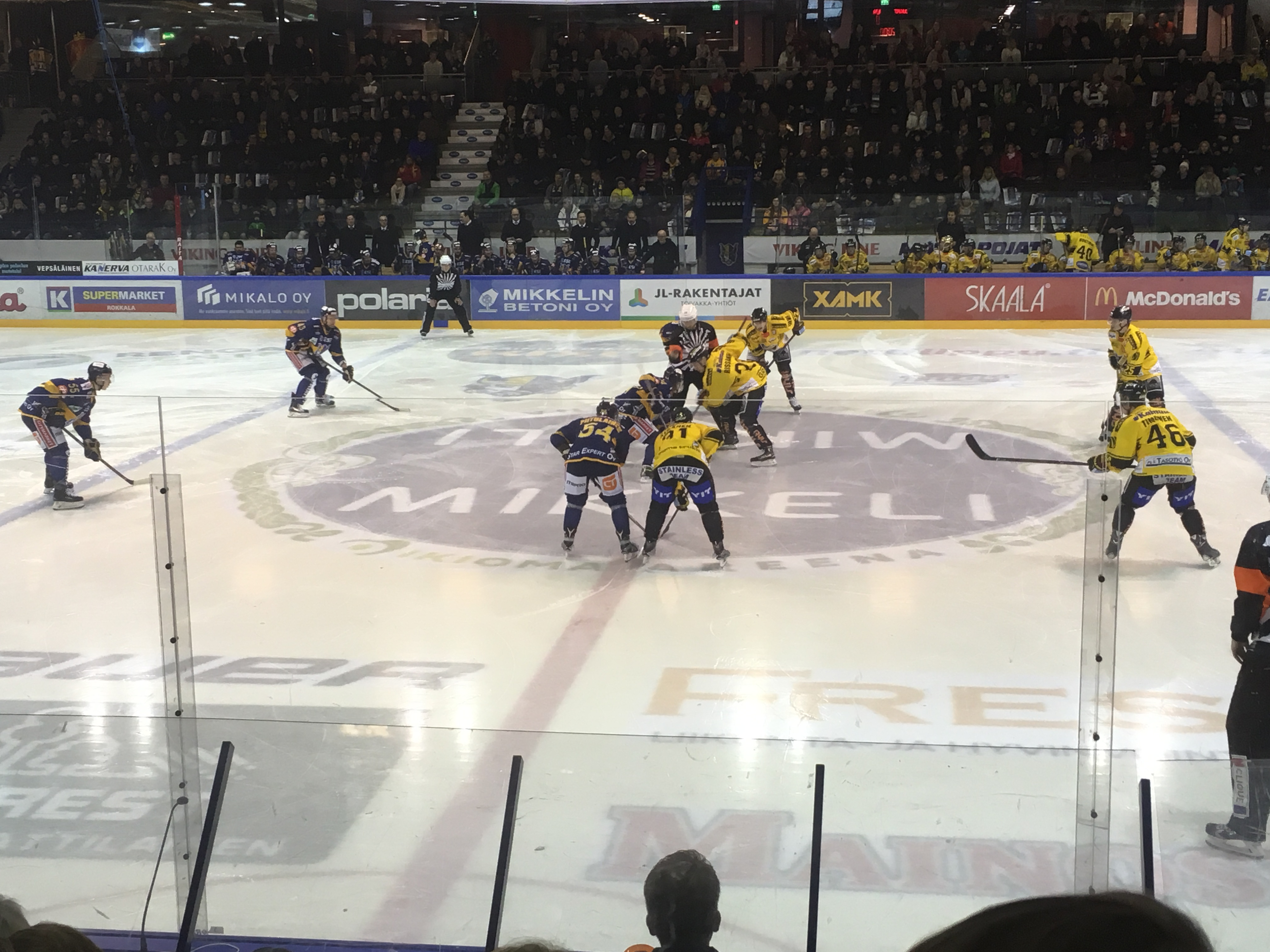
Jukurit ice hockey match at Ikioma Areena.

Jukurit is an ice hockey team from Mikkeli, which competes in the Finnish premier league, Liiga. The team has won six Mestis (second highest league) championships (2001, 2002, 2003, 2006, 2013 and 2015).

Mikkelin Kampparit plays in the highest bandy division. In 2012, they became Finnish champions for the first time.

Mikkeli has two major football teams, Mikkelin Palloilijat (MP) and Mikkelin Pallo-Kissat (MiPK). Both of them have played in the Finnish premier league, currently MP is playing on the second highest level and MiPK on the third highest. The former EU commissioner Olli Rehn used to play for MP for 13 years (youth teams 1968–78, first team 1979–82).

== Government ==
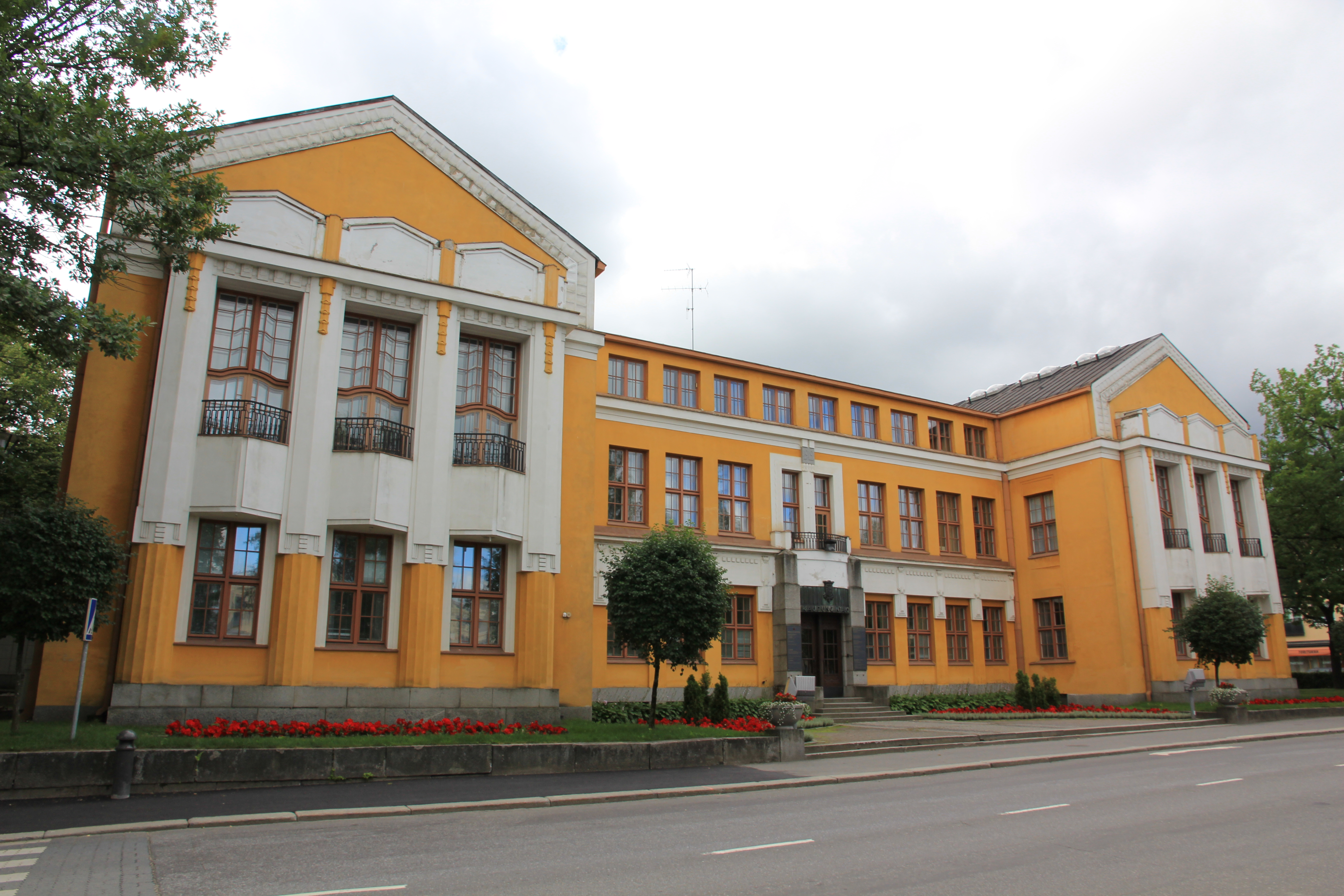
The Mikkeli City Hall

The Mikkeli City Council consists of 51 councillors. The current chairman of the council is Oskari Valtola (NCP). The City Board consists of 11 members and is chaired by Pekka Pöyry (Centre).

== Notable people ==
- Manuela Bosco (born 1982), actress and hurdler
- Jussi Jääskeläinen (born 1975), professional footballer and football coach
- Jari Ketomaa (born 1979), rally driver
- Harri Kirvesniemi (1958), cross-country skier
- Mikko Kolehmainen (born 1964), canoe sprinter
- Olli Kolehmainen (born 1967), canoe sprinter
- Shefki Kuqi (born 1976), Kosovan-born professional footballer and football manager
- Erkki Liikanen (born 1950), politician
- Otto Manninen (1872–1950) writer, poet and translator
- Mikko Tarmia (born 1978), video game music composer
- Arja Saijonmaa (born 1944), singer, actress and political activist
- Olli Rehn (born 1962), politician

== International relations ==
=== Twin towns and sister cities ===
Mikkeli is twinned with:

Békéscsaba, Hungary; Luga, Russia; Mõisaküla, Estonia	Vejle, Denmark; Molde, Norway; Borås, Sweden

== See also ==
- Anjan Puisto – an arboretum near Mikkeli
