= Ristiina =

- Former municipality
- Ristiinan kunta Kristina kommun
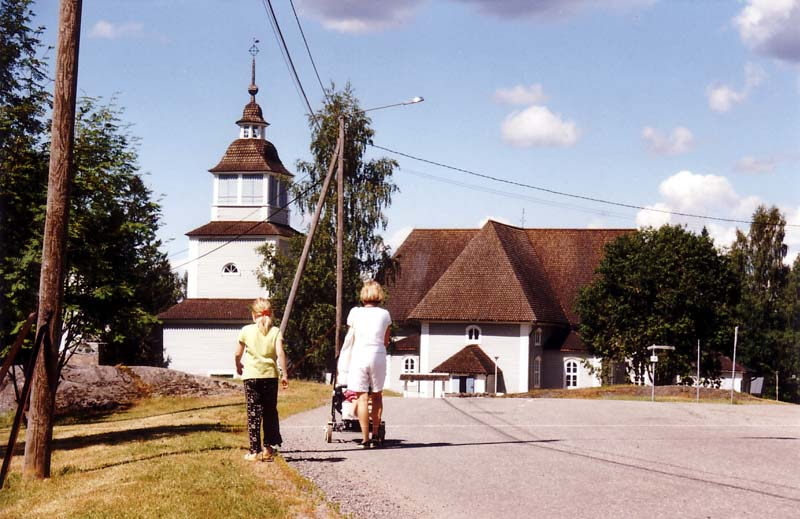
- Ristiina Church

- Coat of arms

- Location of Ristiina in Finland
- Coordinates: 61°30.5′N 027°15.5′E
- Country: Finland
- Region: South Savo
- Sub-region: Mikkeli sub-region
- Charter: 1649
- Part of Mikkeli city: 2013-01-01

Government
  - Municipal manager: Virpi Siekkinen

Area
  - Total: 742.02 km^{2} (286.50 sq mi)
  - Land: 566.15 km^{2} (218.59 sq mi)
  - Water: 175.87 km^{2} (67.90 sq mi)

Population (31 December 2012)
  - Total: 4,856
  - Density: 8.577/km^{2} (22.21/sq mi)
- Time zone: UTC+2 (EET)
  - Summer (DST): UTC+3 (EEST)
- Website: www.ristiina.fi

Ristiina (Finnish: [ˈristiːnɑ]; in Swedish also known as Kristina) was a municipality of Finland. It was founded in 1649 and it was named after Kristina Stenbock, the wife of Governor General and Count Per Brahe. From the beginning of the year 2013 Ristiina is a part of Mikkeli city.

Ristiina is located in the province of Eastern Finland and is part of the South Savo region. The municipality has a population of 4,856 (31 December 2012) and covers an area of 742.02 square kilometres (286.50 sq mi) of which 175.87 km^{2} (67.90 sq mi) is water. The population density is 8.5772/km^{2} (22.2149/sq mi).

The municipality is unilingually Finnish.

== History ==
The area of the later Ristiina municipality was originally a part of the Savilahti parish (the later Mikkelin maalaiskunta), the oldest parish in all of Savonia. By 1541, Savilahti had been divided into the administrative divisions of Pellosniemi and Visulahti. The Pellosniemi division, which included modern Ristiina, had its center in the village of Olkkolanniemi. A farm named Pellosniemi still exists in the village. The Ristiina parish was established in 1649. It was also known as Brahelinna after Per Brahe's manor in the area. Ristiina became the sole official name in 1901. The industrial area of Pellosniemi (not to be confused with old Pellosniemi in Olkkolanniemi) was formed in the 1960s in the southern part of the Rahikkala village. The name is derived from the Pellos factories (Pelloksen tehtaat).

Ristiina was consolidated with the town of Mikkeli in 2013.
