= Rejlers =

Engineering consultancy firm, Sweden

- Type: Private
- Industry: Engineering Consultancy
- Founded: 1942
- Headquarters: Stockholm, Sweden
- Key people: Viktor Svensson (CEO) Peter Rejler (Chairman of the Board)
- Number of employees: 3600
- Website: www.rejlers.com

Rejlers is one of the largest engineering consultancy firms in the Nordic region. Rejlers has 3600 employees in technology areas such as energy, industry, infrastructure, buildings, telecom and defence. Rejlers have representation in Sweden, Finland, Norway and the United Arab Emirates. In 2025, the company had a turnover of 4.7 billion SEK and its class B share is listed on Nasdaq Stockholm.

A merger between Rejlers and Norwegian engineering consultancy firm Multiconsult was announced in 2026. The new group will be called Multiconsult Rejlers.
