= Turku University of Applied Sciences =

Institute of higher education in Southwest Finland

Coordinates: 60°26′57″N 22°17′45″E

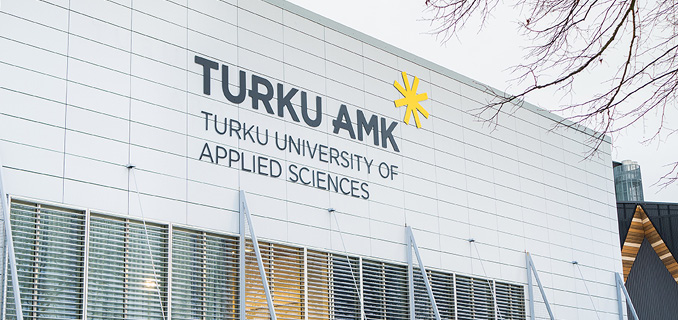
- Type: Public
- Established: 1992
- Rector: Vesa Taatila
- Administrative staff: 700
- Students: 9,600
- Location: Turku, Salo, Finland
- Website: tuas.fi

Turku University of Applied Sciences (abbr. TUAS, Finnish Turun ammattikorkeakoulu / Turku AMK) is a multidisciplinary higher education institution in the city of Turku and Salo in Southwest Finland. The institute began operations as a temporary polytechnic in autumn 1992. Before 2006, the institution carried the English name of Turku Polytechnic.

At the moment, the establishment has approximately 9,600 students and 700 members of staff, making it one of the largest universities of applied sciences in Finland.

In Finland Universities of Applied Sciences (UAS) have the mission to train professionals with emphasis on labour market needs and conduct research and development which supports instruction and promotes regional development in particular. The education in UAS emphasises co-operation with the business, industry and service sectors at the regional level in particular.

TUAS offers education in four fields of study and altogether in over 70 degree programmes, both Bachelor and Master studies. Most of the degree programmes are conducted only in Finnish. TUAS also provides training and consulting services for individuals and organisations in the public and private sector and coordinates or acts as a partner in over 200 RDI projects yearly.

== Campuses ==
Turku University of Applied Sciences has campuses in the following towns:

- Turku
- Salo
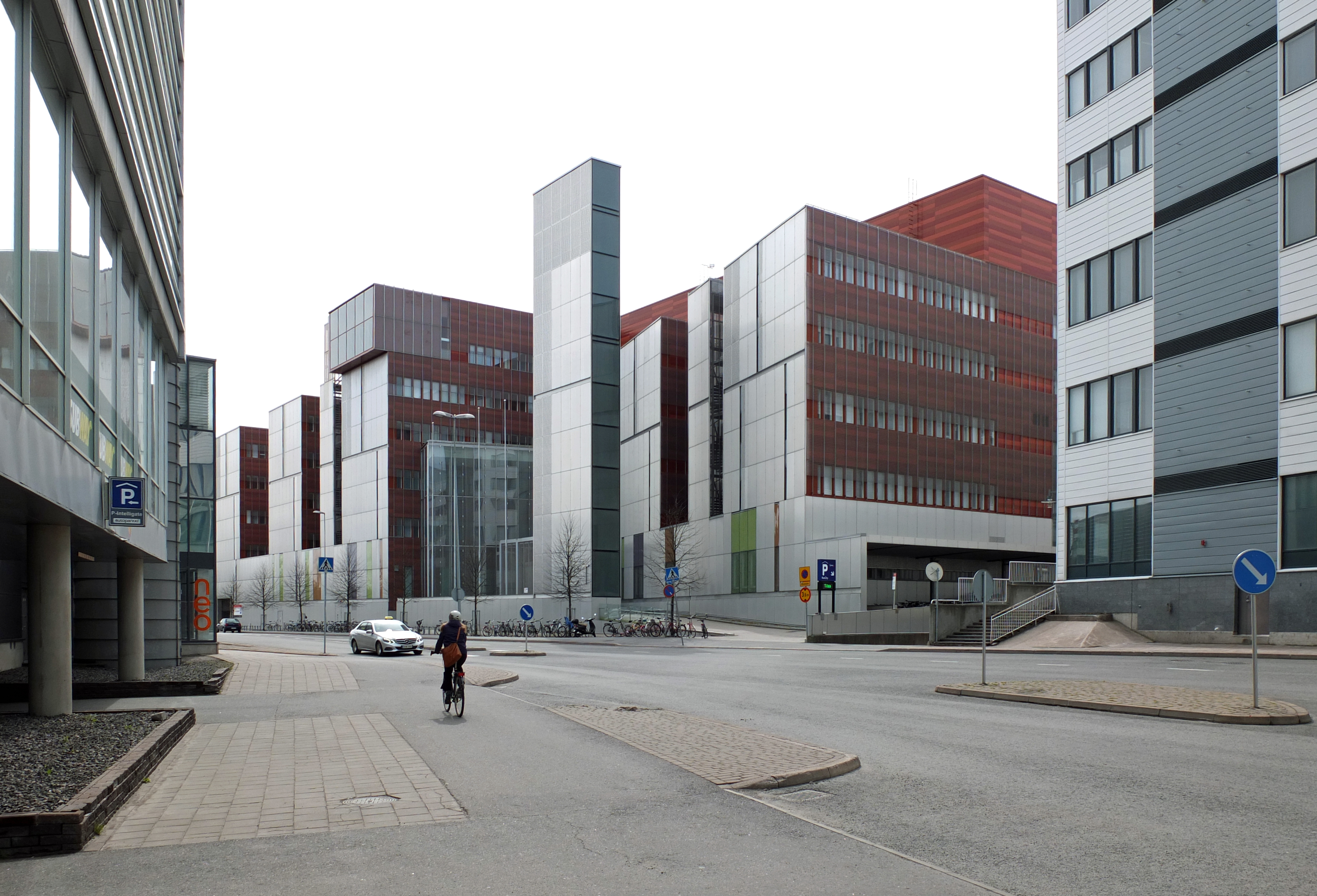
ICT-city is part of TUAS's Kupittaa Campus in Turku.

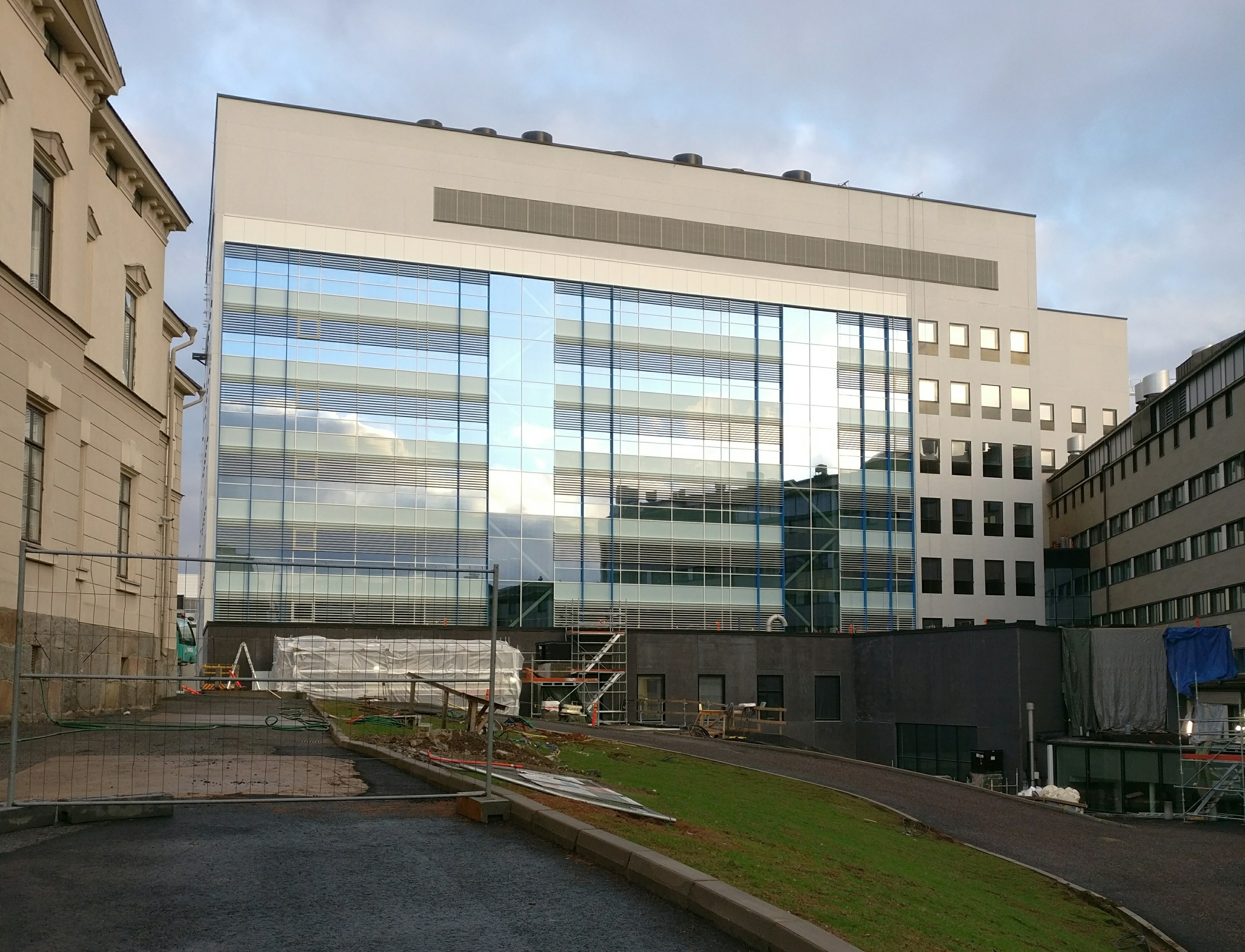
TUAS operates in the Medisiina D building, which is a modern working and learning environment in the Kupittaa district in Turku.

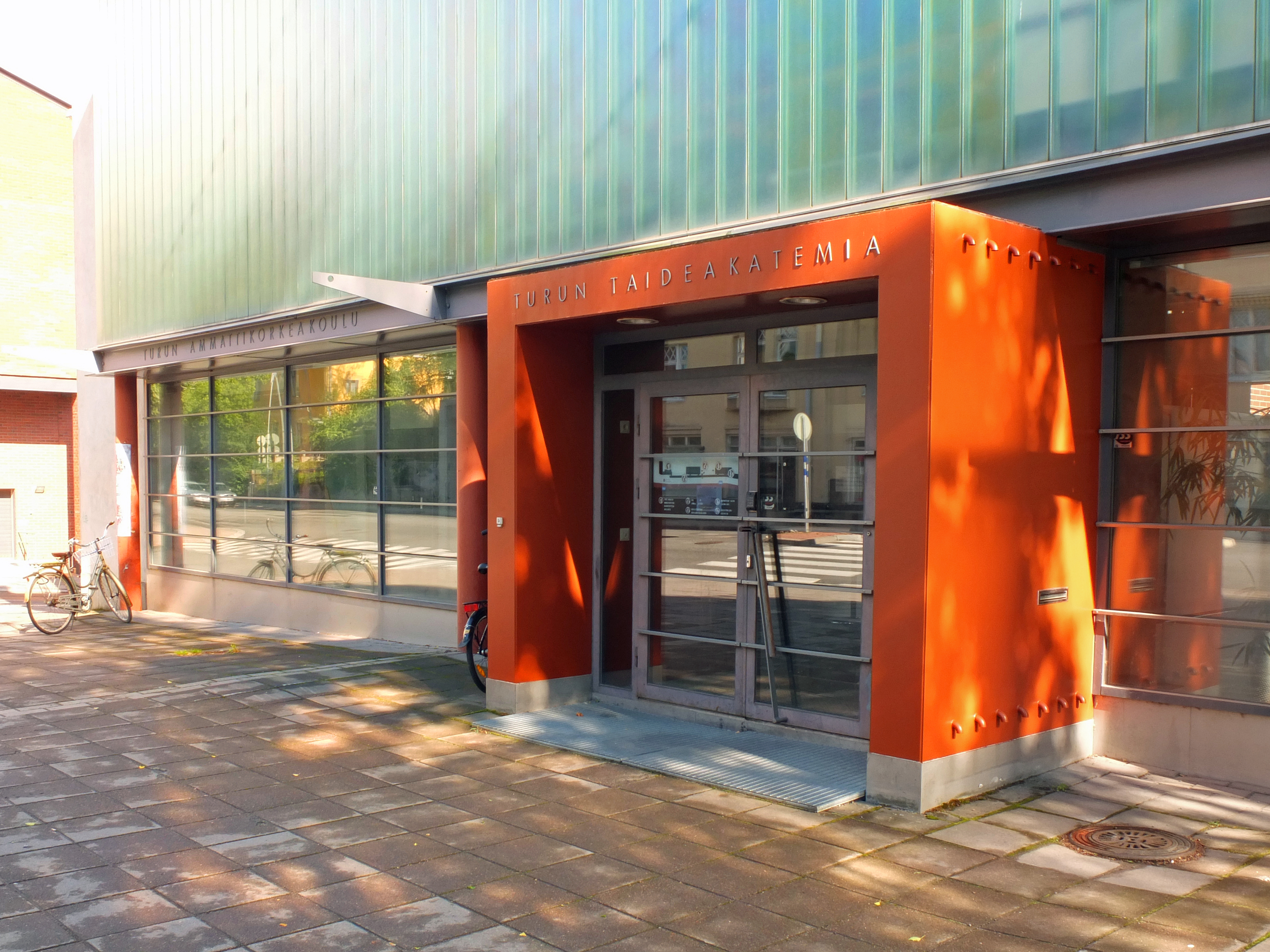
TUAS Arts Academy Linnankatu campus is located in the Turku Riverside.

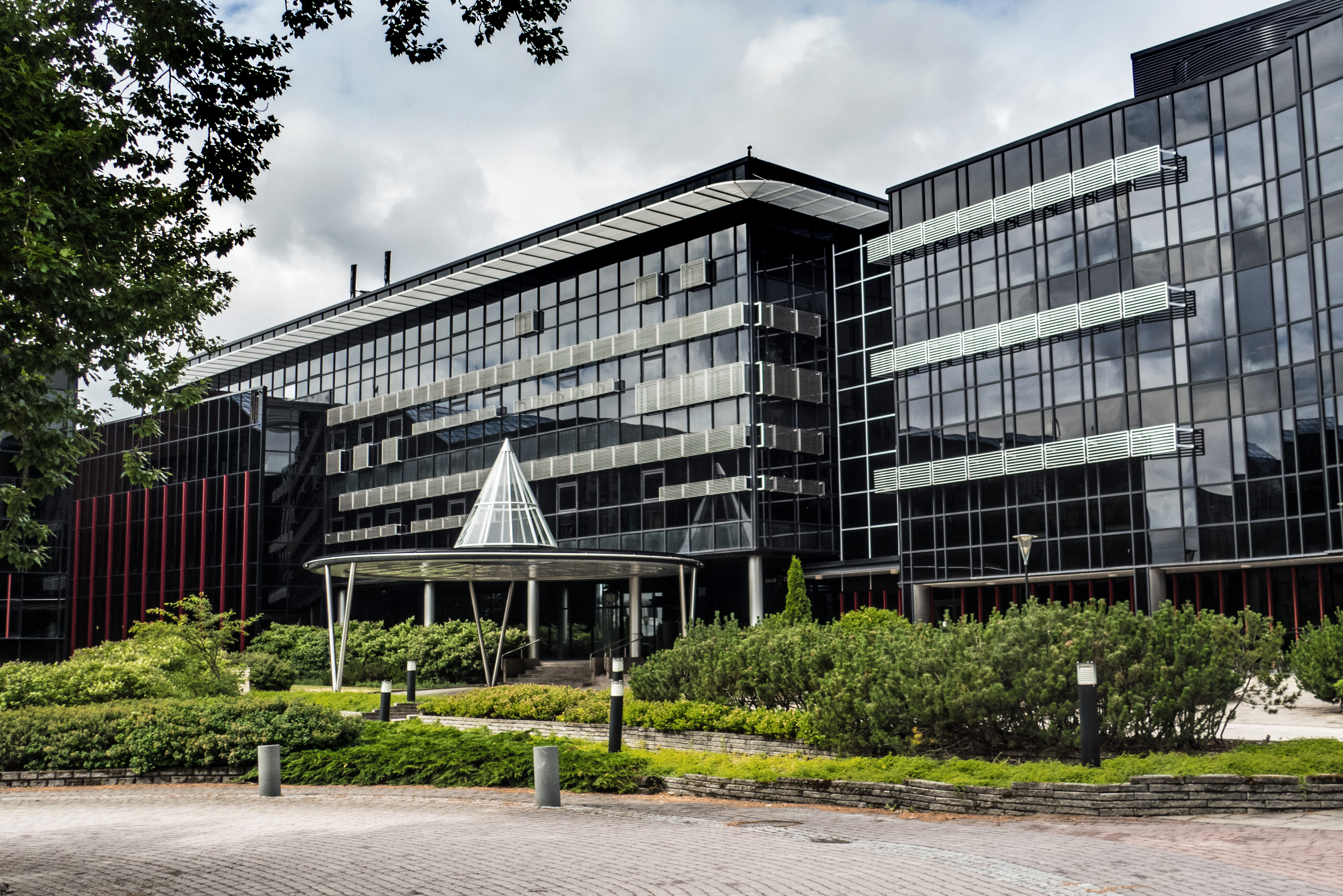
TUAS Salo is located at the Salo IoT Campus, a community of companies, scientists and educational institutions.

== Fields of education ==
Turku University of Applied Sciences offers education in the following faculties:

- Arts Academy: producing performances, exhibitions and other events. Approximately 800 students.
- Faculty of Health and Well-being: educates professionals to work in the field of health care and social services. Approximately 5,800 students.
- Faculty of Engineering and Business: educating engineers and Bachelors of Business Administration. Approximately 3,000 students.

== Degree programmes conducted in English ==
=== Bachelor's degrees ===
==== Business ====
- Bachelor of Business Administration, International Business Online

==== Technology ====
- Bachelor of Engineering, Biotechnology
- Bachelor of Engineering, Energy and Environmental Engineering
- Bachelor of Engineering, Information and Communications Technology
- Bachelor of Engineering, Mechanical Engineering

==== Healthcare ====
- Bachelor of Social Services, Early Childhood Education

=== Master's degrees ===
==== Business ====
- Master of Business Administration, Business Management
- Master of Business Administration, Sales Management
- Master of Business Administration, Service Design

==== Arts ====
- Master of Culture and Arts, Creative Design Management, online
