= Russians in Finland =

Ethnic group

Русские в Финляндии / Финские русские Venäläiset Suomessa / Suomen venäläiset Ryssar i Finland / Finlandsryssar

Total population
- 33,848 Russian citizens; 102,618 Russian speakers (2025)

Regions with significant populations
- Helsinki, Turku and Tampere regions & South Karelia and North Karelia

Languages
- Finnish, Russian, Swedish

Religion
- predominantly Finnish Orthodox Church, Russian Orthodox Church, Atheism

Related ethnic groups
- Russian people, Jews in Finland

Russians in Finland or Finnish Russians are a linguistic and ethnic immigrant minority in Finland. As of 2025, there were 102,618 Russian speakers in Finland, or 1.8% of the population. It is the second largest linguistic minority in the country. However, many of the Russian-speaking immigrants are ethnically Ingrian Finns and other Finno-Ugric peoples. In addition, a significant minority of Estonians, Ukrainians and people from the former Soviet Union speak Russian as their mother tongue.

As of 2025, there were 33,848 people, or 0.6% of population, who hold Russian citizenship residing in Finland – dual citizens included. The dissolution of the Soviet Union has influenced how Statistics Finland defines a person's country of birth in their statistical data. Before 1991, individuals born in what is now Russia, Latvia, Belarus, Ukraine, or in other Post-Soviet states, are considered to have been born in the Soviet Union. 23,530 people were born in Russia and whereas 84,504 people come from the former Soviet Union.

Furthermore, there are people with Russian-background who have received only Finnish citizenship, and Estonian Russians. Two common reasons for immigration were marriage, and descendant from Ingrian Finns.

Russian citizens who moved before the Second World War are called "Old Russians". The next immigration wave happened after the dissolution of the Soviet Union, as Ingrian Finns re-migrated to Finland. At present, marriage and family ties are two other common reasons for Russians to immigrate to Finland.

== History ==
Historical population
Year	Pop.	±% p.a.
1890	5,795	—
1900	5,939	+0.25%
1910	7,339	+2.14%
1922	15,161	+6.23%
1990	3,884	−1.98%
1995	15,872	+32.52%
2000	28,205	+12.19%
2005	39,653	+7.05%
2010	54,559	+6.59%
2015	72,436	+5.83%
2020	84,190	+3.05%
2025	102,618	+4.04%
Russian speakers. Source: 1890-1922, 1990- Statistics Finland

The first migratory wave of Russians began in the early 18th century, when Finland was part of the Swedish Empire. About 40,000 Russian soldiers, civilian workers, and about 600 businessmen moved to the Grand Duchy of Finland, which became an autonomous state in personal union with the Russian Empire in 1809. When Finland became fully independent in 1917, many soldiers returned to Russia. Many businessmen stayed, including the Sinebrychoff family. During the Russian Revolution, many aristocrats and officers fled to Finland as refugees. The biggest refugee wave was in 1922 when about 33,500 people came to Finland. Many of them had Nansen passports for many years. During the Kronstadt rebellion about 1,600 officers fled to Finland. Russian citizens who moved in these three waves are called "Old Russians", whose 3,000–5,000 descendants live in Finland today. During World War II, there were about 69,700 Soviet prisoners of war in Finland, and 200–300 children were born to them and Finnish women.

A second major wave of immigration occurred after the fall of the Soviet Union. Many Russian guest workers came to Finland, working low-paying jobs. In the 1990s, immigration to Finland grew, and a Russian-speaking population descended from Ingrian Finns immigrated to Finland. In the 2000s, many nouveaux riche Russians have bought estates in Eastern Finland.

== Population by municipalities ==
People born in Russia and living in Finland, according to Statistics Finland.

Country of birth Russia by municipality (2024)
Municipality	Population
Whole country	23,320
Helsinki	4,621
Espoo	2,907
Vantaa	1,951
Joensuu	1,078
Tampere	1,073
Lappeenranta	761
Turku	666
Lahti	659
Kuopio	616
Jyväskylä	515
Oulu	429
Kotka	418
Kajaani	311
Imatra	308
Pori	271
Kouvola	254
Mikkeli	238
Kitee	184
Porvoo	174
Rovaniemi	174
Vaasa	171
Kerava	159
Kirkkonummi	153
Savonlinna	146
Varkaus	146
Hamina	144
Salo	128
Hämeenlinna	123
Seinäjoki	123
Lieksa	106
Alajärvi	103
Järvenpää	103
Iisalmi	101
Raahe	97
Tuusula	96
Kokkola	95
Hyvinkää	87
Nurmijärvi	85
Lohja	81
Raisio	74
Outokumpu	62
Nurmes	61
Nokia	60
Riihimäki	59
Kalajoki	58
Lappajärvi	58
Tohmajärvi	57
Sipoo	56
Kemi	55
Kontiolahti	55
Liperi	54
Tornio	54
Rauma	52
Leppävirta	49
Kuusamo	48
Raseborg	47
Heinola	45
Kaarina	45
Pieksämäki	45
Jakobstad	45
Vihti	45
Kangasala	44
Siilinjärvi	41
Virrat	41
Forssa	39
Haapavesi	39
Mariehamn	39
Mäntsälä	37
Valkeakoski	37
Ylöjärvi	37
Loviisa	35
Sotkamo	35
Ilomantsi	34
Hollola	33
Kauhava	32
Jämsä	30
Salla	30
Kauhajoki	28
Kauniainen	28
Lempäälä	28
Ulvila	26
Inari	25
Karkkila	25
Loimaa	25
Pirkkala	25
Kemijärvi	24
Lapua	24
Akaa	22
Taipalsaari	22
Juuka	21
Kuhmo	21
Orimattila	21
Uusikaupunki	21
Keuruu	20
Oulainen	20
Rantasalmi	20
Siuntio	20
Virolahti	20
Ylivieska	20
Mäntyharju	19
Posio	19
Suonenjoki	19
Alavus	18
Lapinlahti	18
Korsholm	18
Lieto	17
Naantali	17
Närpes	17
Ruokolahti	17
Vimpeli	17
Hanko	16
Kangasniemi	16
Luumäki	16
Pyhtää	16
Sievi	16
Äänekoski	16
Kankaanpää	15
Kempele	15
Kurikka	15
Nivala	15
Suomussalmi	15
Kittilä	13
Laukaa	13
Miehikkälä	13
Pyhäntä	13
Haapajärvi	12
Harjavalta	12
Hattula	12
Huittinen	12
Ilmajoki	12
Paimio	12
Vörå	12
Keminmaa	11
Muurame	11
Parkano	11
Pyhäjoki	11
Rääkkylä	11
Vieremä	11
Jomala	10
Joroinen	10
Laitila	10

People with Russia citizenship living in Finland according to Statistics Finland.

Citizens of Russia by municipality (2024)
Municipality	Population
Whole country	35,172
Helsinki	6,833
Espoo	4,128
Vantaa	2,996
Lappeenranta	1,407
Joensuu	1,383
Tampere	1,262
Lahti	1,189
Turku	1,091
Kotka	936
Imatra	807
Kuopio	743
Jyväskylä	615
Kouvola	528
Kajaani	519
Oulu	512
Savonlinna	335
Hamina	317
Kerava	295
Salo	272
Mikkeli	265
Kitee	239
Pori	228
Porvoo	221
Kirkkonummi	219
Lieksa	213
Vaasa	193
Hämeenlinna	176
Rovaniemi	170
Alajärvi	164
Hyvinkää	163
Järvenpää	155
Raisio	151
Iisalmi	149
Lohja	149
Nurmijärvi	139
Raahe	138
Kokkola	133
Varkaus	130
Tuusula	117
Outokumpu	108
Heinola	101
Nurmes	98
Sotkamo	98
Nokia	97
Kalajoki	93
Raseborg	93
Kuhmo	92
Rauma	91
Sipoo	89
Vihti	86
Taipalsaari	85
Seinäjoki	83
Virolahti	82
Haapavesi	79
Kuusamo	79
Tohmajärvi	79
Lappajärvi	77
Ruokolahti	77
Kaarina	76
Pieksämäki	75
Loviisa	73
Riihimäki	70
Hollola	62
Luumäki	62
Virrat	61
Karkkila	60
Forssa	56
Kauhava	54
Leppävirta	53
Uusikaupunki	52
Keuruu	51
Tornio	51
Pyhtää	49
Liperi	47
Valkeakoski	47
Äänekoski	47
Kemi	46
Kontiolahti	46
Rantasalmi	45
Ylivieska	45
Orimattila	44
Siilinjärvi	44
Inari	43
Suomussalmi	42
Jämsä	41
Kauniainen	40
Jakobstad	40
Kemijärvi	37
Vimpeli	37
Ilomantsi	36
Kangasala	36
Kauhajoki	35
Hanko	34
Mäntsälä	34
Pyhäjoki	33
Salla	33
Loimaa	32
Pyhäntä	32
Lapinlahti	31
Siuntio	30
Ylöjärvi	30
Lapua	29
Laukaa	29
Vieremä	29
Alavus	28
Mäntyharju	27
Sastamala	27
Haapajärvi	26
Miehikkälä	26
Parikkala	26
Rautjärvi	26
Sievi	26
Juuka	25
Juva	25
Kiuruvesi	25
Korsholm	25
Akaa	24
Nivala	24
Oulainen	24
Rääkkylä	24
Sulkava	24
Ulvila	24
Kangasniemi	23
Heinävesi	22
Loppi	22
Huittinen	21
Suonenjoki	21
Mänttä-Vilppula	20
Posio	20
Puumala	20
Kokemäki	19
Laitila	19
Lempäälä	19
Kittilä	18
Evijärvi	16
Kempele	16
Lemi	16
Naantali	16
Savitaipale	16
Harjavalta	15
Mariehamn	15
Närpes	15
Pielavesi	15
Puolanka	15
Ruovesi	15
Siikajoki	15
Ii	14
Jokioinen	14
Keitele	14
Masku	14
Paimio	14
Pargas	14
Parkano	14
Pirkkala	14
Pudasjärvi	14
Tuusniemi	14
Eura	13
Joroinen	13
Kankaanpää	13
Kärkölä	13
Muurame	13
Enonkoski	12
Hämeenkyrö	12
Ilmajoki	12
Lapinjärvi	12
Siikalatva	12
Janakkala	11
Lieto	11
Pyhäjärvi	11
Taivalkoski	11
Ähtäri	11
Askola	10
Hankasalmi	10
Kristinestad	10
Larsmo	10
Rautalampi	10
Saarijärvi	10

People with Russian as mother tongue living in Finland according to Statistics Finland.

Russian speakers by municipality (2024)
Municipality	Population
Whole country	102,487
Helsinki	21,423
Espoo	11,144
Vantaa	10,754
Turku	3,902
Tampere	3,808
Lappeenranta	3,379
Lahti	3,359
Joensuu	2,692
Kotka	2,603
Jyväskylä	1,900
Kuopio	1,856
Imatra	1,588
Kouvola	1,580
Oulu	1,385
Kerava	1,106
Kirkkonummi	971
Salo	915
Hamina	892
Kajaani	883
Pori	817
Mikkeli	722
Porvoo	706
Savonlinna	696
Järvenpää	692
Tuusula	679
Vaasa	635
Nurmijärvi	629
Hyvinkää	572
Raisio	559
Hämeenlinna	513
Rovaniemi	475
Kitee	468
Lohja	467
Rauma	363
Sipoo	362
Riihimäki	357
Kokkola	354
Seinäjoki	348
Kaarina	347
Raahe	326
Vihti	312
Lieksa	293
Varkaus	289
Iisalmi	278
Nokia	265
Heinola	262
Hollola	251
Pieksämäki	228
Outokumpu	221
Raseborg	219
Alajärvi	217
Ylöjärvi	217
Loviisa	203
Sotkamo	194
Kangasala	190
Tohmajärvi	189
Forssa	187
Valkeakoski	184
Mäntsälä	181
Taipalsaari	178
Kemi	174
Kontiolahti	170
Jämsä	167
Kuhmo	165
Kuusamo	159
Liperi	158
Orimattila	154
Pirkkala	150
Pyhtää	150
Virolahti	149
Karkkila	147
Jakobstad	146
Ruokolahti	143
Äänekoski	141
Kauhava	139
Tornio	135
Uusikaupunki	134
Lapua	132
Sastamala	131
Lempäälä	129
Nurmes	129
Siilinjärvi	128
Naantali	126
Kalajoki	125
Luumäki	118
Lieto	117
Keuruu	113
Kauniainen	110
Siuntio	110
Leppävirta	108
Suomussalmi	106
Lappajärvi	105
Loimaa	101
Haapavesi	100
Laukaa	98
Ilomantsi	97
Kemijärvi	95
Huittinen	92
Mariehamn	92
Lapinlahti	91
Hanko	89
Virrat	89
Ylivieska	86
Somero	85
Ulvila	84
Akaa	83
Kankaanpää	80
Laitila	80
Korsholm	80
Närpes	75
Inari	73
Muurame	73
Paimio	71
Miehikkälä	68
Parikkala	68
Kempele	66
Juva	65
Nivala	65
Kangasniemi	64
Mäntyharju	64
Janakkala	63
Mänttä-Vilppula	63
Harjavalta	59
Pargas	58
Juuka	57
Rantasalmi	57
Suonenjoki	56
Kauhajoki	55
Kittilä	54
Pyhäntä	53
Sievi	52
Haapajärvi	51
Hausjärvi	50
Kokemäki	50
Masku	50
Salla	50
Eura	48
Oulainen	48
Rääkkylä	48
Alavus	47
Askola	47
Loppi	47
Pyhäjoki	46
Kurikka	45
Pöytyä	45
Rautjärvi	45
Kärkölä	44
Saarijärvi	44
Vimpeli	44
Pornainen	43
Nykarleby	43
Vieremä	43
Lemi	42
Pielavesi	41
Asikkala	40
Ikaalinen	40
Mynämäki	40
Joroinen	38
Vörå	37
Ingå	36
Evijärvi	35
Kiuruvesi	35
Puumala	35
Sulkava	35
Hattula	33
Jokioinen	33
Kronoby	33
Säkylä	33
Taivalkoski	33
Enonkoski	31
Ii	31
Orivesi	31
Parkano	31
Rusko	31
Iitti	30
Ilmajoki	30
Lapinjärvi	30
Pyhäjärvi	30
Eurajoki	29
Joutsa	29
Ähtäri	29
Pudasjärvi	28
Hämeenkyrö	26
Pälkäne	26
Rautalampi	26
Savitaipale	26
Heinävesi	25
Jomala	25
Kristinestad	25
Muhos	25
Polvijärvi	23
Ruovesi	23
Sauvo	23
Siikajoki	23
Korsnäs	22
Posio	22
Puolanka	21
Sodankylä	20
Tammela	20
Kannus	19
Laihia	19
Teuva	19
Tuusniemi	19
Urjala	19
Viitasaari	19
Hankasalmi	18
Keitele	18
Malax	18
Siikalatva	18
Hartola	17
Keminmaa	17
Larsmo	17
Karstula	16
Nakkila	16
Nousiainen	16
Sysmä	16
Toivakka	16
Ylitornio	16
Kaustinen	15
Liminka	15
Paltamo	15
Pedersöre	15
Pello	15
Veteli	15
Humppila	14
Hyrynsalmi	14
Isokyrö	14
Karvia	14
Kaskinen	14
Kimitoön	14
Padasjoki	14
Petäjävesi	14
Taivassalo	14
Kaavi	13
Koski Tl	13
Tervola	13
Aura	12
Kolari	12
Pukkila	12
Vesilahti	12
Kuhmoinen	11
Merikarvia	11
Multia	11
Oripää	11
Rautavaara	11
Utsjoki	11
Kustavi	10
Pihtipudas	10
Ranua	10
Vaala	10
Vesanto	10

== Culture ==
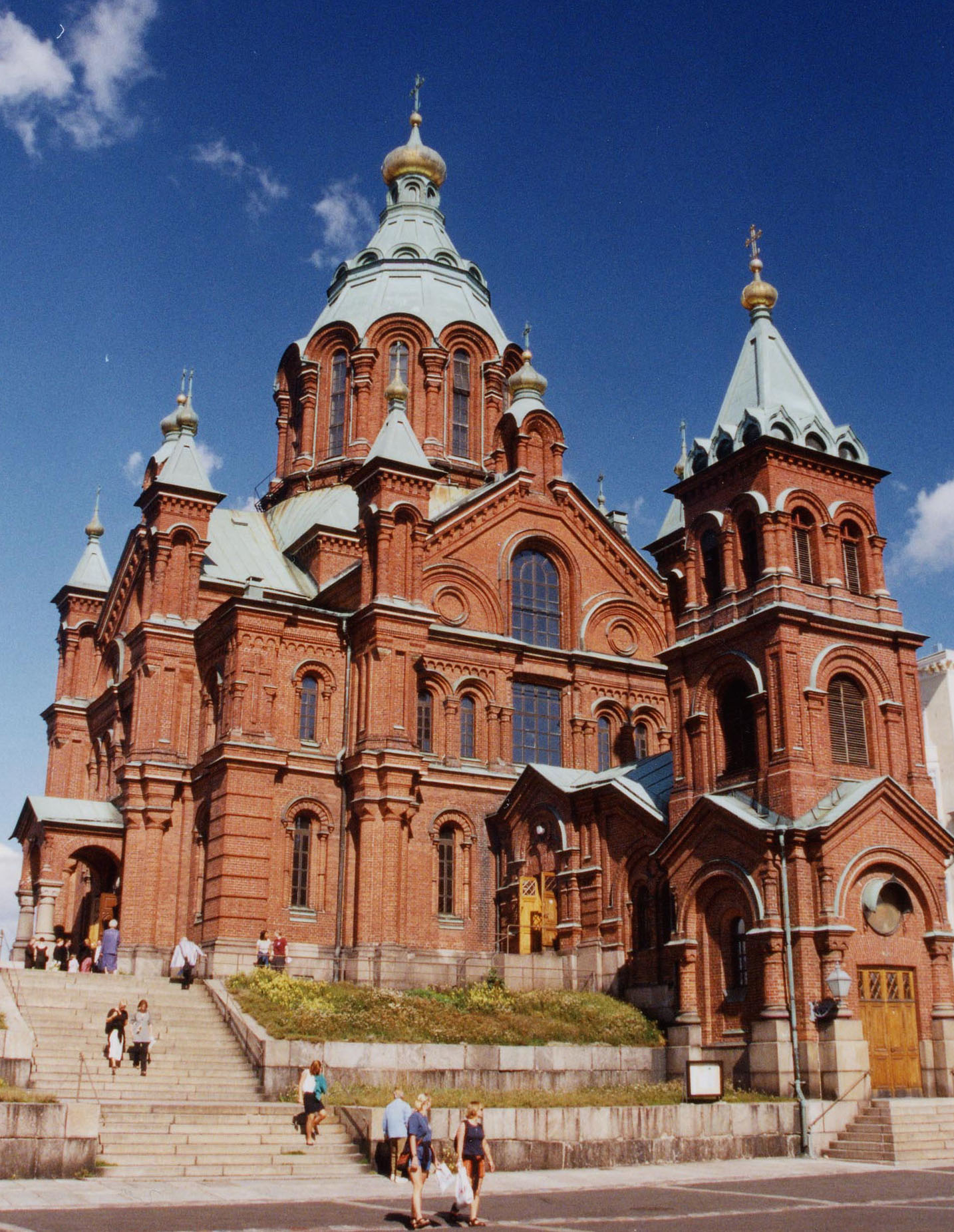
Uspenski Cathedral is a large 19th-century church built with donations from Finnish Russians, the largest Orthodox church in Western Europe. It was originally a Russian Orthodox church, but nowadays it belongs to the Finnish Orthodox Church.

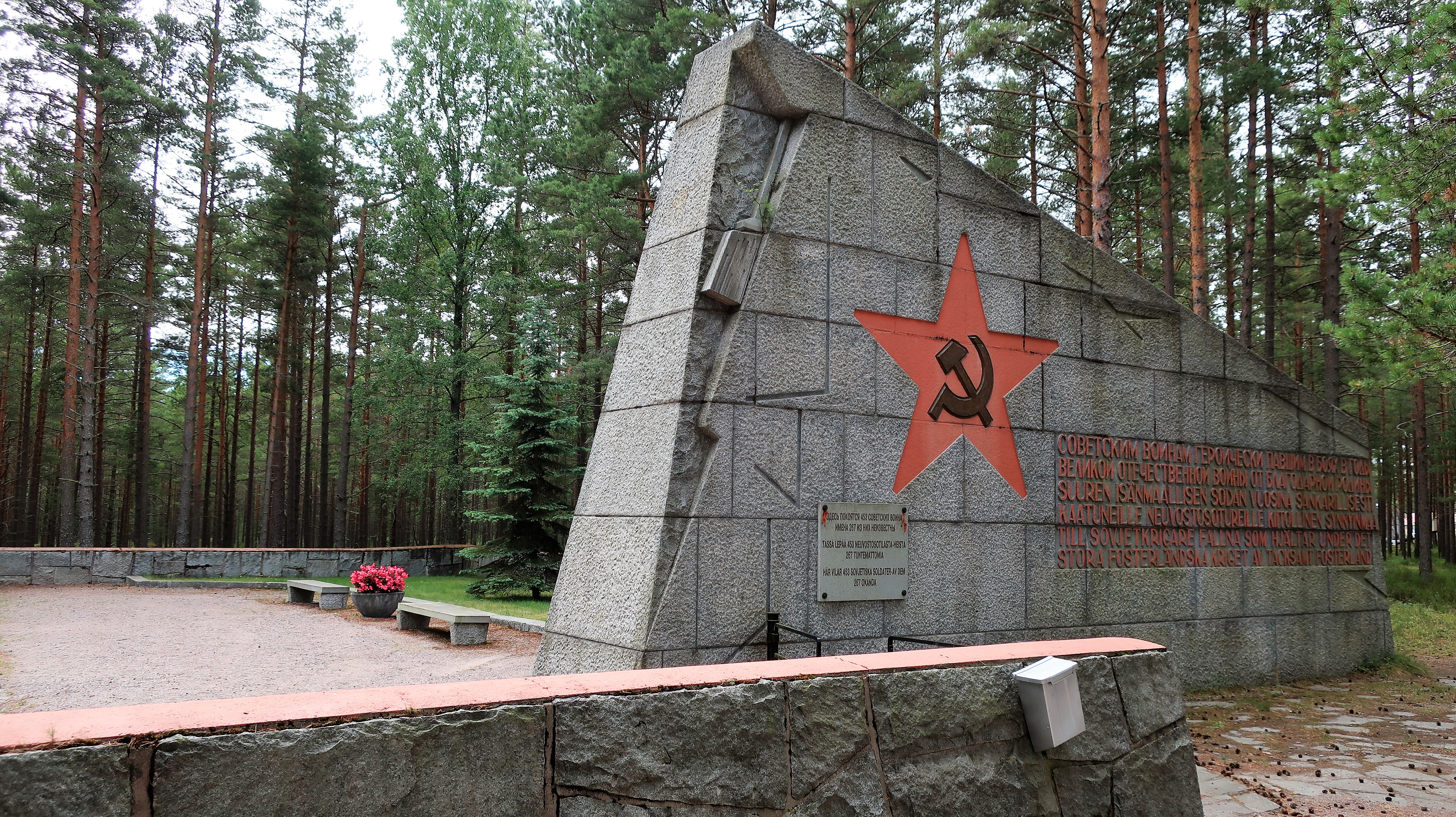
The Soviet monument in Hanko is a memorial to Soviet soldiers who fell in connection with Hanko battles during Continuation War

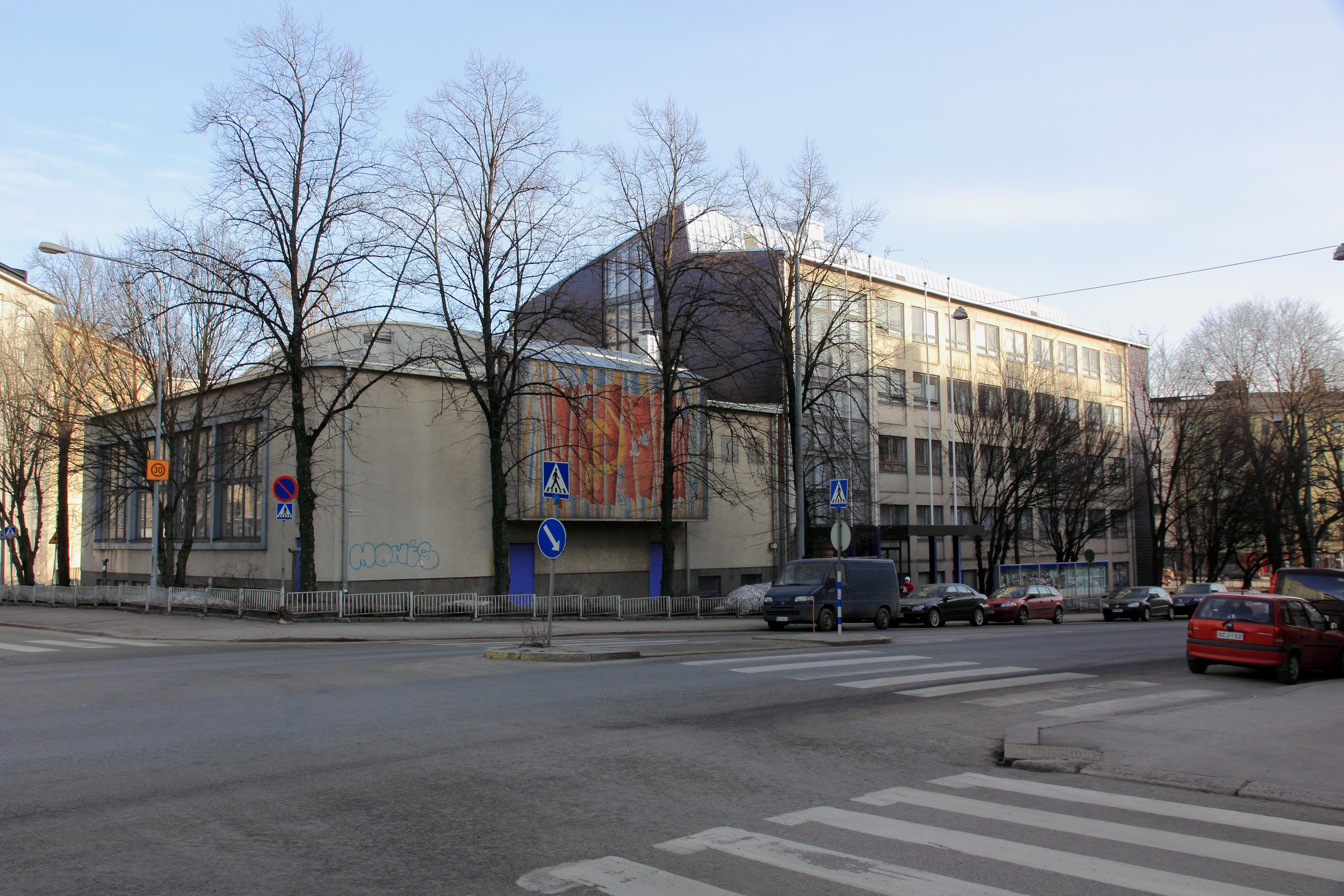
Russian Centre of Science and Culture in Helsinki

Russian language newspaper Spektr was founded in 1998, and radio channel Radio Sputnik (Russkoje Radio Helsinki) broadcast in the Russian language until 2018. Many small Russian Orthodox Churches have been founded in Finland.

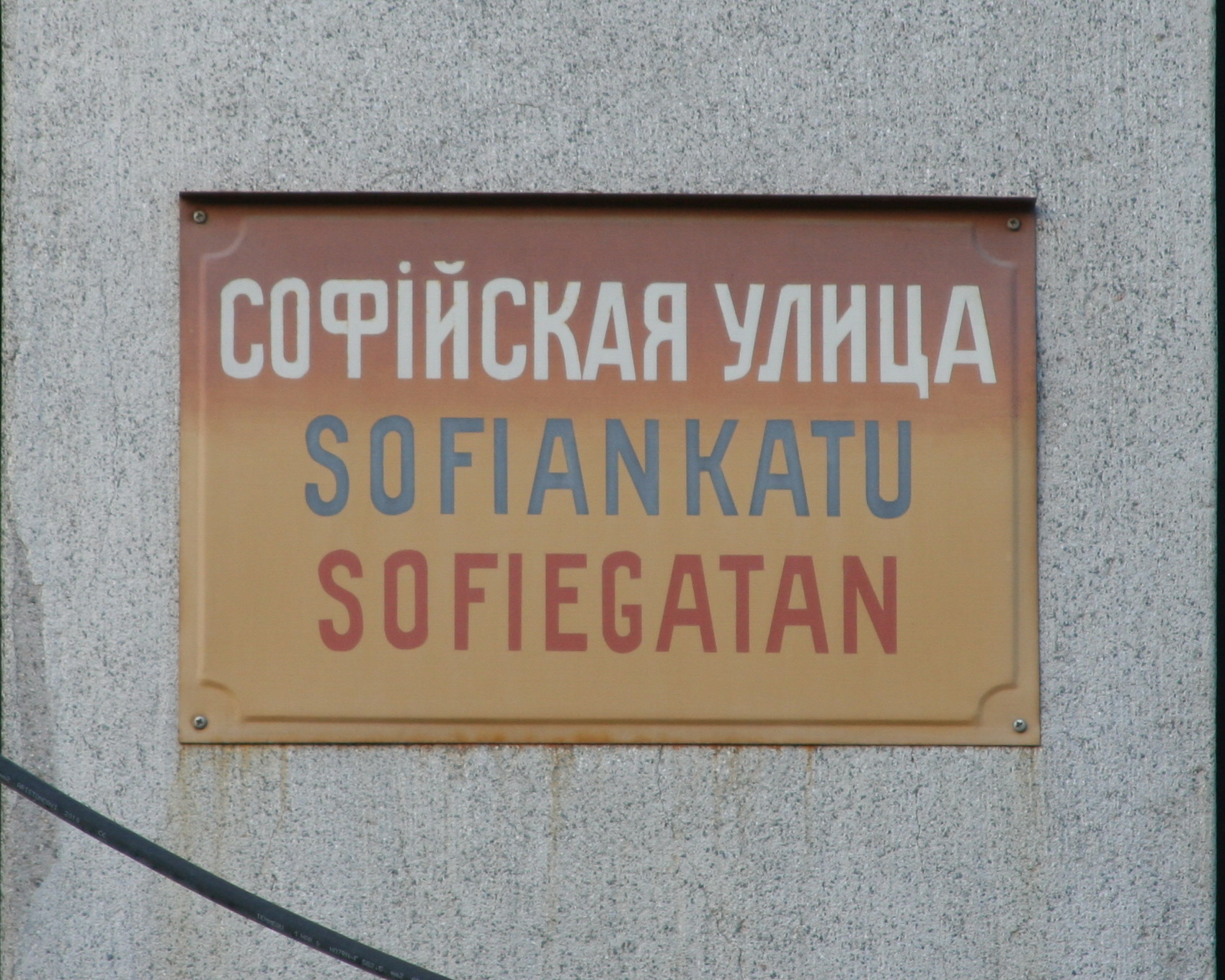
The Sofiankatu Trilingual street sign

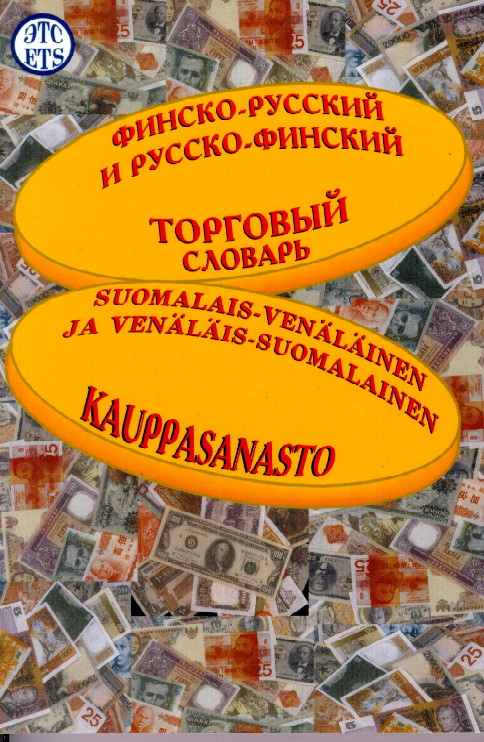
Finnish Russian and Russian Finnish Dictionary on Commerce

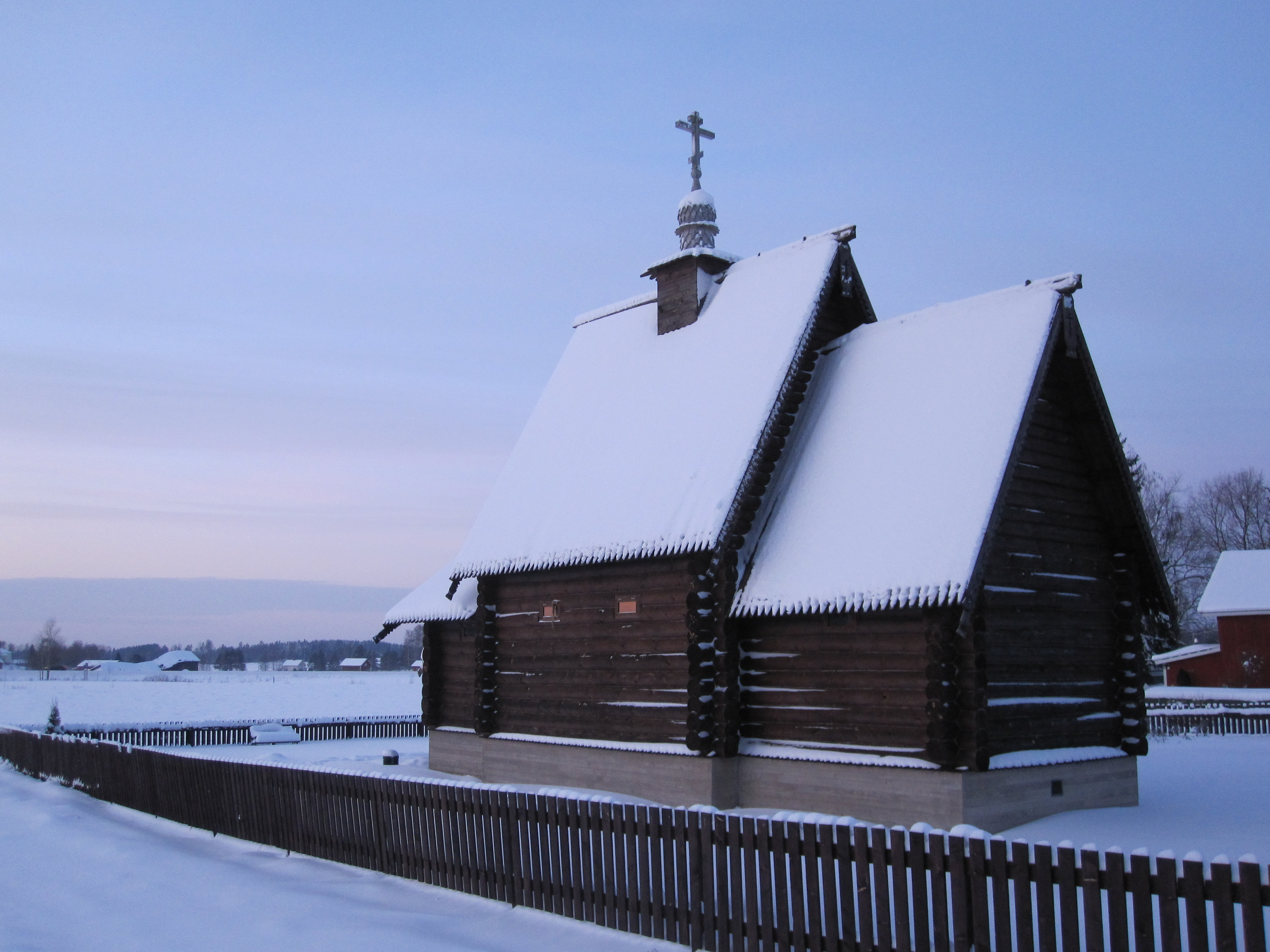
Church of Saint Serafim of Sarov in Stormi

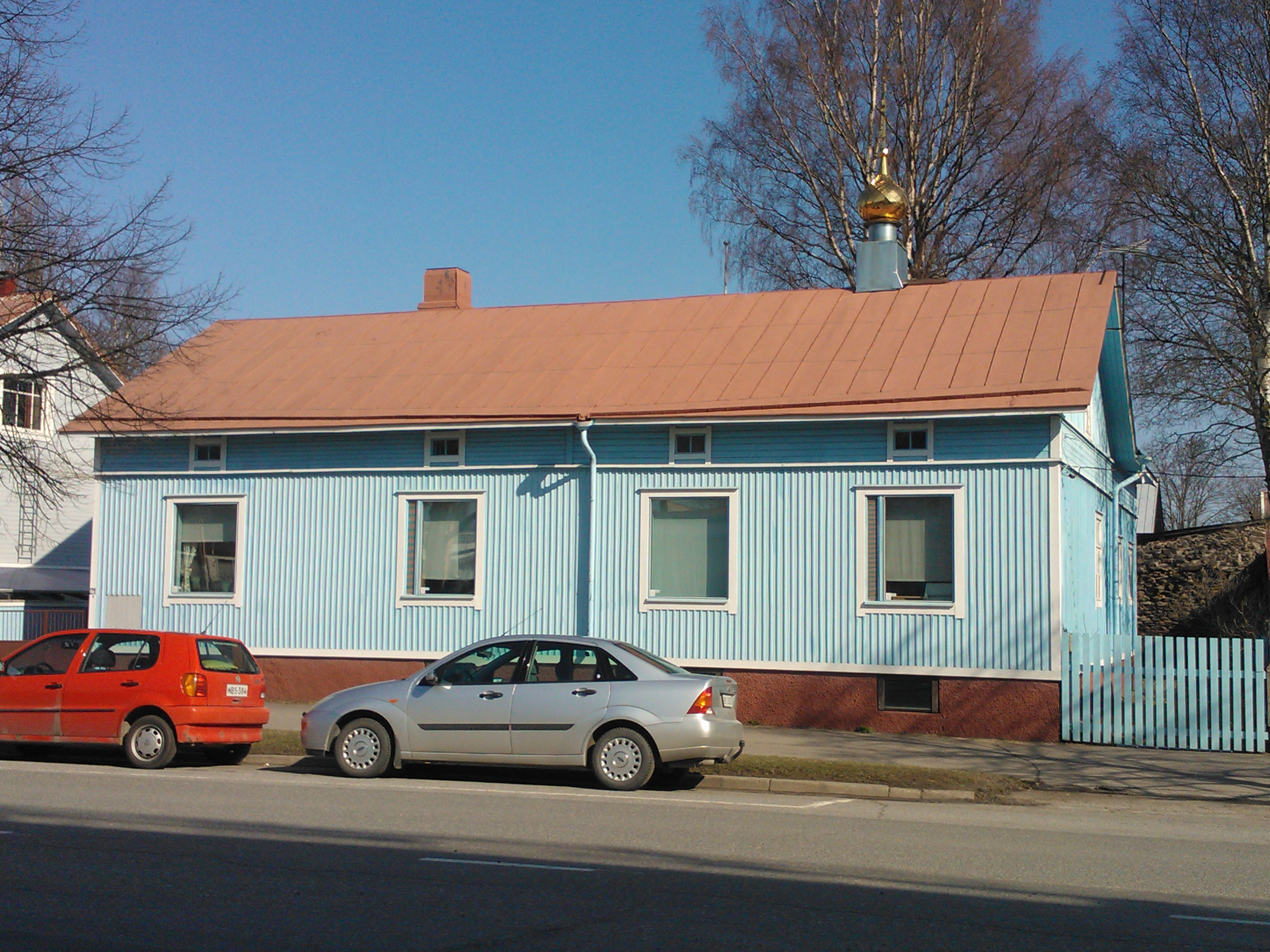
Russian Orthodox church in Pori

=== Manifestations of intolerance ===
In a 2012 poll, 12% of Russians in Finland reported that they had experienced a racially motivated hate crime (as compared to an average of 5% of Russians in all EU countries). 27% of Russians in Finland were victims of crimes the last 12 months, for example theft, attacks, frightening threats or harassment (as compared to 17% of Russians in EU).

In 2007, the European Commission against Racism and Intolerance reported in its Third report on Finland:

In its second report, ECRI recommended that action be taken to combat negative societal attitudes and manifestations of intolerance towards the members of Russian-speaking communities. However, representatives of these communities have indicated to ECRI that lack of determined action on the part of the Finnish authorities has allowed these attitudes and manifestations to intensify since ECRI's second report. ECRI is concerned at reports indicating that Russian-speakers have been the targets of violence, in at least one case resulting in death, and that the racist motivation of these acts has not always been adequately dealt with by the police. Racial harassment of Russian-speakers and racist bullying of Russian-speaking children at school have also been frequently reported. In addition, ECRI's attention has been drawn to the presence of anti-Russian material on the Internet inciting to racial hatred, and to the use of derogatory expressions to designate Russian-speakers as well as negative portrayal of these persons in the media.

== Notable people ==
- Boris Popper, White émigré
- Georgij Alafuzoff, admiral
- Kirill Babitzin, musician
- Sammy Babitzin, musician
- Aleksander Barkov, hockey player
- Danila Bulgakov, footballer
- Alexei Eremenko, footballer
- Roman Eremenko, footballer
- George de Godzinsky, composer
- Pasha Pozdniakova, model and social media influencer
- Anton Popovitch, footballer
- Valeri Popovitch, former footballer
- Maria Guzenina, journalist, TV host and politician
- Viktor Klimenko, singer
- Leo Komarov, hockey player (born in Narva, Estonia)
- Adam Markhiyev, Ingushetia-born footballer
- Lyudmila Markianova, linguist
- Natalia Nordman, an author and the wife of Ilya Repin
- Ilya Repin, realist painter, moved in Finland in 1899, a naturalized Finnish citizen in 1918
- the Sinebrychoff family
- Boris Rotenberg, football player
- Roman Rotenberg, entrepreneur, manager and ice hockey executive
- Anna Vyrubova, former lady-in-waiting and confidante of the last Russian Empress Alexandra Fyodorovna.
- Inna Latiševa, writer
- Vladislav Nobel-Oleinik, Russian Activist (Karelian National Movement)

== See also ==
- Finland-Russia Relations
- Russian diaspora
- Immigration to Finland
- Russians in Norway
- Russians in Sweden
- Chukhna
- Ryssä
