= Viinijärvi =

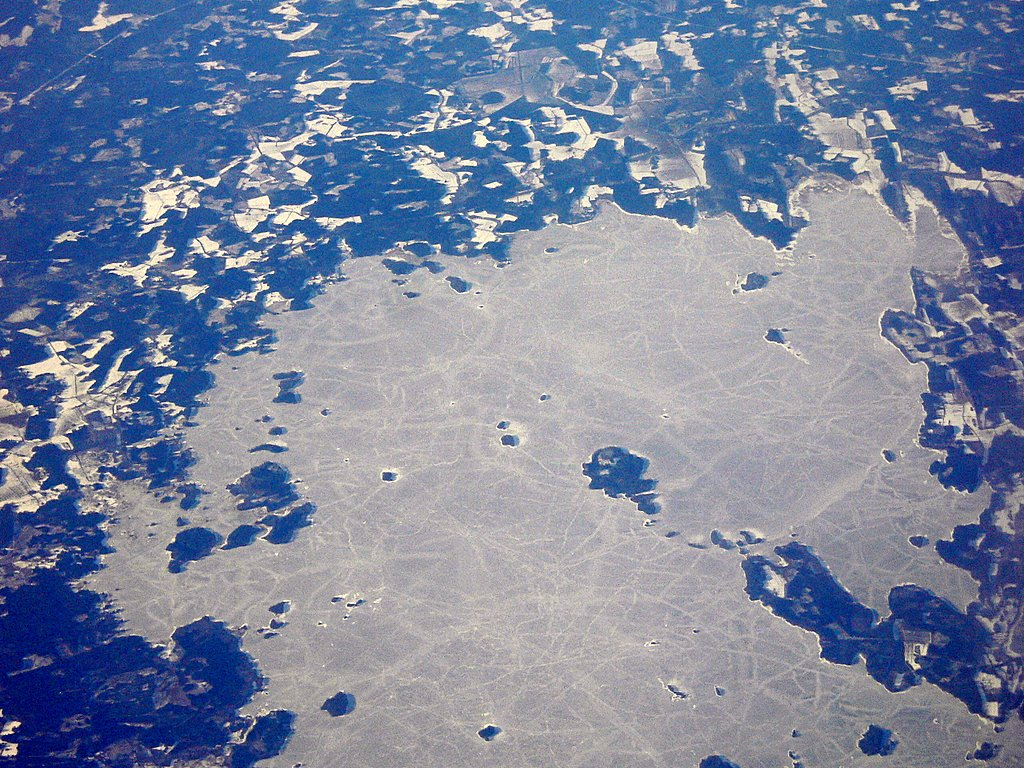
- Frozen Viinijärvi from air

- Location within Finland
- Coordinates: 62°44′N 29°17′E
- Lake type: Lake
- Primary inflows: Sukkulajoki, Sysmäjoki
- Primary outflows: Taipaleenjoki, Orivesi
- Catchment area: Vuoksi
- Basin countries: Finland
- Surface area: 134.91 km^{2} (52.09 sq mi)
- Average depth: 5.83 m (19.1 ft)
- Max. depth: 58.3 m (191 ft)
- Water volume: 0.786 km^{3} (637,000 acre⋅ft)
- Shore length^{1}: 426.5 km (265.0 mi)
- Surface elevation: 78.8 m (259 ft)
- Frozen: November–April
- Islands: Kurvalansaari, Karjalansaari, Suuri-Kulkevainen
- Settlements: Outokumpu
- ^{1} Shore length is not a well-defined measure.

Viinijärvi is a lake in Northern Karelia region in Finland and the 36th largest lake in Finland. It is connected to the Vuoksi main catchment area.

The municipalities of Polvijärvi, Outokumpu and Liperi are in the area.

== See also ==
- List of lakes in Finland
