= Nora Pöyhönen =

Finnish horticulturist and educator (1849–1938)

Alexandra Eleonora Pöyhönen
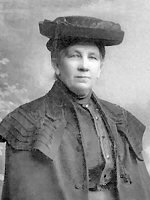
- Born: Alexandra Eleonora Europaeus; 16 July 1849; Liperi, Grand Duchy of Finland
- Died: 1 April 1938 (aged 88); Haapavesi, Finland
- Spouse: 1875→ Juho (Johan) Pöyhönen (1839–1906)
- Children: Hannes (died young); Maiju Eleonora (1879–1930); Matti (1880–1954); Anni Augusta (1882–1974); Elsa (1883–1940); Yrjö Emmanuel (1885–1973); Väinö (1890–1922)
- Parent(s): Anders Josef Europaeus and Selma Augusta née Lampa
- Awards: Medal of Merit of the White Rose of Finland; Cross of St. Stanislaus, 3rd class; Kordelin Foundation award for merits in home economics and gardening (1928); Finnish Women's Medal of Merit; Golden Medal of Merit of Federation of Agricultural Societies; 1st Prize in Saint Petersburg, Turku and Nikolaistad Garden Exhibition (1894)

Alexandra Eleonora "Nora" Pöyhönen (née Europaeus; 16 July 1849 – 1 April 1938) was a Finnish horticulturist and school director.

From an early age Pöyhönen was interested in agriculture, and later as a provost's wife, was able to focus on horticulture. She soon gained attention due to her excellent gardening skills.

Pöyhönen wanted to develop level of education and awareness of horticultural potential. After moving to Haapavesi she started a horticultural and cooking school, which taught both cultivation and utilisation of harvest. The school still operates today.

Pöyhönen had seven children of whom six survived to adulthood.

== Early life ==
Pöyhönen's parents were Liperi vicar Anders Josef Europaeus and Selma Augusta née Lampa. From a young age she was interested in agriculture. She wanted to become a primary school teacher but had to abandon her studies for health reasons.

In 1875 she married priest Juho Pöyhönen. When he was appointed chaplain of Pielisjärvi Nora Pöyhönen independently took care of the vicarage plantations, which eventually flourished so well that it caught attention of the Finnish Senate Agricultural Committee.

== Horticultural and cooking school ==
The family moved to Haapavesi in 1886. Nora Pöyhönen started to teach horticulture to the local children, but soon she realised, that there was no knowledge at their homes how to prepare food from the harvest. The 1860s devastating famine was fresh in people's memory, and Pöyhönen, following the spirit of the era, wanted to develop food production. She developed an idea about horticultural and cooking school, which was started in the vicarage. In 1903 she took a loan and ordered plans for a school from architect Wivi Lönn. The plans included the school building, furniture and gazebos. The school became soon renowned due to its park, including roses and versatile ornamental plantings. Pöyhönen made successful experiments for example in cranberry cultivation but maintained also old local varieties of plants.

Pöyhönen's school was the first one of its kind in Northern Europe, possibly in the whole world, and the northern location made it especially significant. The school improved especially women's standard of education in the Northern Ostrobothnian region.

Pöyhönen wrote a gardening textbook with her daughter Maiju. The 1927 issued Kodin kasvitarha was the main gardening textbook in number of Finnish agricultural schools for decades.

After Juho Pöyhönen's death in 1906, the deeply religious widow joined to Pentecostalism and had close contact with the local and some international leaders of the movement.

== Personal life ==
Nora and Juho Pöyhönen had seven children, six of whom survived to adulthood.

Pöyhönen was independent and punctilious by nature and had a strong aesthetic vision. She demanded quality and beauty. Writer Pentti Haanpää characterised her: "Nothing else was good to her than perfectly good".

== Legacy ==
After Nora Pöyhönen's death in 1938 and her descendants led and developed her school until 1990. Its study programme soon covered courses for home economics advisors, gardening teachers and apiarists. The school became state-owned in 1955 and it still exists as vocational school.
