= Anders Josef Europaeus =

Religious leader

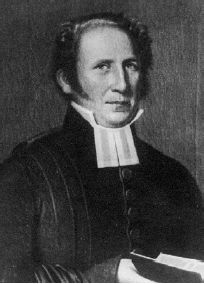
- Born: 21 November 1797; Kuolemajärvi, Old Finland, Russian Empire
- Died: 24 May 1870 (aged 72); Liperi, Grand Duchy of Finland
- Education: Imperial Academy of Turku (M.A.}
- Occupation: priest
- Spouses: 1834–1836: Sofia Wilhelmina née Boije af Gennäs (1814–1836); 1837→: Selma Augusta née Lampa (1814–1852)
- Children: Anders Theodor (1836–1912); Josefina Lovisa (1838–1915); Selma Maria (1840–1848); Johan Reinhold (1842–1874); Natalia Wilhelmina (1844–1926); Thekla Augusta (1845–1933); Hilda Johanna (1848–1921); Alexandra Eleonora, married Pöyhönen (1849–1938); Fridolf Emanuel (1849–1857); Matias Anselm (1852–1928)
- Parent(s): Isak Emanuel Europaeus and Maria Kristina née Steen
- Awards: Saint Stanislaus Cross, 3rd Class (1844); Saint Anna Cross, 3rd Class (1855); D.Th (1857); Saint Stanislaus Cross, 2nd Class (1866)

Anders Josef Europaeus (21 November 1797 – 24 May 1870) was a Finnish priest and vicar.

Europaeus studied in Turku where he was influenced by the early Fennoman movement. Following his appointment as vicar in Liperi in 1832, he developed a folk education and library system.

Europaeus was a member of a committee that planned new ecumenical law for the Grand Duchy of Finland. He took part in the Diet of Finland (1863–1864) as representative of clergy.

Europaeus was married twice and he had altogether ten children.

== Early years and studies ==
Europaeus was born in Kuolemajärvi which was part of Old Finland, ruled by Russian Empire, major part of Finland still being under Swedish rule until 1809. His parents were chaplain of Parikkala Isak Emanuel Europaeus and Maria Kristina née Steen. He completed his matriculation exam in 1817. Europaeus was interested in careers as teacher or theologist. Eventually, he opted the latter and continued his studies in Theological Faculty at Imperial Academy of Turku.

In Viipuri Europaeus had got influenced about local Fennoman movement which emphasised education and awareness. After moving to Turku, the contemporary political-artistic Finnish national movement called Turku Romanticism influenced his nationalistic and religious views. He became friends with Carl Axel Gottlund who was a notable figure in Finnish national awakening. Europaeus later helped him at selling his book Otava.

Europaeus regarded the then applied church service ritual boring and hoped it to be more experiential.

Europaeus studied at the academy until 1820. He worked as teacher of Russian language in Loviisa in 1821–1822. In 1822–1825 Europaeus taught Russian and German languages in Savonlinna Regional School; he graduated as Master of Arts in 1823. Following to Savonlinna, Europaeus continued as teacher in Viipuri.

== Clerical career ==
Europaeus was appointed vicar of Liperi in 1832. Typical to education-oriented priests of his time, he also promoted development of agriculture, administration and care of the poor.

At an early stage of Europaeus's career, Liperi was under effect of pietistic preacher Henrik Renqvist who had upset many priests of the area. Instead of confrontation, Europaeus wanted to mediate between Renqvist and the church. Europaeus opposed the seclusion of the pietists but respected their religiosity. He placated the other priests' attitude towards pietists.

Europaeus opposed the hard church sanctions; he thought that their time was over and regarded that they cause more harm than good.

In 1868 Europaeus founded an orphanage to raise children who had lost their parents in the previous famine.

== Developing of education ==
Europaeus wanted to develop the ethnically Finnish culture and education; he contributed frequently newspaper Sanan Saattaja Wiipurista. In 1857 Europaeus founded in Liperi the first folk school which operated four weeks every autumn and spring. Although the school was discontinued already in 1860, Europaeus had managed to arouse interest in education amongst the peasants, and a new school was established in 1869.

Europaeus wanted to develop and widen the education of the clergy. He initiated foundation of Diocese Library that was funded by annual fees collected from priests. The library did not only consist religious books and newspapers, but also included a wide selection of books about human sciences. In 1845 Europaeus founded the first Finnish-speaking folk library in Liperi; the annual five-ruble financing came from the funds of the parish. While large proportion of the books were religious, Europaeus particularly wanted to include into the selection temporal and entertaining reading.

Europaeus was interested at investigating Finnish, in particular Karelian history. He wrote several articles about history of settlement in the area. His writings were mainly without scientific basis, and he was largely inspired by Kalevala. In 1843 he was invited to become member of the Danish Royal Nordic Society of Antiquaries which also published his writings.

Although libraries and schools started by Europaeus remained short-living, he managed to create favourable atmosphere for folk education.

== Political career ==
During the 1850s Europaeus was member in a committee assigned by the Finnish senate to prepare a new ecumenical law. Due to this, he was awarded Doctor of Theology title.

In the 1860s Europaeus took part in politics. He represented clergy in so-called January Committee in 1862 and in Diet of Finland in 1863–1864. He was a moderate conservative, reserved against large reforms and wanting to proceed with small steps in order to avoid of major failures. He was against the municipal administration reform, but on the other hand supported equal rights to over 21-year-old men and women to manage themselves and their own properties. He initiated founding an upper primary school in Joensuu; this was accepted, and Europaeus became the first inspector of the subsequently founded school. His other initiative, founding a Finno-Ugric faculty in the Imperial Alexander University in Finland was rejected, because it was seen as interfering to internal affairs of the university.

== Family ==
Europaeus was married twice. In 1834 he married Sofia née Boije af Gennäs, who died already in 1836 soon after giving birth to son Anders Theodor. In 1837 Europaeus married Selma née Lampa, daughter of Helsinki merchant, with whom he got nine children.

== Bibliography ==
- Karjalan ajan-tiedot (1859)
- Om det Nöteborgska fredsfördraget och dess följder (part of Annaler for nordisk oldkyndighed; 1860)
- Några hypotheser angående Väinölä, Pohjola och andra i Kalevala förekommande namn (part of Annaler for nordisk oldkyndighed; 1861)
