= Viinijärvi railway station =

Railway station in Liperi, North Karelia, Finland

Viinijärvi
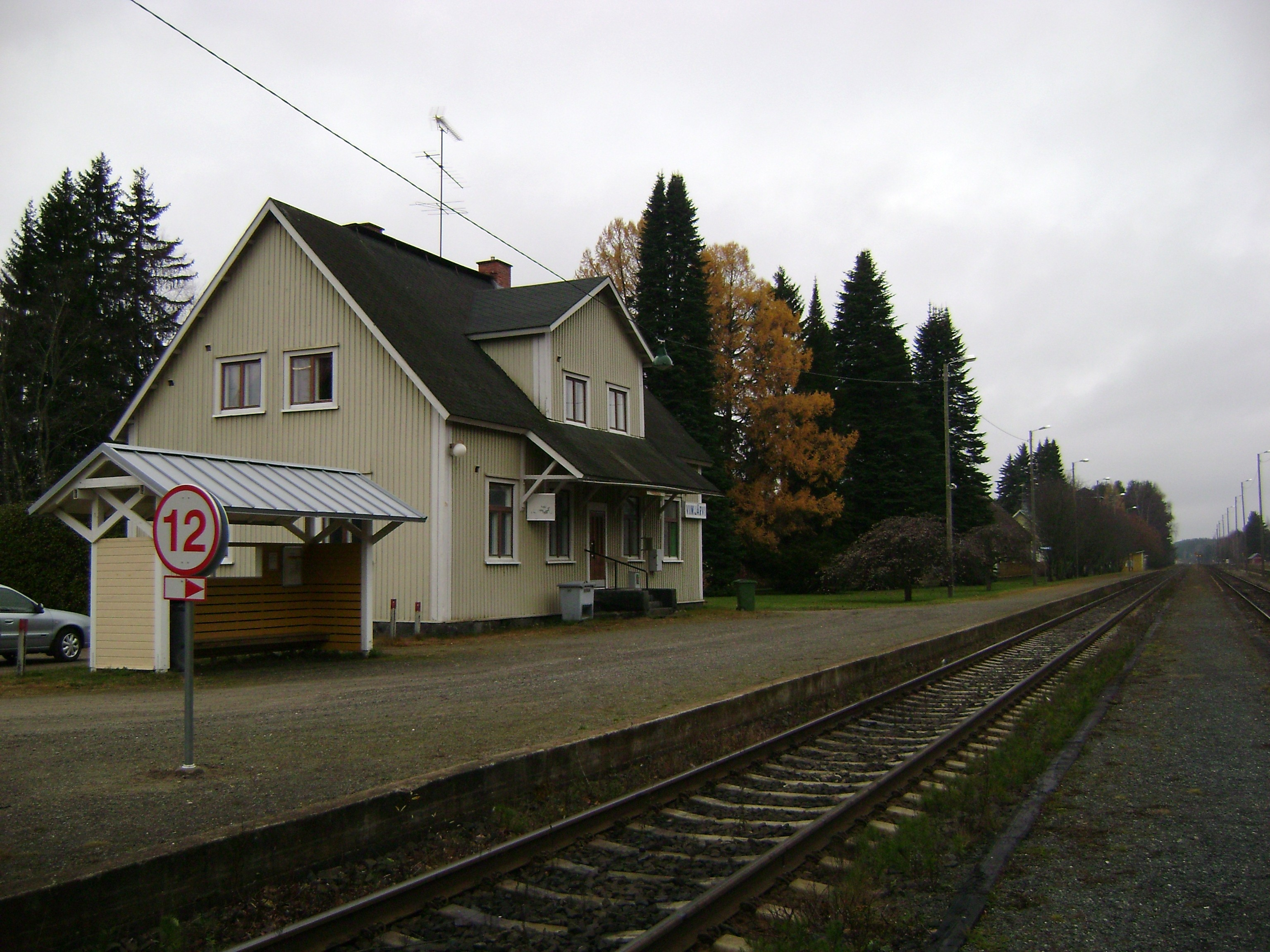
- Viinijärvi railway station

General information
- Location: Liperi; Finland
- Coordinates: 62.64193°N 29.23590°E
- System: Railway station
- Operator: VR
- Platforms: 1
- Tracks: 3

Construction
- Parking: Gravel parking lot, no designated spaces
- Cycle facilities: None
- Accessible: No

History
- Opened: 1941
Location

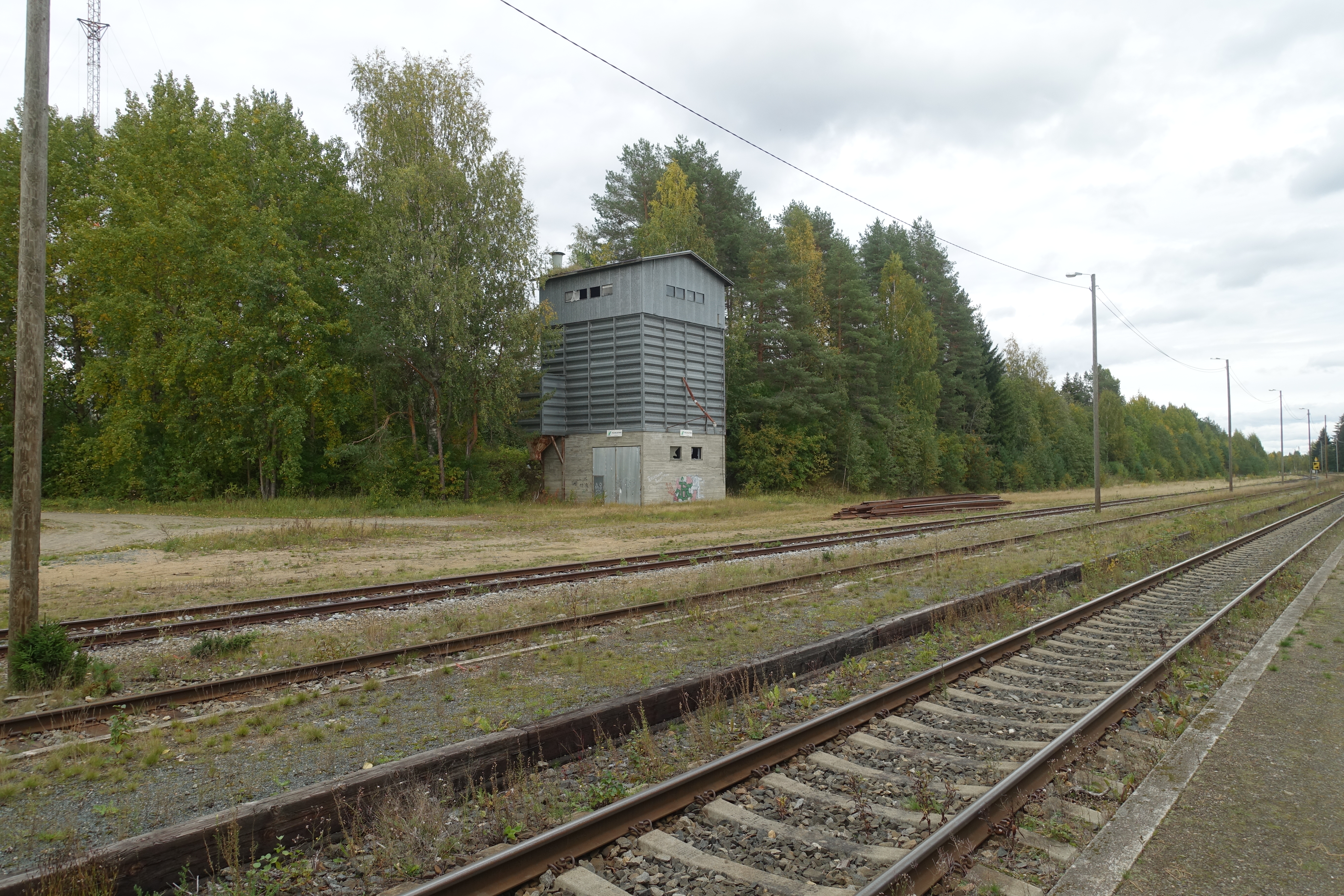
The abandoned railyard

Viinijärvi railway station is a railway station located in the municipality of Liperi, North Karelia, Finland. The railway station gets four services per day every day, two to Pieksämäki and two to Joensuu. There are no ticket machines at the station. The station features a gravel platform and a gravel parking lot. It also has a garden, an old freight building, and a wooden shelter.
