= Vilho Turunen =

Finnish trade union functionary and politician (1923–1973)

Vilho Turunen (16 December 1923, Polvijärvi - 8 February 1973) was a Finnish agricultural worker, logger, trade union functionary and politician. He was a member of the Parliament of Finland from 1958 to 1962. Turunen was at first a member of the Social Democratic Party of Finland (SDP) and later of the Social Democratic Union of Workers and Smallholders (TPSL).
