= Heikki Soininen =

Finnish politician

Heikki Soininen (7 January 1891, Polvijärvi – 19 April 1957) was a Finnish farmer and politician. He served as a Member of the Parliament of Finland from 1933 until his death in 1957, representing the Agrarian League.
