= Liperi =

Liperi Libelits
- Municipality
- Liperin kunta Libelits kommun
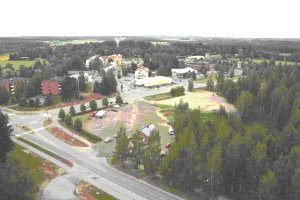
- View towards the centre of the municipality from the church tower

- Coat of arms

- Location of Liperi in Finland
- Interactive map of Liperi
- Coordinates: 62°32′N 029°23′E
- Country: Finland
- Region: North Karelia
- Sub-region: Joensuu
- Charter: 1875

Government
  - Municipal manager: Pellervo Hämäläinen

Area (2018-01-01)
  - Total: 1,161.23 km^{2} (448.35 sq mi)
  - Land: 727.19 km^{2} (280.77 sq mi)
  - Water: 434.33 km^{2} (167.70 sq mi)
  - Rank: 118th largest in Finland

Population (2025-12-31)
  - Total: 11,980
  - Rank: 85th largest in Finland
  - Density: 16.47/km^{2} (42.7/sq mi)

Population by native language
  - Finnish: 96.7% (official)
  - Others: 3.3%

Population by age
  - 0 to 14: 18.2%
  - 15 to 64: 59.3%
  - 65 or older: 22.5%
- Time zone: UTC+02:00 (EET)
  - Summer (DST): UTC+03:00 (EEST)
- Website: www.liperi.fi

Liperi (Swedish: Libelits) is a municipality of Finland. It is located in the North Karelia region. Liperi is a community of 11,980 (31 December 2025) with the growth rate of 83 newcomers in 11 months in 2007. The population density is 16.47 inhabitants per square kilometre (42.7/sq mi). The municipality covers an area of 1,161.23 square kilometres (448.35 sq mi) of which 434.33 km^{2} (167.70 sq mi) is water.

The municipality is unilingually Finnish.

Neighbouring municipalities of Liperi are Heinävesi, Joensuu, Kontiolahti, Outokumpu, Polvijärvi, Pyhäselkä, Rääkkylä and Savonlinna.

The municipality of Liperi has increased in population for several years, as a side effect of the attraction of the nearby city of Joensuu. Liperi is among the fastest growing municipalities in Northern Karelia. Especially the areas of Ylämylly, Honkalampi and Jyrinkylä, situated close to each other.

The Finnish member of the parliament Eero Reijonen lives in Liperi.

The highest recorded natural temperature in Finland, 37.2 °C (99.0 °F), was measured at Joensuu Airport in Liperi on July 29, 2010.

In July 2021, Saariston Puoti, a resting place on the shores of Lake Ruokosalmi in Liperi, was chosen as the best rest stop in Finland.

== Church village ==
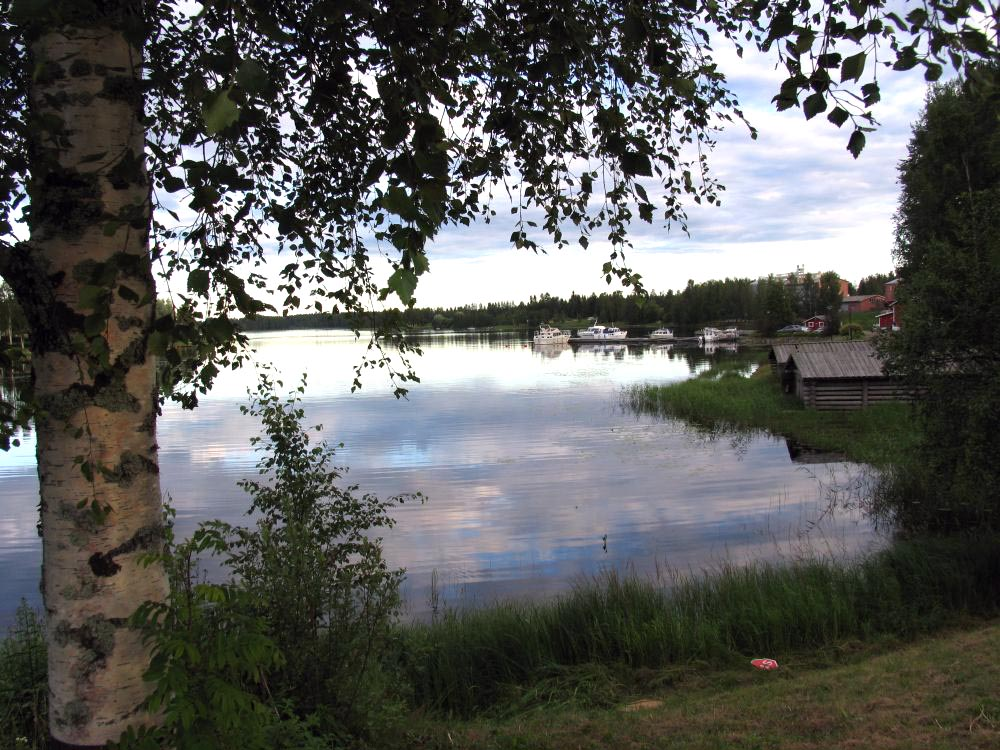
View of the Liperi harbour, on a summer night

The view of the church village of Liperi is dominated by the stout red brick church of Liperi, which was built from 1854 to 1858. The old wooden municipality house is among the oldest buildings in the region, and discussions about its protection have been ongoing since the 1990s.

The centre of the church village was changed outwardly, when a bypassing highway connection was started in summer 2007. In the process, the place of the summer market moved to the yard of the Liperi stage for one summer.

== Villages ==
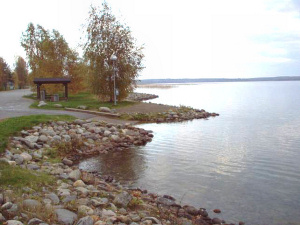
Lake Kuorinka

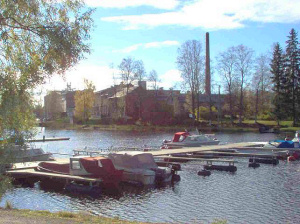
The dairy in Liperi produces pure products from Finnish nature.

Villages in Liperi include Härkinvaara, Kaatamo, Korpivaara, Mattisenlahti, Risti, Roukalahti, Salokylä, Tutjunniemi, Vaivio, Viinijärvi and Ylämylly.

== Municipality join plans ==
In November 2006, Liperi and Outokumpu announced their plan to discuss a municipality join. On 13 November 2006, the municipal council of Liperi decided, with votes 24 to 11, to only discuss a municipality join with Outokumpu, not with other municipalities. The municipalities already have a common director of social and health services.

On 19 June 2007, the municipality council decided not to pursue the municipality join with the city of Outokumpu.

== Schools ==
=== Liperi gymnasium ===
The Liperi gymnasium operates in the Liperi municipal centre at a distance of 25 kilometres (16 mi) from Joensuu. The gymnasium and classes 5 to 9 of the Liperi school form an employment community for about 700 people.

On 15 December 2006, the education board of Liperi decided to propose the discontinuation of the Liperi gymnasium. The number of students in the Liperi gymnasium had declined throughout the entire 2000s (decade). In a poll conducted in autumn 2006, only two 9th class students in Liperi announced they were applying for their own municipality's gymnasium, 50 announced they were applying for gymnasia elsewhere.

On 18 December 2006, the municipal council decided that from autumn 2007 onwards, the gymnasium shall no longer accept new students. During the school year 2007–2008, there were 66 students studying in the second and third classes of the gymnasium.

=== Other schools ===
Other schools in Liperi include schools in Ylämylly, Viinijärvi, Käsämä and Mattisenlahti.

== Parishes ==
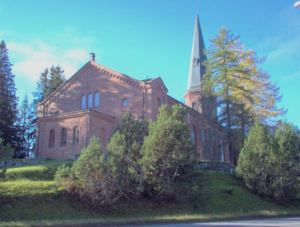
The Evangelical Lutheran church, the fifth in this place at Church Bay

The Evangelical Lutheran parish of Liperi covers the whole area of the municipality after the parish of Viinijärvi was annexed to it in 1995.

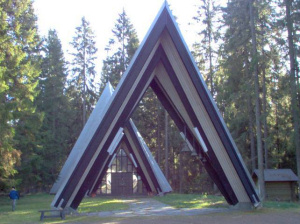
The orthodox chapel

Viinijärvi is the centre of the Taipale Orthodox parish, the parish reaches to Polvijärvi and Outokumpu. The current church of Taipale was built in 1906.

== Cottage activity ==
The first cottage activity society in Northern Karelia was founded in Liperi in 2004. The society is a bond between the summer cottage inhabitants, and can make initiatives and suggestions to the municipal council. Every spring, the council sends a letter to the summer cottage inhabitants, containing general information about the municipality and instructions on how to propose representatives. Later, a list of representatives and cottage-specific vote ballots are posted.

The municipality also organises common shore fishing and summer theatre nights for the summer cottage inhabitants. There are about 3000 summer cottages in Liperi.

== Transportation ==
Liperi used to have three cable ferries. The ferry in Käsämä was replaced with a bridge in 1988 and the Onkisalmi ferry in 1974. Only the Arvinsalmi ferry between Liperi and Rääkkylä remains.

The Joensuu Airport is located in Liperi. The Viinijärvi railway station has regional train connections to Joensuu and Pieksämäki. The nearest railway station in the western parts is the Vihtari railway station.

== Culture and sports ==
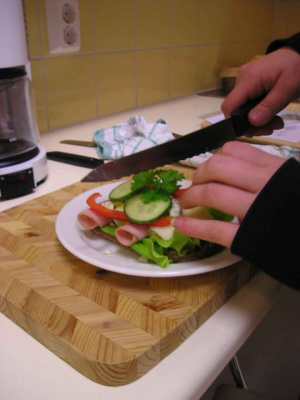
The contest "Snacks from bread" for the seventh graders at school is held every year. The best looking and healthiest snacks are awarded.

The Liperi stage in the church village holds dance contests: it held the humppa Finnish championships in June 2007.

The sports centre in Liperi is Pärnävaara, which is the largest ski contest centre in Northern Karelia. Pärnävaara has hosted the Jukola relay orienteering contest in 2000.

Viinijärven Urheilijat rose to the women's Superpesis league in 2007, when the number of teams was raised to 12. ViU got second place in Ykköspesis, the decision of series increase was made in November. ViU has also won a championship in Superpesis league.

=== Sports societies in Liperi ===
Honkalampi-Ylämylly sport club, Karjalan Kopse (riding), Karjalan Käki, Kivekkäät, Leppälahden Uskallus, Liperin Avantouimarit, Liperi Ski Club, Liperin Kelo, Liperin Kiekko (icehockey), Liperi Women Gymnasts, Liperi Riders, Liperin Taimi, Sulkaman Kipinä, Vaivion Tarmo, Viinijärvi Women Gymnasts, Viinijärvi Sports Club, Ylämyllyn Tennis, Ylämyllyn Yllätys (football), Liperi Volley.

== Literature ==
- Pekka Pakarinen: Suur-Liperistä leipäpitäjäksi: Liperin historia, 2006
- Tutju – kylä Saimaan latvavesillä, village history, 2002

== Notable people ==
- Anders Josef Europaeus, priest, Doctor of Theology, member of the diet
- Anu Kaipainen, writer, worked as a Finnish language teacher in Viinijärvi
- Ski brothers Martti and Tauno Lappalainen. Their memorial stone (Veikko Jalava, 1967) is located in the church village. They represented Liperin Kivekkäät.
- Kari Lehtola, volleyball player.
- Multiple marathon winner Yrjö Pesonen represented Liperin Taimi in his career. He scored 7 Finnish Championships from 1992 to 2006.
- Wimme Saari, Sápmi artist

== International relations ==
=== Twin towns – Sister cities ===
Liperi is twinned with:

- Aalborg, Denmark
