= Outokumpu, Finland =

Outokumpu
- Town
- Outokummun kaupunki Outokumpu stad
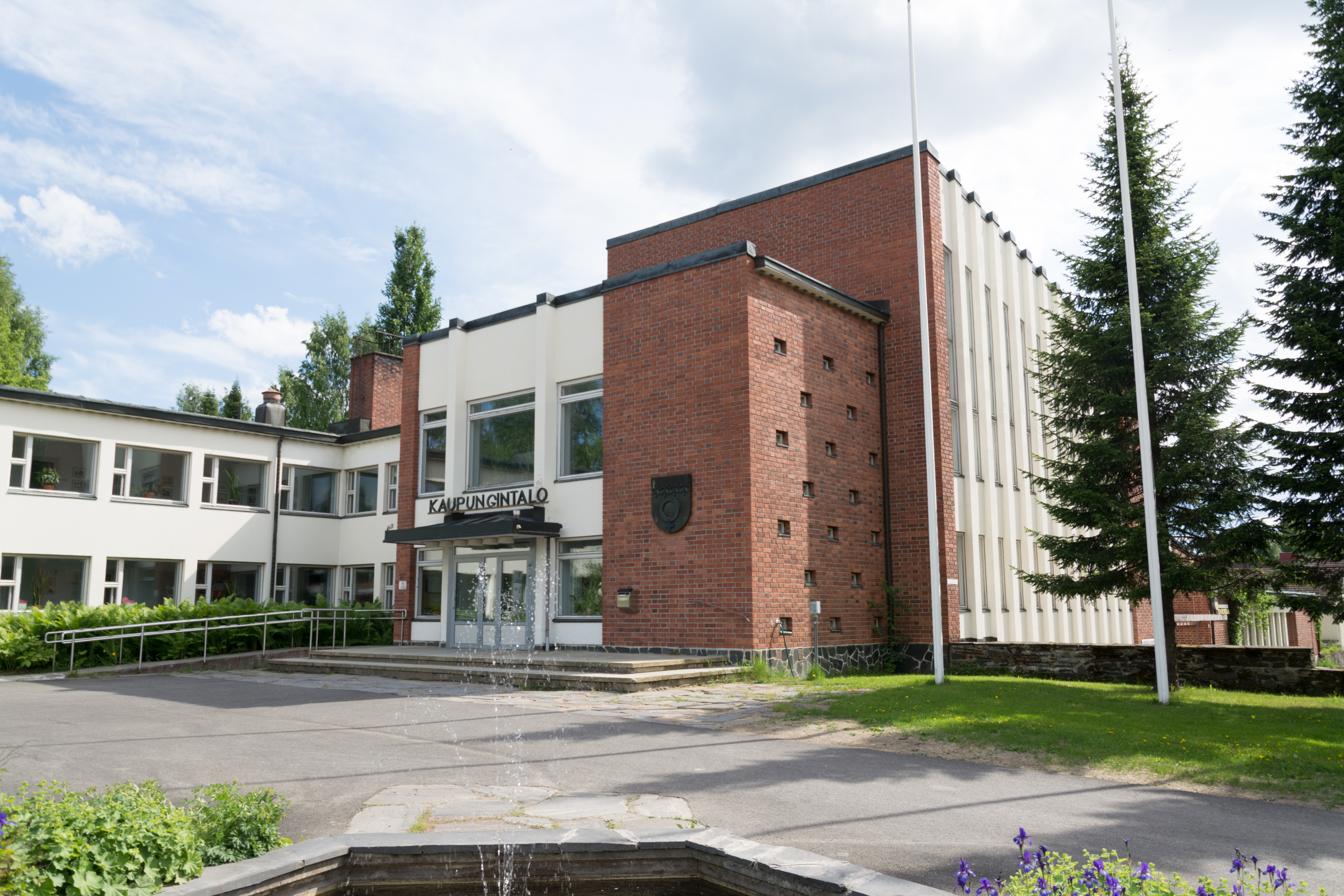
- Outokumpu Town Hall

- Coat of arms

- Location of Outokumpu in Finland
- Interactive map of Outokumpu
- Coordinates: 62°43.5′N 029°01′E
- Country: Finland
- Region: North Karelia
- Sub-region: Joensuu
- Market town: 1968
- Town privileges: 1977

Government
  - Town manager: Pekka Hyvönen

Area (2018-01-01)
  - Total: 584.05 km^{2} (225.50 sq mi)
  - Land: 445.87 km^{2} (172.15 sq mi)
  - Water: 138.22 km^{2} (53.37 sq mi)
  - Rank: 195th largest in Finland

Population (2025-12-31)
  - Total: 6,365
  - Rank: 142nd largest in Finland
  - Density: 14.28/km^{2} (37.0/sq mi)

Population by native language
  - Finnish: 91.8% (official)
  - Others: 8.2%

Population by age
  - 0 to 14: 13.8%
  - 15 to 64: 53.2%
  - 65 or older: 33%
- Time zone: UTC+02:00 (EET)
  - Summer (DST): UTC+03:00 (EEST)
- Website: www.outokummunkaupunki.fi

Outokumpu is a town and municipality of Finland. It is located in the North Karelia region, 48 kilometres (30 mi) west of Joensuu and 92 kilometres (57 mi) east of Kuopio. The municipality has a population of 6,365 (31 December 2025) and covers an area of 584.05 square kilometres (225.50 sq mi) of which 138.22 km^{2} (53.37 sq mi) is water. The population density is 14.28 inhabitants per square kilometre (37.0/sq mi). The most important road connection in the locality is Highway 9.

Neighbouring municipalities are Heinävesi, Kaavi, Liperi, Polvijärvi and Tuusniemi. The municipality is unilingually Finnish.

The fir-twigged line in the coat of arms of Outokumpu refers to the name Kuusjärvi (literally "spruce lake") at the time the municipality's coat of arms was established, and the copper symbol refers to Outokumpu Oyj's mines, which later gave their name to the entire township. The coat of arms was designed by Olof Eriksson, and the Kuusjärvi municipal council approved it at its meeting on November 21, 1952. The Ministry of the Interior approved the coat of arms for use on February 18, 1953.

The Finnish vocational school Riveria operates in Outokumpu among other cities.

== History ==
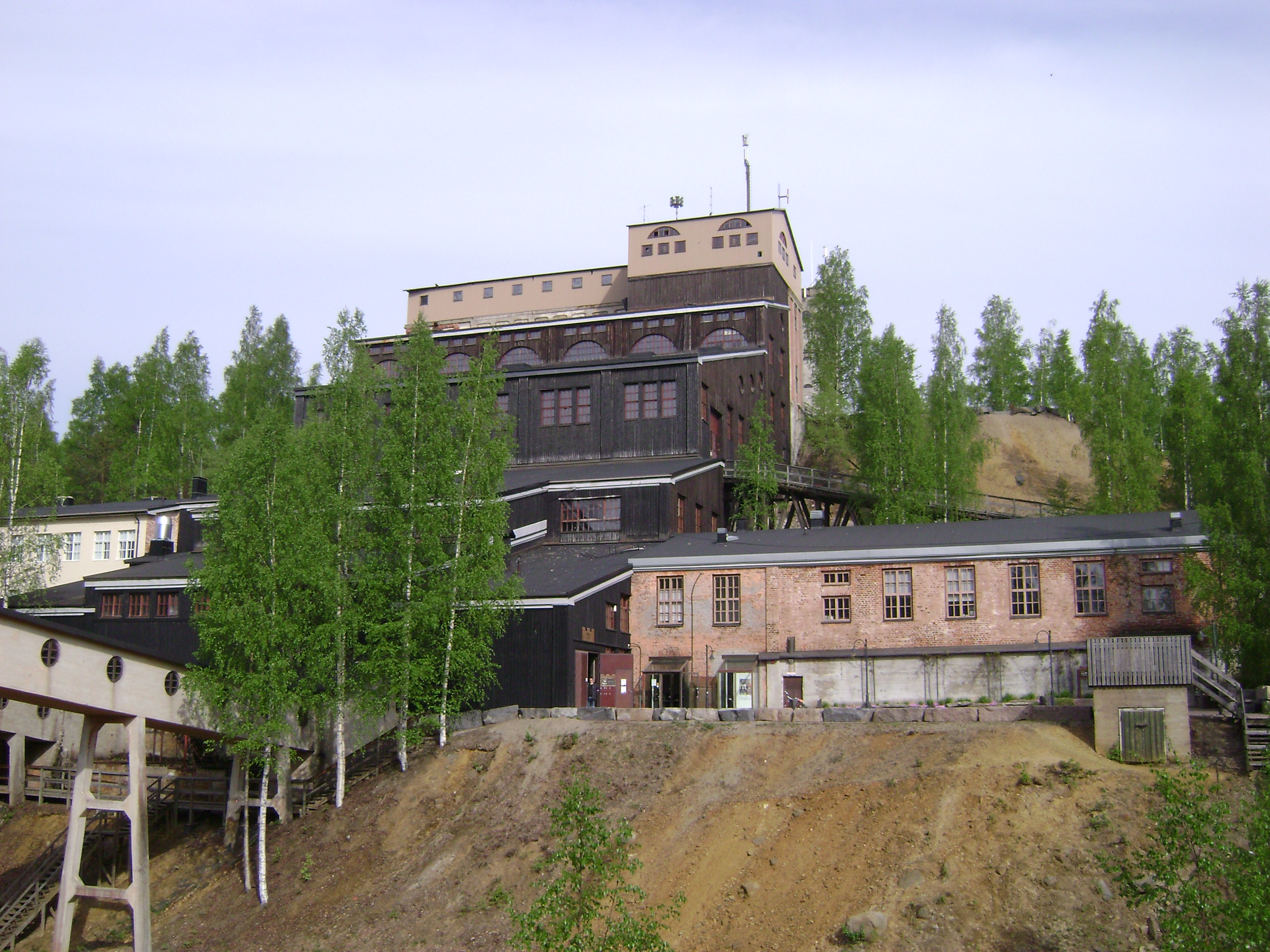
Outokumpu Old Mine

The municipality was formerly known as Kuusjärvi. In 1968 it became a market town and was renamed as Outokumpu (literally 'strange hill', 'queer hill') after the copper mine located in the municipality. Outokumpu gained town privileges in 1977. The town began to form around the Outokumpu Copper Mine, which was active from 1913 to 1989. The old mining area is still clearly visible as it is situated in the town centre and nowadays it has been developed into a tourist attraction.

== Economy ==
The steel manufacturer Outokumpu originates from the town of Outokumpu. Outokumpu Copper Mine was a big employer in Outokumpu from 1913 until 1989 when the mine was shut down.

In Outokumpu there is a rather vibrant industrial park, which was founded in 1979 when it became apparent that the mine was to be shut down during the next decade. Most of the town's biggest employers are situated in Outokumpu Industrial Park as it has the role of organizing and developing the local businesses.

Nowadays Outokumpu is home to many technology industry companies such as Outotec Turula workshop, Finelcomp Oy, Okun Hammaspyörä Oy, Okun Koneistuspalvelu Oy and Outokummun Metalli Oy. It is said that in Outokumpu there is one of the highest densities of CNC machines and tools in Finland compared to population.

Relevant employers from other branches of the economy include among others: Piippo Oyj, Mondo Minerals, and HK Scan Finland.

There was some 2,502 jobs in Outokumpu in 2014.

Since 2025, the town has hosted Northern Seasons, a coliving and coworking community for digital nomads and remote workers.

== Tourism ==
Main tourist attraction in Outokumpu is the Outokumpu Old Mine. An area where you can find a mining museum, theme park Children's mine for children, some restaurants and a Disc golf track that surrounds the old mining area.

Other destinations of interest are the Outokumpu Nature Park, Keretti Golf track (in an old mining area), lake Juojärvi and the municipal Sports and Swimming Centre.

During summer season you can go for a canoe trip on the lakes surrounding the Outokumpu Nature Park. You can also go fishing in Children's fishing Oasis and rent a beach sauna from touristic services.

== Culture ==
=== Food ===
In the 1980s, meat soup called kaivossoppa ("mine soup") and rye-lingonberry porridge were named as Outokumpu's traditional parish dishes.

== International relations ==
=== Twin towns — Sister cities ===
- Kohtla-Järve, Estonia
- Schöningen, Germany

== See also ==
- Lieksa
- Pyhäjärvi
- Siilinjärvi
