= Yrjö Pesonen =

Finnish politician

Antti Yrjö Pesonen (27 December 1888, Kauhava – 2 March 1966) was a Finnish farmer, journalist, insurance executive and politician. He served as a Member of the Parliament of Finland from 1919 to 1922, representing the Agrarian League.
