= Russian Orthodox Church in Finland =

Russian Orthodox Church in Finland Ру́сская правосла́вная це́рковь в Финля́ндии
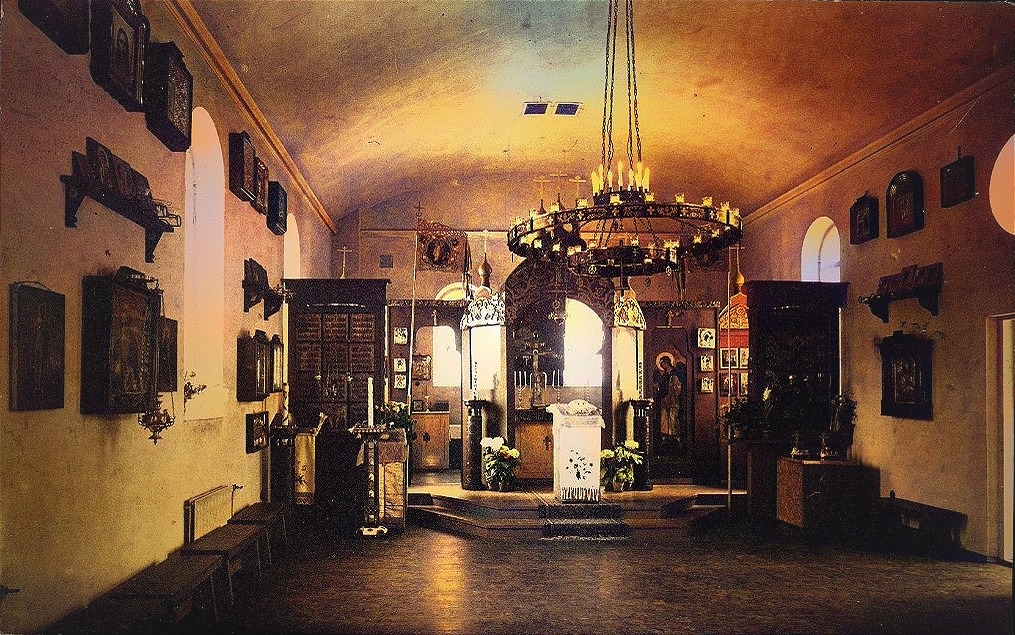
- Interior of the St. Nikolaos Church, 1939.
- Classification: Eastern Orthodox
- Primate: Patriarch of Moscow and all Rus' Kirill
- Language: Church Slavonic (worship), Finnish, Russian, Swedish
- Liturgy: Byzantine Rite
- Headquarters: Patriarchal: Moscow, Russia; Jurisdictional: Helsinki, Finland
- Territory: Finland
- Founder: Fr. Grigory Svetlovsky; Fr. Nikolai Shchukin
- Independence: 1926
- Reunion: 1945
- Recognition: Semi-autonomous
- Separated from: Orthodox Church of Finland
- Parishes: 2
- Members: 4,200
- Places of worship: 5
- Other names: Patriarchal Parishes in Finland (Патриа́ршие прихо́ды в Финля́ндии)
- Official website: www.finland.orthodoxy.ru www.svt-nikolai.org/en/

The Russian Orthodox Church in Finland (Finnish: Venäjän ortodoksinen kirkko Suomessa, Russian: Ру́сская правосла́вная це́рковь в Финля́ндии) is a semi-autonomous part of the Russian Orthodox Church formed in 1926. An official headquarters of the Moscow Patriarchate, led by Archpriest Viktor Lioutik, was opened in Helsinki in 1999.

Founded in 1926 by Russian émigrés, the Russian Orthodox Church in Finland is organized into two parishes, the St. Nikolaos Orthodox Parish in Helsinki, and the Orthodox Pokrova congregation. They maintain a total of five churches, with three located in Helsinki, one in Pori, and one in Sastamala.

The total number of registered members in 2022 was 4,200, with the largest community being the St. Nikolaos Orthodox Parish with more than 3,700 members. The Spaso-Preobrazenskaja community in Tampere is under the jurisdiction of the Russian Orthodox Church Outside Russia, and is therefore administratively separate.

The Russian Orthodox Church in Finland does not have its own separate bishop and is formally subject directly to Patriarch Kirill. However, in practice, the church's parishes remain self-governing, with no direct intervention from Kirill.

== History ==
=== Formation ===
The Orthodox Church of Finland separated from the Russian Orthodox Church in 1923 as a result of the Russian Revolution of 1917 and the Independence of Finland. The Finnish government, due to Russia's historical efforts at Russification and later Bolshevik interference, encouraged the independence of the Orthodox church from the Moscow Patriarchate.

Members of the Russian Orthodox community in Finland, including laymen, priests, nuns and monks, were dissatisfied with the changes introduced by the Finnish hierarchs, and faced repression by the authorities of the Orthodox Church of Finland. A major point of contention was the adoption of the Gregorian calendar by the Finnish church, seen as a betrayal of Orthodox tradition. They had hoped to retain practices that had been standard in Finland prior to 1923, such as the use of Church Slavonic in liturgy and the Julian calendar, and therefore formed their own parishes.

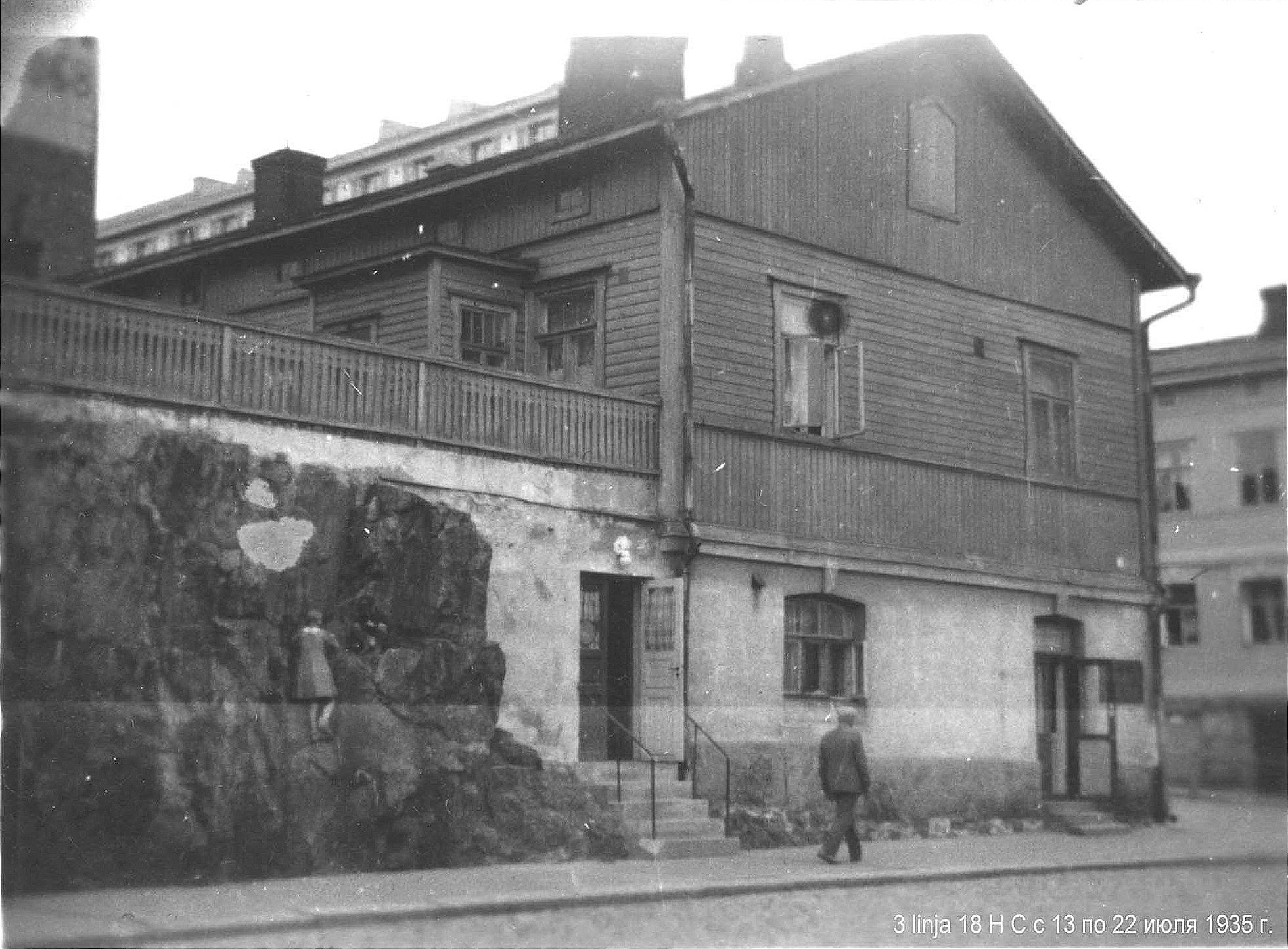
Former building used by the Saint Nikolaos parish, 1935.

In 1926, by petition of the Russian Orthodox community in Vyborg, under the guidance of Father Grigory Svetlovsky, the Vyborg Intercession Community and the Brotherhood of St. Nicholas in Helsinki, were formed. Father Grigory had advised the Helsinki parish to contact a Kronstadt refugee, Nikolai Shchukin, to serve as their parish priest.

The Brotherhood of St. Nicholas, today the St. Nikolaos Orthodox Parish, began the construction of its current parish building in 1938, with its consecration in December of that year.

=== After World War II ===
From 1931 to 1945 the Russian Orthodox Church in Finland was temporarily under the Ecumenical Patriarchate of Constantinople, as it was then under the jurisdiction of the Patriarchal Exarchate for Orthodox Parishes of Russian Tradition in Western Europe, headed by Eulogius Georgiyevsky, which in 1945 returned to communion with the Moscow Patriarchate.

In 1990, former President of Finland Mauno Koivisto granted Ingrian Finns permission to return to Finland, leading to a large influx of Russian-speaking people. As a result, the St. Nikolaos Orthodox Parish, which then had only 550 members, began growing at a rate of 150–200 members per year, reaching its recorded size of 3,700 in 2022.

== Present ==
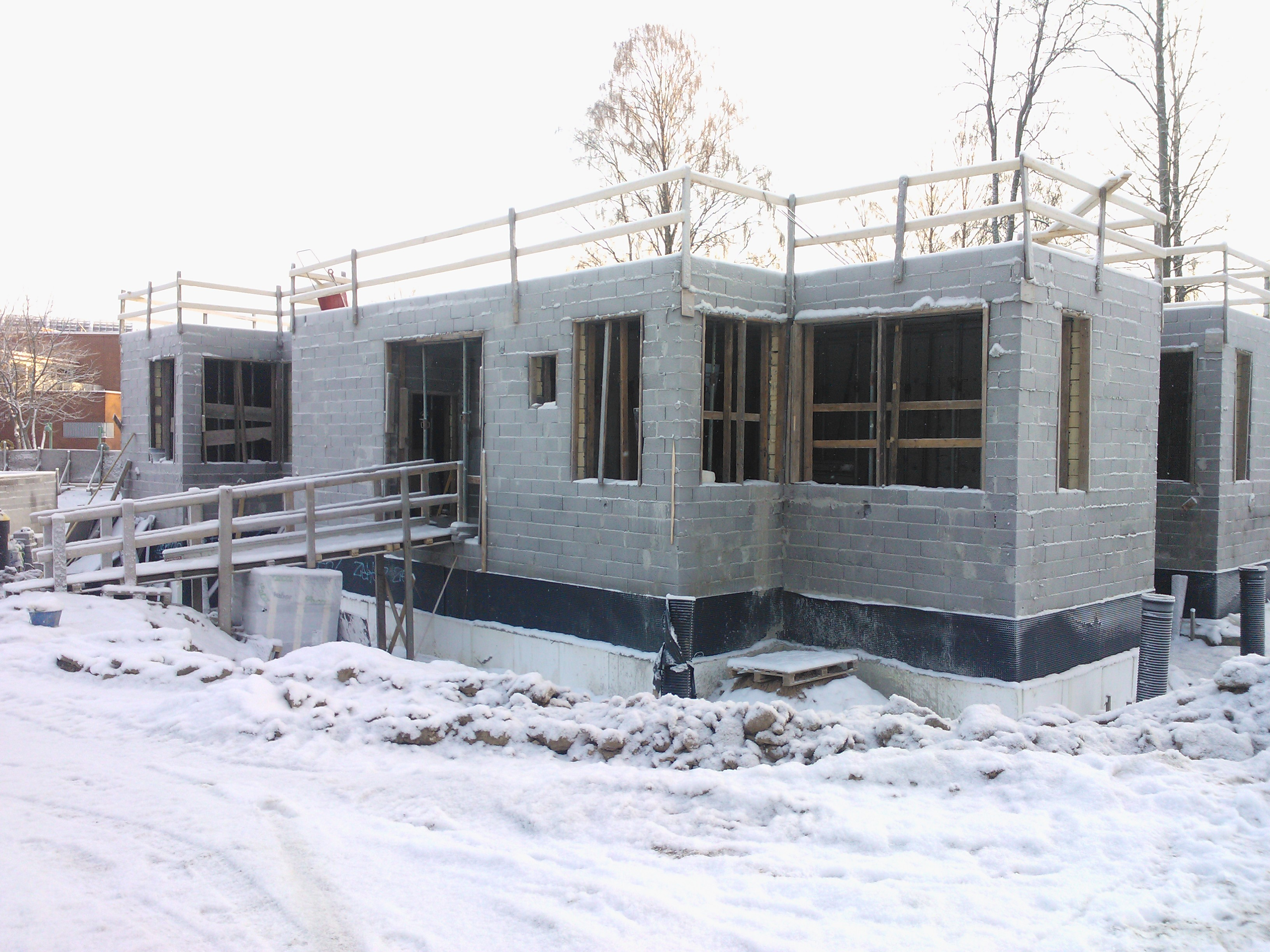
Construction of the planned parish complex in 2014 which has since halted.

In 2012, the St. Nikolaos Orthodox Parish began construction of a new church, as their existing parish church could no longer accommodate all their parishioners. However, work on the large church complex in Helsinki came to a definitive halt due to a lack of funding in 2015. In 2021, the city of Helsinki forbade any further attempts at construction, and as the cost of demolishing was too great for the parish, talks have begun regarding what to do with the land.

=== After 2022 ===
In 2023, the Russian Consulate General office in Turku was closed by the Finnish government, and the building was subsequently purchased by the city. The closure of the consulate was a response to Russia's decision to close the Finnish Consulate General in Saint Petersburg. As a result of this closure, the former Church of the Dormitition, subject to the same lease agreement, was also closed. It primarily served the Russian Orthodox faithful in Finland Proper.

Following the outbreak of the war in Ukraine, the Russian Orthodox Church in Finland has faced pressure to become independent from its mother church and to publicly condemn the actions of the Russian state as well as statements made by Patriarch Kirill. While the church has condemned the war, it maintains that it cannot sever ties with Moscow without violating canonical law, stating in March 2022 the following: “The ongoing war in Ukraine has caused great sadness and tension within our community. We are absolutely opposed to war; we stand for and pray for peace and mutual brotherly love.”

Finnish media outlets, such as YLE, HS, and Iltalehti, have accused Russian parishes of being indirectly under Russian state influence, a claim they have rejected, citing their self-governance and lack of dependency on Patriarch Kirill.

== Finance ==
According to Seura, the St. Nikolaos Orthodox Parish receives just under €30,000 annually, the majority of which is allocated to church maintenance, funeral services, and social work among Russian speakers. The parish maintains that such responsibilities should fall to the state rather than the parish, and that, unlike Finland’s national churches, it does not have the same taxation rights.

In 2024, the Orthodox Pokrova congregation received €2,451 in subsidies, whereas the St. Nikolaos Orthodox Parish received €26,142.

== Parishes ==
=== Saint Nikolaos Orthodox Parish ===
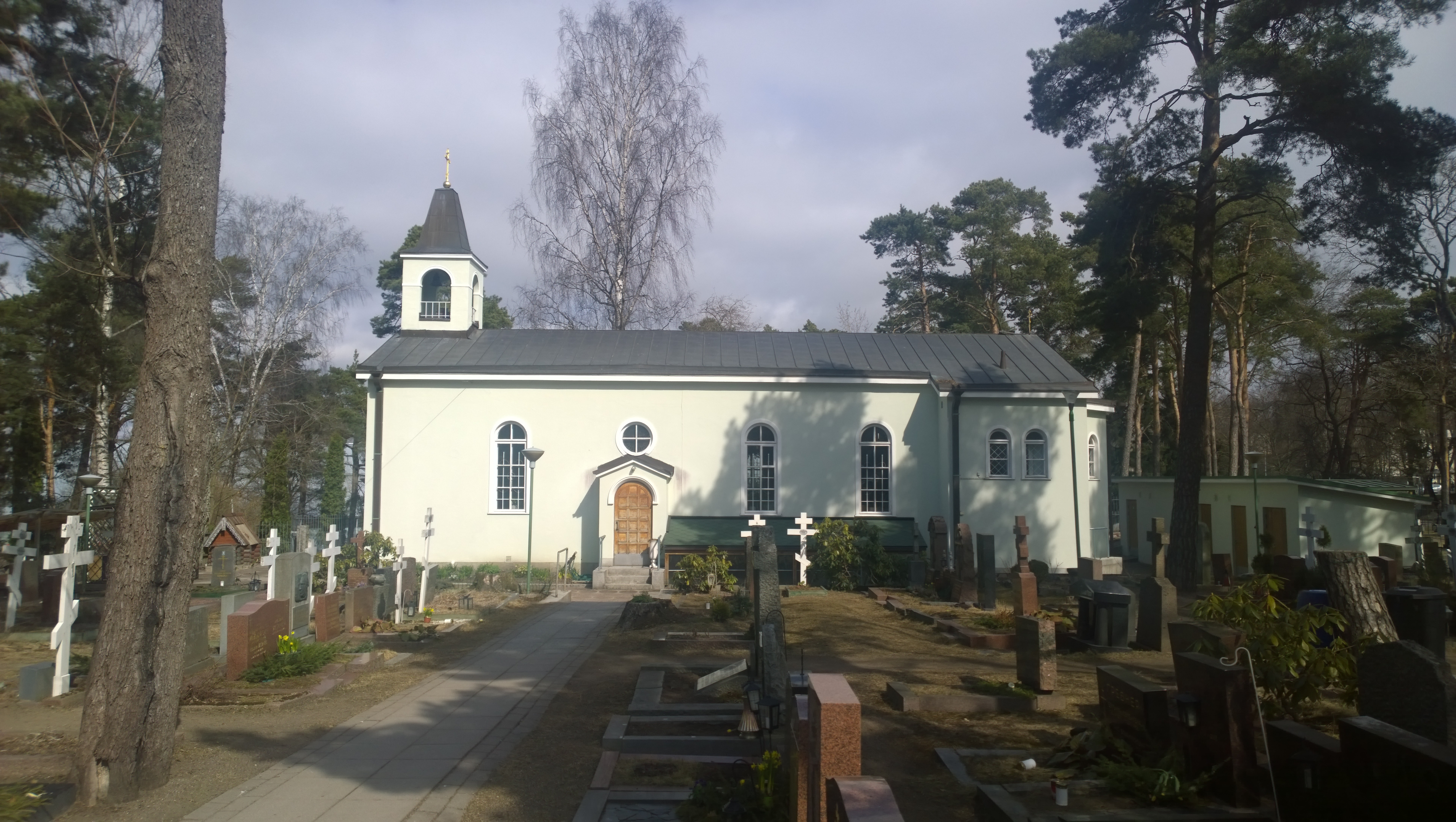
The parish church and cemetery in Helsinki. The cemetery is a former Russian military one.

The acting rector of St. Nikolaos Orthodox Parish is Archpriest Nikolai Voskoboinikov, supported by Priest Vladislav Menshikov. The parish also maintains a smaller secondary church, dedicated to Xenia of Saint Petersburg, under the care of Archpriest Orest Tschervinski. The parish maintains an active website where information about parish life may be found.

Despite being based in Helsinki, membership is open to people outside the city as well, provided they fill out any necessary paperwork.

According to its website, because the Russian Orthodox Church in Finland is unaffiliated with the Orthodox Church of Finland, it is not considered a national church, unlike the Orthodox Church of Finland or the Evangelical Lutheran Church. As a result, members registering cannot state that they are "Orthodox", as they would be assumed to belong to the Orthodox Church of Finland and would therefore be taxed incorrectly.

=== Orthodox Pokrova congregation ===
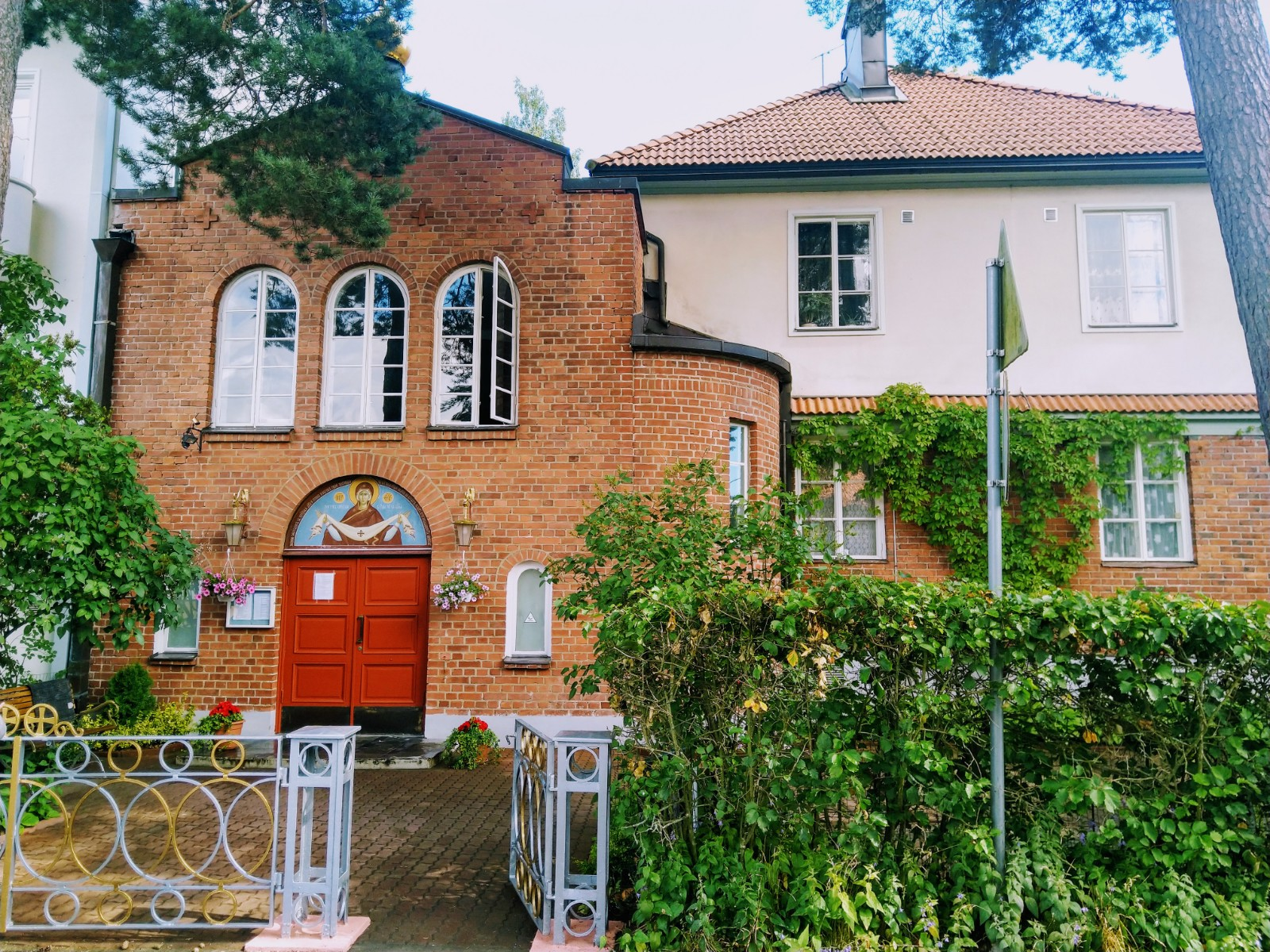
Parish church of the Orthodox Pokrova congregation in Helsinki.

Established in 1926 as the Yksityinen kreikkalais-katolinen kirkollinen yhdyskunta Viipurissa, relocated to Helsinki in 1940, it was renamed in 2004 to the Ortodoksinen Pokrovan seurakunta. The congregation is headed by Archpriest Viktor Lioutik, who is also the dean of the Russian Orthodox Church in Sweden. In 2022 the congregation had 371 members.

The former website Blagovest.fi served as a source of parish information, but after 2022 it ceased to be updated, and sometime after 2024 the site became defunct. Parish information is currently available via the congregation's Facebook and Instagram accounts under the name pokrovhelsinki.

== Churches ==
- Church of the Protection of the Theotokos, Munkkiniemi, Helsinki
- Church of Saint Nicholas, Hietaniemi, Helsinki
- Church of Xenia of Saint Petersburg, Mellunmäki, Helsinki
- Church of Our Lady of Kazan, Pori
- Church of St. Serafim of Sarov, Sastamala

== See also ==
- Religion in Finland
- Catholic Church in Finland
- Orthodox Church of Finland
- Russian Orthodox Church
