= Inna Latiševa =

Finnish-Russian business executive (born 1955)

Inna Latiševa (born 1955, Baku) is a Finnish-Russian business executive, who attracted the huge attention of the Finnish mass media with her book Ryssänä Suomessa (A guest from the wrong country). Latiševa moved to Finland from Leningrad in 1989 and worked as an export director and a CEO of Finnish and Swedish companies. In Leningrad she worked as a tour guide for the state owned travel agency, Intourist. Nowadays she lives in Barcelona.
