= Polvijärvi =

- Municipality
- Polvijärven kunta Polvijärvi kommun
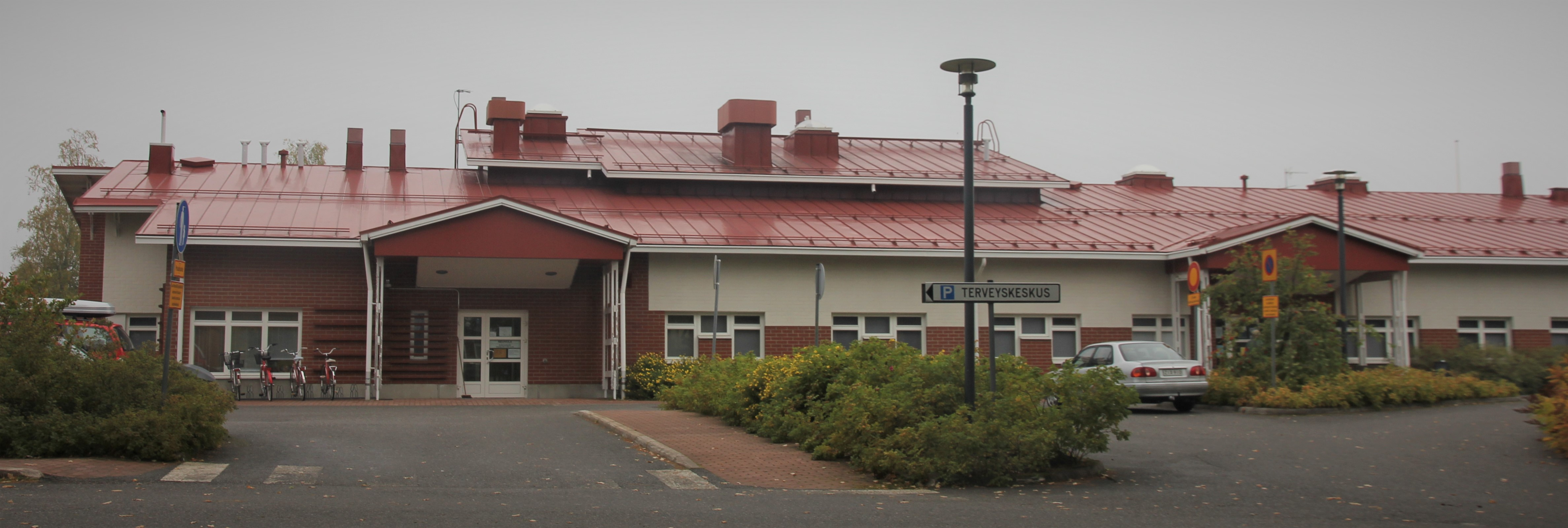
- Polvijärvi health centre

- Coat of arms

- Location of Polvijärvi in Finland
- Interactive map of Polvijärvi
- Coordinates: 62°51.3′N 029°22′E
- Country: Finland
- Region: North Karelia
- Sub-region: Joensuu
- Charter: 1876

Government
  - Municipal manager: Mervi Pääkkö

Area (2018-01-01)
  - Total: 958.32 km^{2} (370.01 sq mi)
  - Land: 804.63 km^{2} (310.67 sq mi)
  - Water: 154.22 km^{2} (59.54 sq mi)
  - Rank: 98th largest in Finland

Population (2025-12-31)
  - Total: 3,942
  - Rank: 192nd largest in Finland
  - Density: 4.9/km^{2} (13/sq mi)

Population by native language
  - Finnish: 98.3% (official)
  - Others: 1.7%

Population by age
  - 0 to 14: 13.3%
  - 15 to 64: 52.8%
  - 65 or older: 33.9%
- Time zone: UTC+02:00 (EET)
  - Summer (DST): UTC+03:00 (EEST)
- Website: www.polvijarvi.fi

Polvijärvi (Finnish pronunciation: [ˈpolʋiˌjærʋi]; literally "knee lake") is a municipality of Finland. It is located in the North Karelia region. The municipality has a population of 3,942 (31 December 2025) and covers an area of 958.32 square kilometres (370.01 sq mi) of which 154.22 km^{2} (59.54 sq mi) is water. The population density is 4.9 inhabitants per square kilometre (13/sq mi). Neighbouring municipalities are Juuka, Kaavi, Kontiolahti, and Liperi, Outokumpu.

The municipality is unilingually Finnish.

Polvijärvi is established in 1876.

== Geography ==
Polvijärvi is located in North Karelia. Joensuu is located 42 kilometers away and Joensuu airport is located 34 kilometres away.

Polvijärven Natura 2000 sites include Viklinrimpi, Sisuslahti in Höytiäinen Teerisaari, Saariniemi-Tervalahti and Hanhisuo.

== Notable people ==
- Heikki Soininen (1891–1957)
- Vilho Turunen (1923–1973)
- Jouni Kortelainen (born 1957)
- Annikka Mutanen (born 1965)
