= Pobeda, Leningrad Oblast =

Rural locality in Vyborgsky District, Russia

Coordinates: 60°21′N 29°25′E

Pobeda (Russian: Побе́да; Finnish: Kanneljärvi) is a rural locality on Karelian Isthmus, in Vyborgsky District of Leningrad Oblast, served by the station Kanneljärvi of the Saint Petersburg–Vyborg railroad. Until the Winter War and Continuation War, it had been the administrative center of the Kanneljärvi municipality of the Viipuri province of Finland.

The village of Kanneljärvi was first mentioned in 1553. The municipality of Kanneljärvi was established in 1925, comprising eight villages that had until then been part of the Uusikirkko municipality. Kanneljärvi was ceded to the Soviet Union in 1944 and its population was evacuated to the municipalities of Kiikala, Kisko, Kuusjoki, Muurla, Pertteli, Salo, Suomusjärvi and Uskela.

Historical population
Year	Pop.	±%
2007	1,863	—
2010	2354	—
2017	1,920	—
2021	1,928	+0.4%
