= Uskela =

- Former municipality
- Uskelan kunta
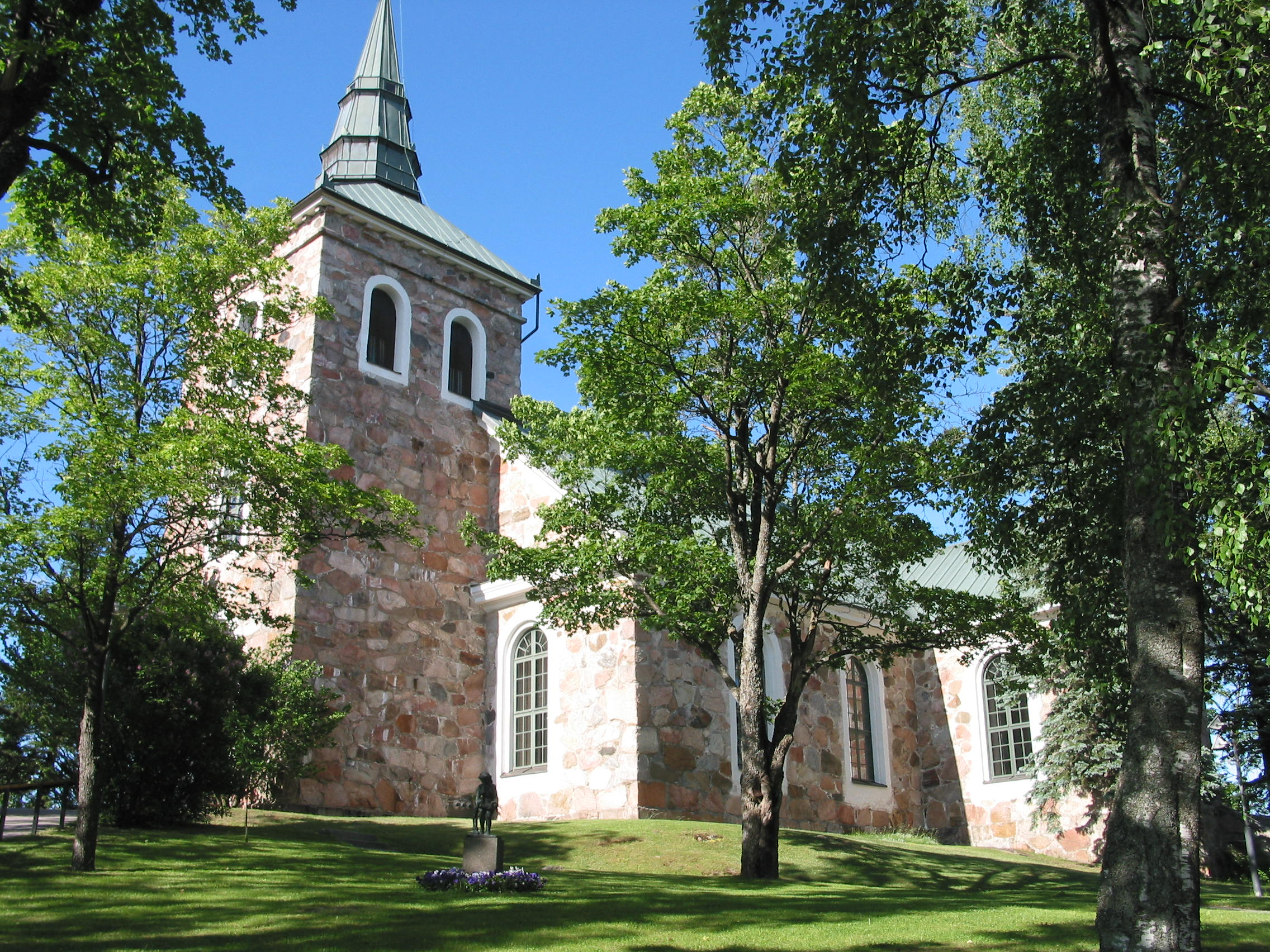
- Uskela Church.

- Coat of arms

- Location of Uskela in Finland
- Interactive map of Uskela
- Coordinates: 60°22′31″N 23°7′50″E
- Country: Finland
- Province: Turku and Pori Province
- Region: Finland Proper
- Established: 13th century
- Merged into Salo: 1967

Area
  - Land: 124.4 km^{2} (48.0 sq mi)

Population (1966-12-31)
  - Total: 3,105

Uskela is a former municipality of Finland.

It was merged into Salo in 1967. Many municipalities surrounding Uskela were split from it. In 1967 Uskela and part of Halikko were merged to the rapidly growing Salo which needed more area.

It bordered Salo, Halikko, Kuusjoki, Pertteli, Muurla and Perniö.

== History ==
Uskela is the oldest parish in eastern Finland Proper, having been established sometime in the 13th century. Halikko, Kiikala, Pertteli and Muurla were formerly parts of the parish.

In the 16th century, Uskela was administratively a part of Halikko, but remained a separate parish. Salo was originally an important village within the parish, but became an epäitsenäinen kauppala (a market town that was not a separate administrative unit) in 1887 and a municipality in 1891. More land from Uskela was transferred to Salo in 1932.

Uskela was consolidated with Salo in 1967.

== Church ==
Uskela Church (Uskelan kirkko) is the parish church for Uskela. The present church was completed in 1832. It replaced a parish church founded in the Middle Ages dating from approximately 1440. Uskela was the oldest congregation of its region; it was formed in the 12th century. The new church was designed by Carl Ludvig Engel in Empire style. It was built of stone and is one-nave long church.

== See also ==
- Uskelanjoki
