= Teijo =

Teijo may refer to:

== Places ==
=== Finland ===
- Teijo, Salo, a village in Salo
  - Teijo National Park, a national park in Salo

== People ==
- Teijo Eloranta (born 1960), Finnish actor and musician
- Teijo Finneman (born 1944), Finnish basketball player
- Teijo Khan (1956–2020), American professional wrestler
- Teijo Kööpikkä (born 1980), Finnish para-athlete
- Teijo Nakamura (1900–1988), Japanese haiku poet
