= Kankareenjärvi =

Small lake in Finland

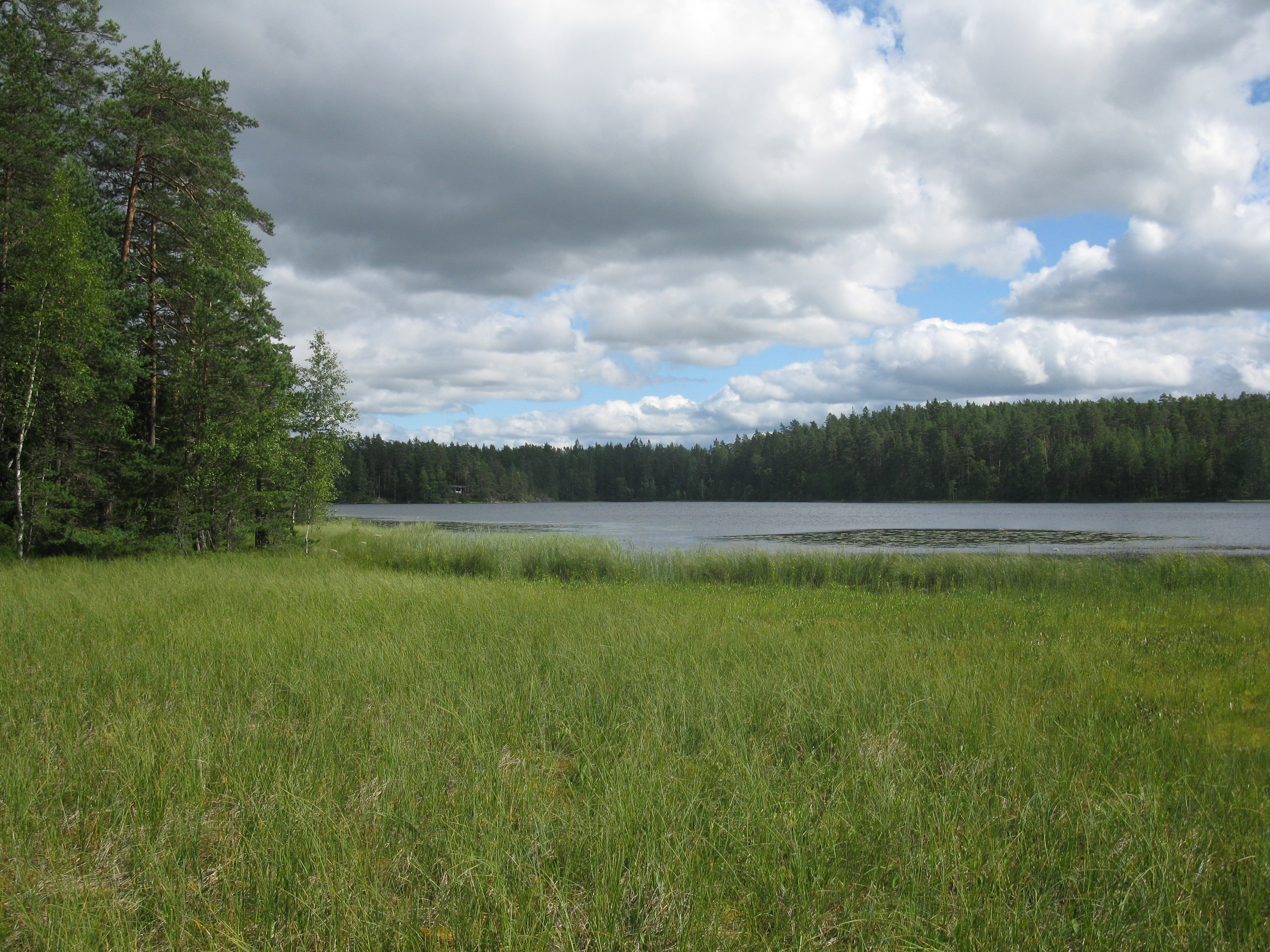

- Location within Finland
- Coordinates: 60°26′28″N 22°57′40″E
- Primary outflows: Purilanjoki
- Basin countries: Finland
- Surface area: 11 ha (27 acres)
- Shore length^{1}: 1.53 km (0.95 mi)
- Surface elevation: 77.7 m (255 ft)
- Frozen: December–April
- ^{1} Shore length is not a well-defined measure.

Kankareenjärvi is a small lake in Finland. It is situated in Salo in the region of Southwest Finland in the area of the former municipality of Halikko. Purilanjoki, a minor river that discharges into the Archipelago Sea, originates from the lake.

Kankareenjärvi is the only lake of Halikko. A pine forest surrounds the lake. The shores of the Kankareenjärvi are partly bog, especially in the north side of the lake. There are some summer cottages and a public beach at the lake.

== See also ==
- List of lakes in Finland
