= Uskelanjoki =

River in Finland

Coordinates: 60°21′N 023°06′E

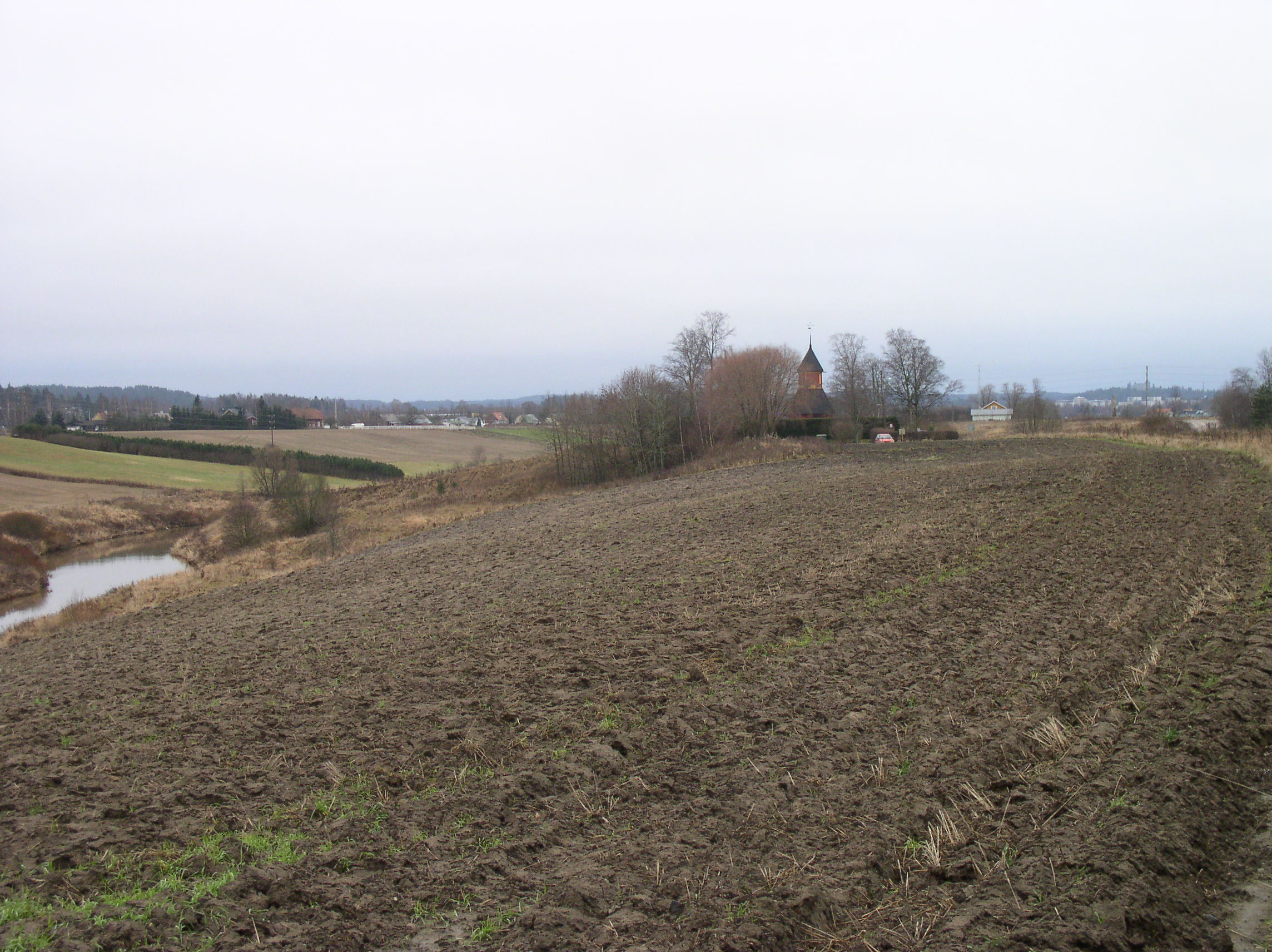
Uskelanjoki at the site of the 1825 landslide that destroyed the church of Uskela.

Uskelanjoki is a river of Finland. It flows into the Archipelago Sea through the town of Salo. The course of the river follows a large, NE–SW oriented bedrock fracture line which begins from the river estuary in Halikonlahti bay and goes up through the lower reaches of the river and its tributary Terttilänjoki in north. Other tributaries of Uskelanjoki are Rekijoki and Hitolanjoki in north, Kurajoki in Pertteli and Vähäjoki near Salo. Landslides are common in the area, and for example in 1825 the church of Uskela that stood on the edge of the river was destroyed by a landslide that occurred on Christmas Eve.

== See also ==
- List of rivers of Finland

== Sources ==
- Aartolahti, Toive: The morphology and development of the river valleys in Southwestern Finland, pp. 8–9. Annales Academiae Scientiarum Fennicae. Series A. III. Geologica–Geographica 116. Helsinki: Suomalainen tiedeakatemia 1975.
- Topelius, Zacharias: ”Maanvieremiä Uskelassa”, Maamme kirja. 38. edition. Porvoo: WSOY, 1934. (in Finnish)
