= Gustaf Renvall =

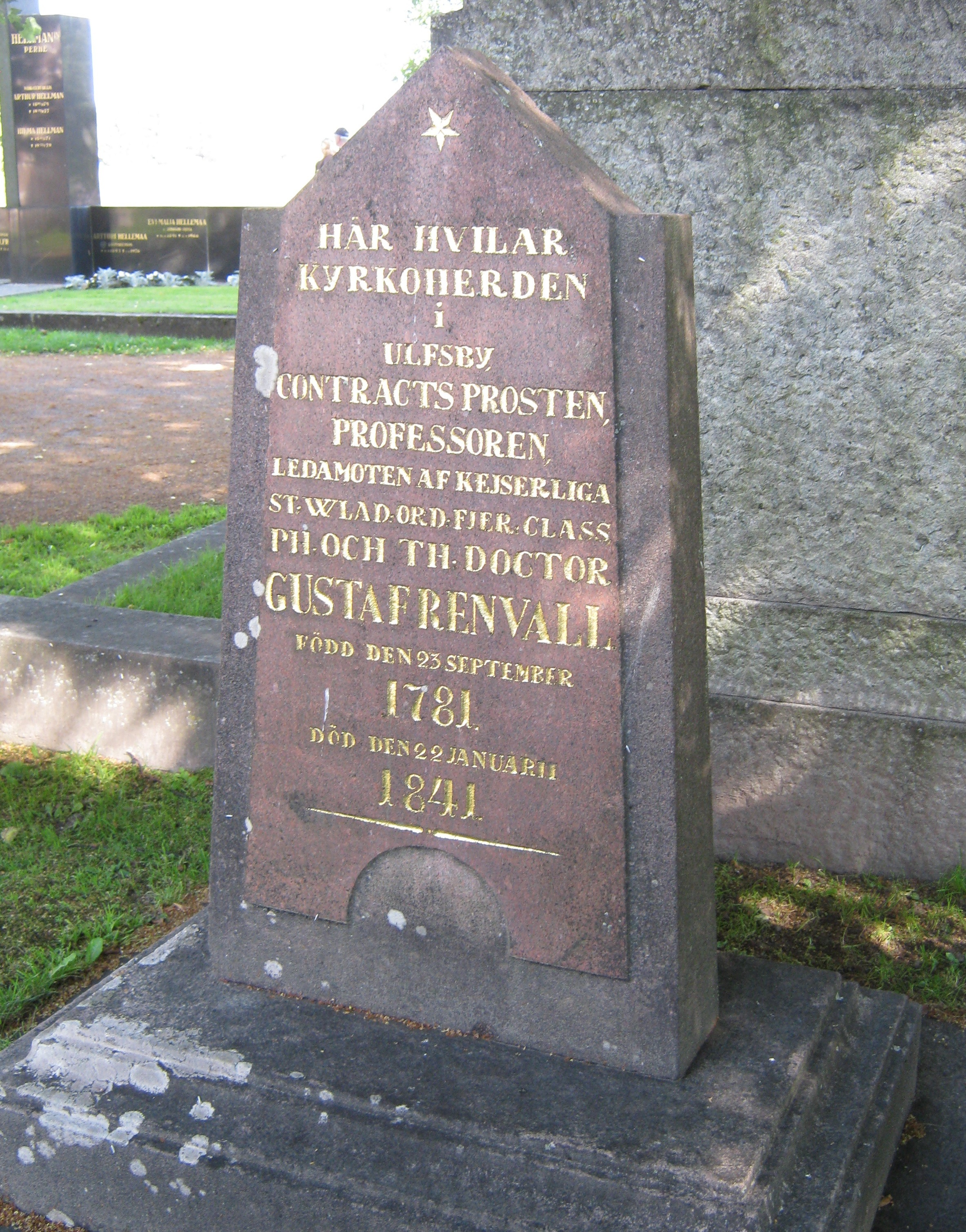
Grave Gustaf Renvall at the cemetery of St. Olof's Church, Ulvila Finland

Gustaf Renvall (23 September 1781 – 22 January 1841) was a Finnish clergyman, educator and philologist.

Gustaf Renvall was born in Halikko, Finland. He became a student at the Royal Academy of Turku (now University of Helsinki) in 1801 and received his Master of Arts in 1810. He was ordained as a Lutheran priest in 1806. Renvall started as a docent of Finnish at the Academy of Turku and later was named assistant professor of education. In 1819, he became a clergyman in Uskela and vicar in 1829. He received the title of professor in 1827 and in 1830 received an honorary doctorate in theology.

Among Renvall's most important works was a dictionary which for more than three decades was the main source of scholarly knowledge of the Finnish language. He died in January 1841 shortly after the completion of his grammar which would establish the western dialects as the principal Finnish literary language. He was buried at St. Olaf's Church, Ulvila.

== Noted works ==
- De orthoëpia et orthographia linguae fenniae (1810) - Finnish Dictionary
- Suomalainen Sana-Kirja (1826) - Finnish Lexicon
- Finsk språklära (1840) - Finnish Grammar

== See also ==
- Elias Lönnrot
