= Äijälä =

Äijälä is a Finnish surname. Notable people with the surname include:

- Ilari Äijälä (born 1986), Finnish footballer
- Jussi Äijälä (born 1988), Finnish footballer
- Läjä Äijälä (born 1958), Finnish musician, comics artist and poet

== See also ==
- Aijala, a village in Salo, Finland
