= Kitula =

Village in Salo, Finland

Coordinates: 60°22.1819′N 23°35.4283′E

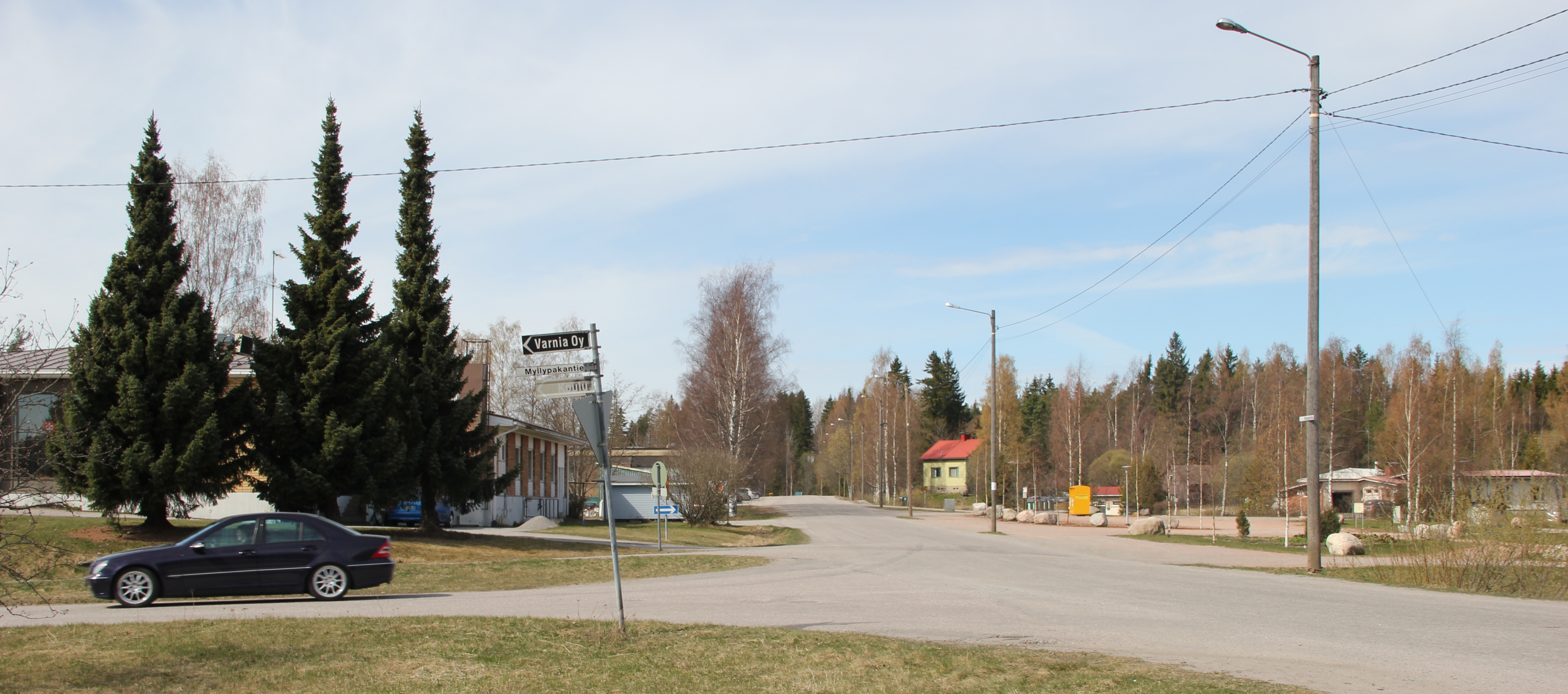
Kitula

Kitula (Finnish pronunciation: [ˈkit̪ulɑ]; literally translated the "place of linger") is a village in Suomusjärvi, Salo, in Southwest Finland, along regional road 110 (Old Turku Road). It is the administrative center of the former municipality of Suomusjärvi, where local services such as a grocery store, a hardware store, a library, a primary school, a sports field and a refrigeration station for fuel distribution are located. Most of the services are between Urheilutie and Helsingintie (regional road 110).

Kitula is the most significant village in Suomusjärvi in terms of population, but over time it has experienced a reduction in services after the completion of the Turku motorway and the transfer of the largest amount of traffic there, thus bypassing Kitula. In 2018, more than 600 inhabitants lived in Kitula.

It is 92 kilometres (57 mi) from Kitula along the regional road to Helsinki and 87 kilometres (54 mi) to Turku. Suomusjärvi Church is less than ten kilometers from Kitula and 26 kilometres (16 mi) from the nearest city center, Salo. The E18 motorway runs north of Suomusjärvi. Over ten kilometers along the regional road in the direction of Helsinki is Lake Lahnajärvi.

== See also ==
- Lahnajärvi – village in Suomusjärvi, Salo
