= Lake Lahnajärvi =

Lake in Southwest Finland, Finland

Lahnajärvi
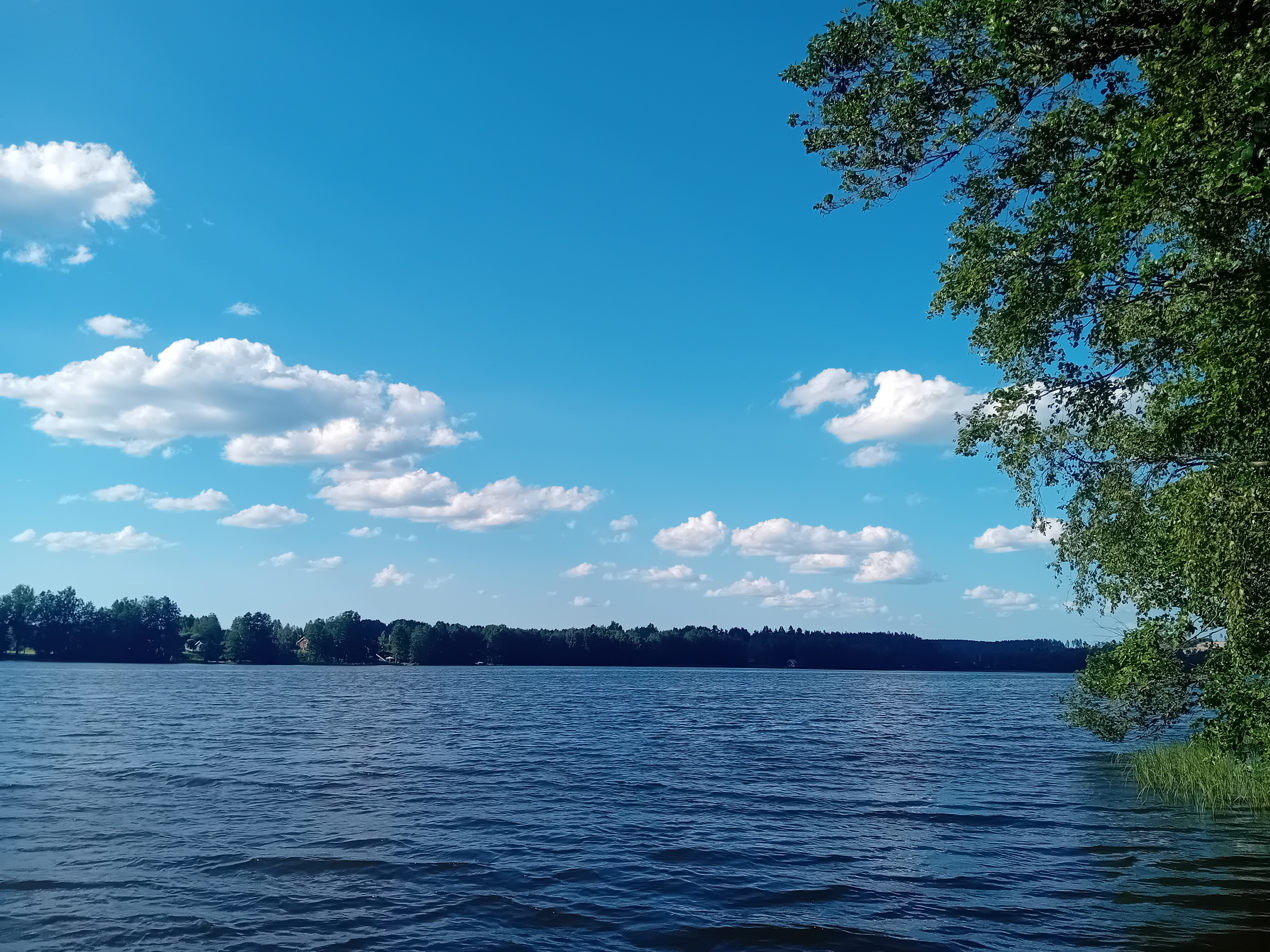
- Lake Lahnajärvi

- Location within Finland
- Location: Lahnajärvi, Salo, Finland
- Coordinates: 60°22′36″N 23°42′15″E
- Basin countries: Finland
- Surface area: 0.769 km^{2} (0.297 sq mi)
- Average depth: 7.4 m (24 ft)
- Shore length^{1}: 4.99 km (3.10 mi)
- Surface elevation: 65 m (213 ft)
- ^{1} Shore length is not a well-defined measure.

Lahnajärvi (Finnish pronunciation: [ˈlɑhnɑˌjærʋi]; lit. 'bream lake') is a lake in Finland. It is situated in Salo in the region of Southwest Finland in the area of the former municipality of Suomusjärvi next to the village of the same name. The lake is part of the Kiskonjoki–Perniönjoki Basin.

Since the lake is located along the current regional road 110 (at time Highway 1), Finland's first rest area called Lahnajärven taukopaikka was established by the road near the lake in the 1950s, which included a café, restaurant and petrol station, and where express buses also stopped. The Lahnajärvi rest area was in operation, but was closed when the new motorway was completed in 2008 and was closed until the autumn of 2015, when it reopened. In the 1980s, a water park was also established near the rest area, but this was short-lived.

== See also ==
- List of lakes in Finland
