= Renvall =

Renvall is a surname, borne by a Finnish family of scientists and artists. Notable members of the family include:

- Gustaf Renvall (1781–1841), linguist
- Torsten Thure Renvall (1884–1898), Archibischop of Turku
- Heikki Renvall, fennoman, husband of Aino Ackté
