= Teijo National Park =

National park in Finland

- IUCN category II (national park)
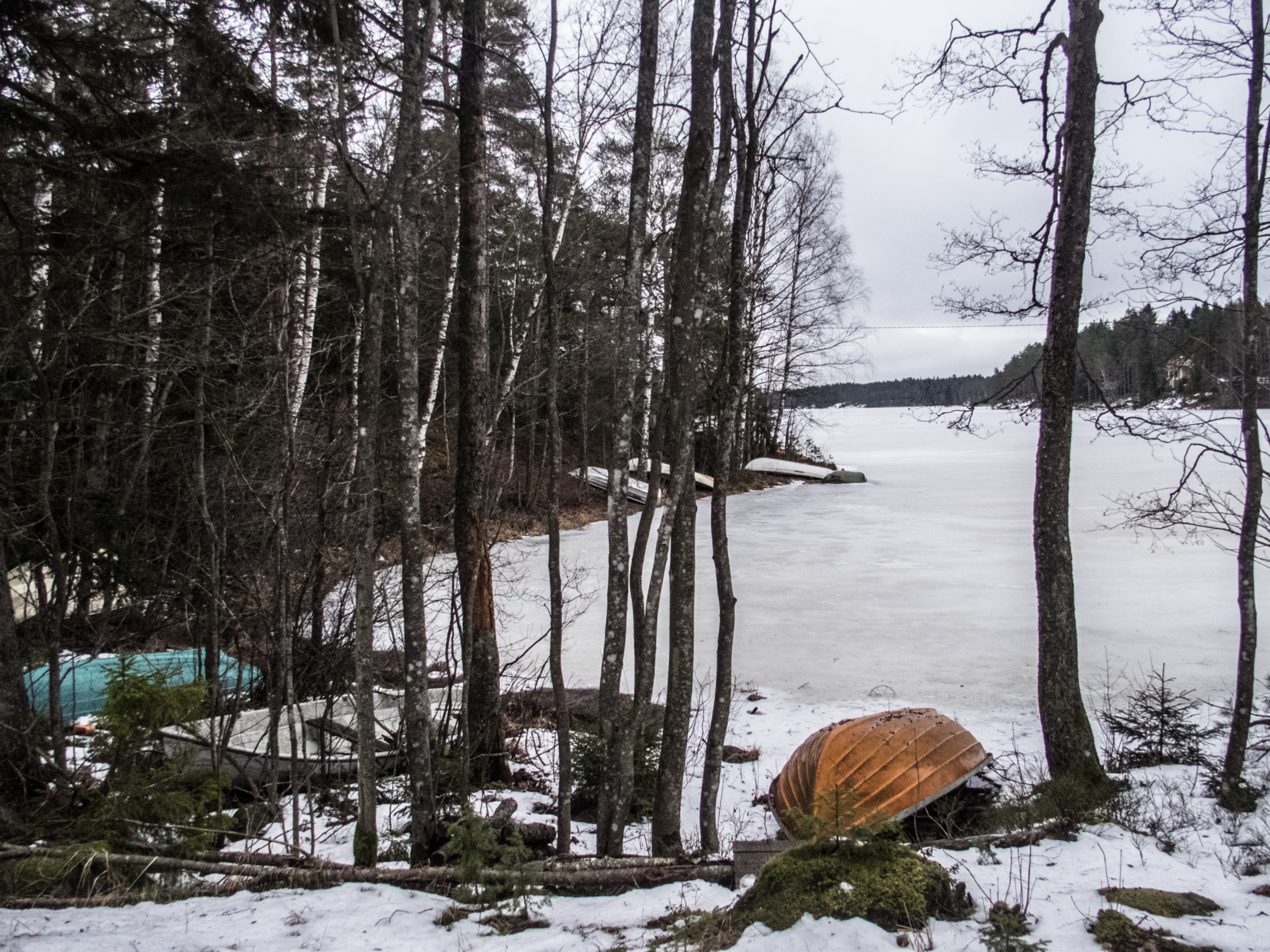

- Location within Finland
- Location: Southwest Finland, Finland
- Coordinates: 60°13′26″N 022°57′37″E
- Area: 34 km^{2} (13 sq mi)
- Established: 2015
- Visitors: 92,100 (in 2024)
- Governing body: Metsähallitus
- Website: https://www.luontoon.fi/en/destinations/teijo-national-park

Teijo National Park (Finnish: Teijon kansallispuisto, Swedish: Tykö nationalpark) is a national park in Southwest Finland, Finland in the Perniö area of Salo municipality. The park was established on January 1, 2015, and covers an area of 34 square kilometres (13 sq mi). It is maintained by Metsähallitus.

In the National Park, there is one eutrophic fen, which is a type of mire that has almost disappeared in southern Finland. The forests are mainly young managed pine forests. The park is also home for several species of freshwater fish, nesting birds including goose, cranes, sandpipers and grouse; and mammals such as moose and deer.

There are approximately 50 kilometres (31 mi) of marked trails in the park, including 3 kilometres (1.9 mi) of trails for physically disabled persons.

Included in the national park are historical industrial areas, including a former iron works area in Kirjakkala. The iron works contain many log houses from the 1800s which have been renovated to their original state.

== See also ==
- List of national parks of Finland
- Protected areas of Finland
- Teijo, Salo
