= Saukkola =

- District of Lohja
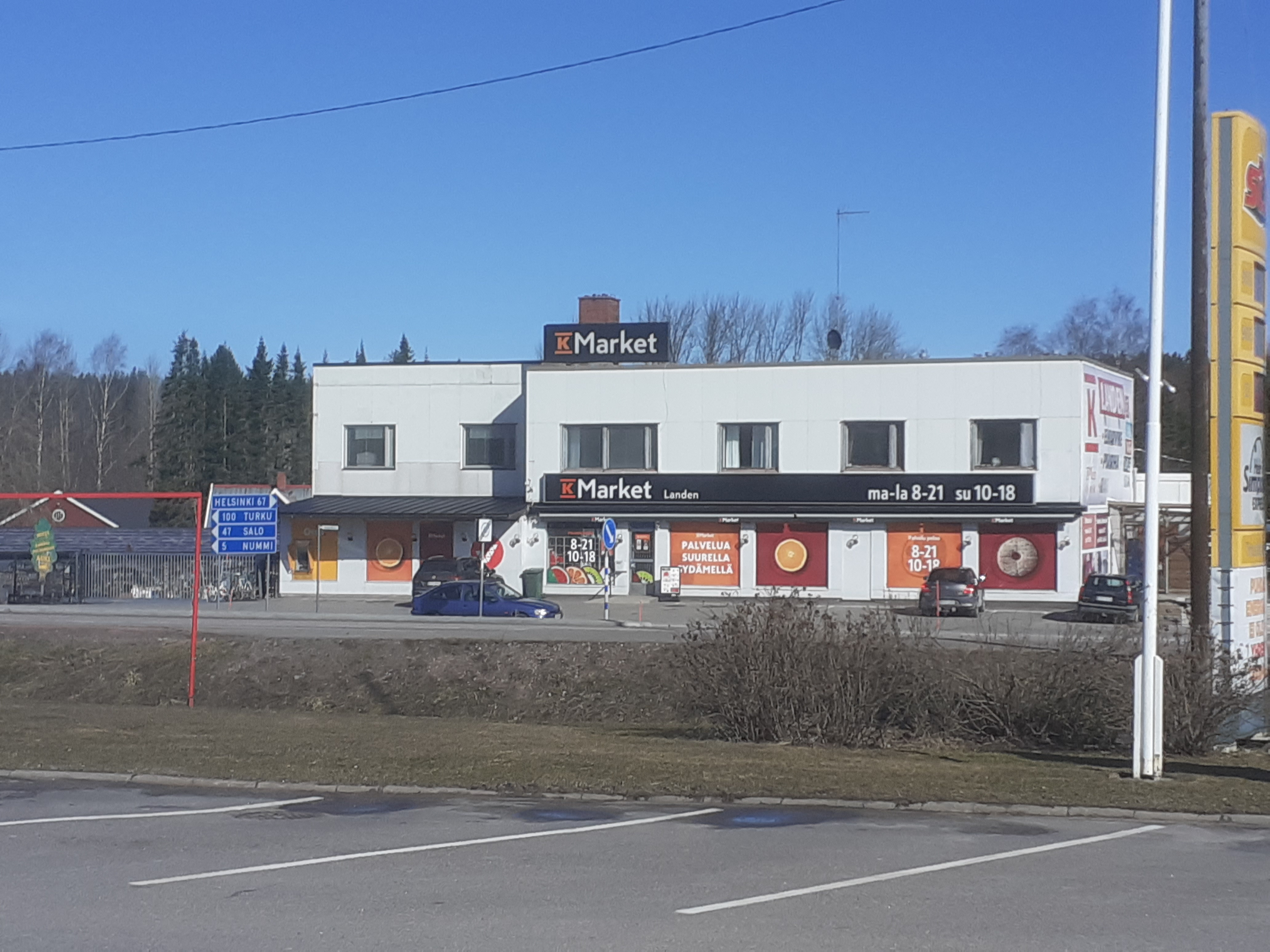
- K-Market store along the regional road 110 in Saukkola.
- Interactive map of Saukkola
- Coordinates: 60°22.88′N 23°58.17′E
- Country: Finland
- Region: Uusimaa
- Sub-region: Greater Helsinki (formerly Lohja sub-region)
- City: Lohja
- Main District: Nummi-Pusula
- Inner District(s): Saukkola

Area
  - Total: 5.27 km^{2} (2.03 sq mi)

Population (12-31-2029)
  - Total: 1,069
  - Density: 196.2/km^{2} (508/sq mi)

Saukkola (Finnish: [ˈsɑu̯kːolɑ]) is an urban area and district in the city of Lohja and the former administrative centre of the Nummi-Pusula municipality. Old Turku Road between Turku and Helsinki (regional road 110) crosses through the area. Saukkola has a population of 1,034 inhabitants and is the second largest urban settlement in Lohja after the central urban area.

Saukkola village is considered to have been born around 1540, when there were three houses in the village. The name Saukkola (literally means the "place of otter") may have come from the owner of the first house in the village, whose name was again due to, for example, the hunting industry; otters, to which the name of the village refers, were also caught in the local region.

Saukkola has an industrial area in the middle of settlements, a filling station and many shops on the Nummi-Pusula scale. There is the Landen supermarket, a library, a kindergarten, a home appliance store, a bank, a pharmacy, two hardware stores, two barber saloons, a gym with guided exercise and a dentist. The nearest schools are next to the village of Nummi. Since 1997, the fire station of the volunteer fire department also operates in Saukkola. A new Sale grocery store was opened in Saukkola on 30 April 2022.

In his final years, Saukkola was home to Leo Fabritius, who, before his death in 2005, was the last Finnish citizen to survive the Spanish Civil War (1936–1939) on the Republic's side.

== See also ==
- Lahnajärvi – village in Suomusjärvi, Salo
- Pusula – village in Nummi-Pusula, Lohja
- Virkkala – neighborhood in Lohja
