= Treasure of Halikko =

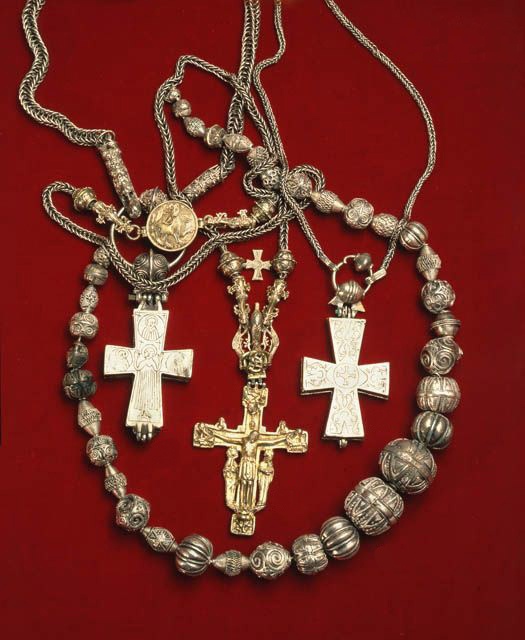
The treasure of Halikko.

Treasure of Halikko (Finnish: Halikon aarre) is the most valuable treasure found in Finland and one of the most notable treasures in the Nordic countries. It was found in 1887 from Halikko and it is dated to the 11–12th century. The treasure includes three heavy silver crosses. The necklace with beads was gilded. The cross with golden embossments is probably from Central Europe, while the other two are thought to have been from other Nordic countries. The necklace is most likely from the southern parts of the Baltic Sea or from the Byzantine Empire.
