= Perniö =

Perniö Perniö – Bjärnå
- Former municipality
- Perniön kunta Bjärnå kommun
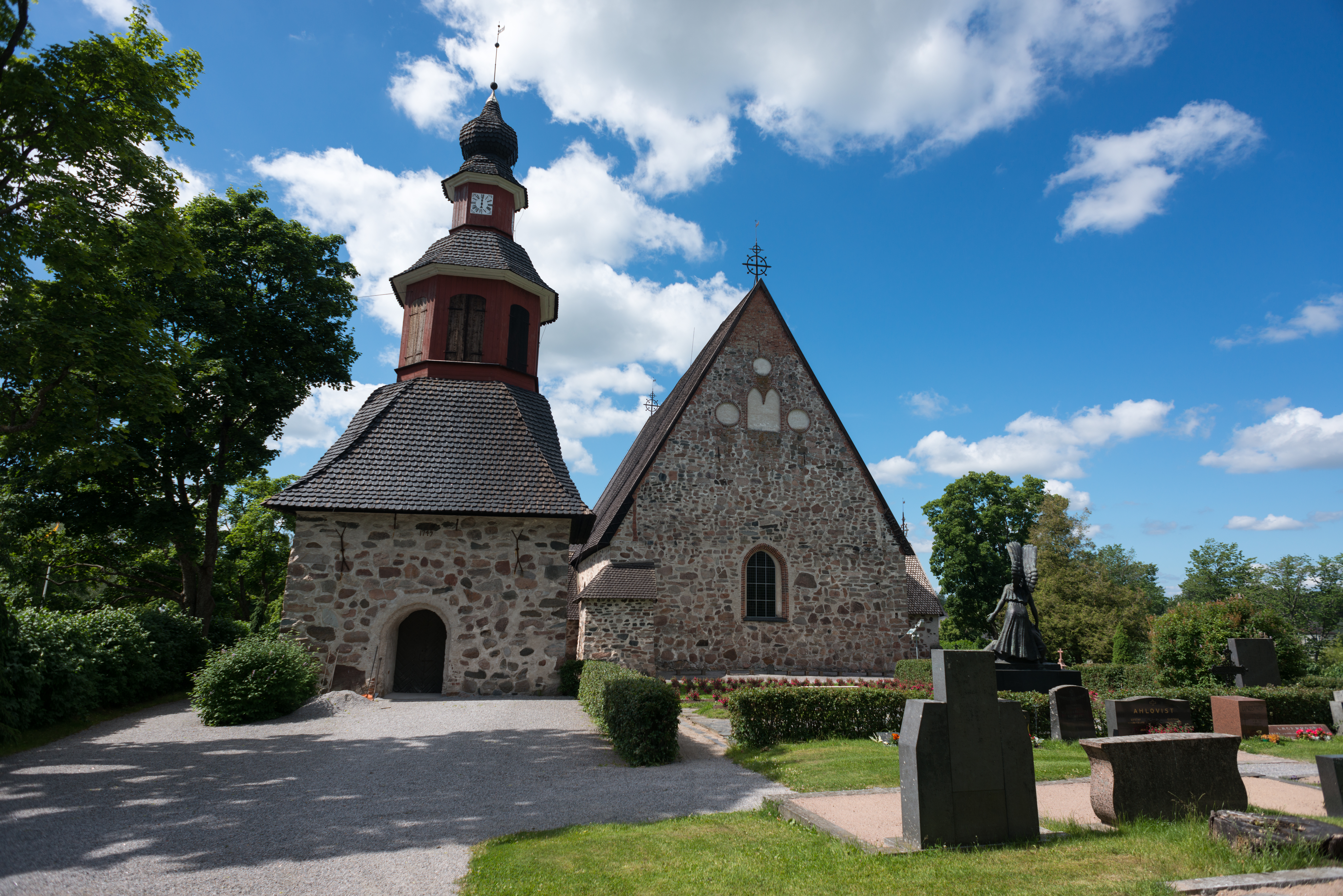
- Perniö church

- Coat of arms

- Interactive map of Perniö
- Location within Southwest Finland Location within Finland Location within Europe
- Country: Finland
- Province: Western Finland
- Region: Southwest Finland
- Sub-region: Salo
- Merged with Salo: January 1, 2009

Government
  - City manager: Pentti Vanhatalo

Area
  - Total: 407.79 km^{2} (157.45 sq mi)
  - Land: 397.88 km^{2} (153.62 sq mi)
  - Water: 9.91 km^{2} (3.83 sq mi)
  - Rank: 235th

Population (2003)
  - Total: 6,023
  - Rank: 177th
  - Density: 15.14/km^{2} (39.21/sq mi)
- −0.5% change
- Time zone: UTC+2 (EET)
  - Summer (DST): UTC+3 (EEST)
- Official languages: Finnish
- Urbanisation: 52.8%
- Unemployment rate: 8.9%
- Climate: Dfb
- Website: http://www.pernio.fi/

Perniö (Finnish pronunciation: [ˈperniø]; Swedish: Bjärnå) is a former municipality of Finland. It was consolidated with Salo on January 1, 2009. Neighbouring municipalities of Perniö were Ekenäs (formerly Tenala), Halikko, Kimito, Kisko, Muurla, Salo and Särkisalo.

It is located in the province of Western Finland and is part of the Southwest Finland region. The municipality had a population of 6,026 (2004-12-31) and covered an area of 407.79 km² (excluding sea) of which 9.91 km² is inland water. The population density was 15.15 inhabitants per km².

The municipality was unilingually Finnish.

== See also ==
- Teijo, Salo
