= Finnish regional road 110 =

Road in Finland

Regional Road 110
- Yhdystie 110 (Finnish); Förbindelseväg 110 (Swedish)
- Turku Road: Turuntie; Åbosvägen
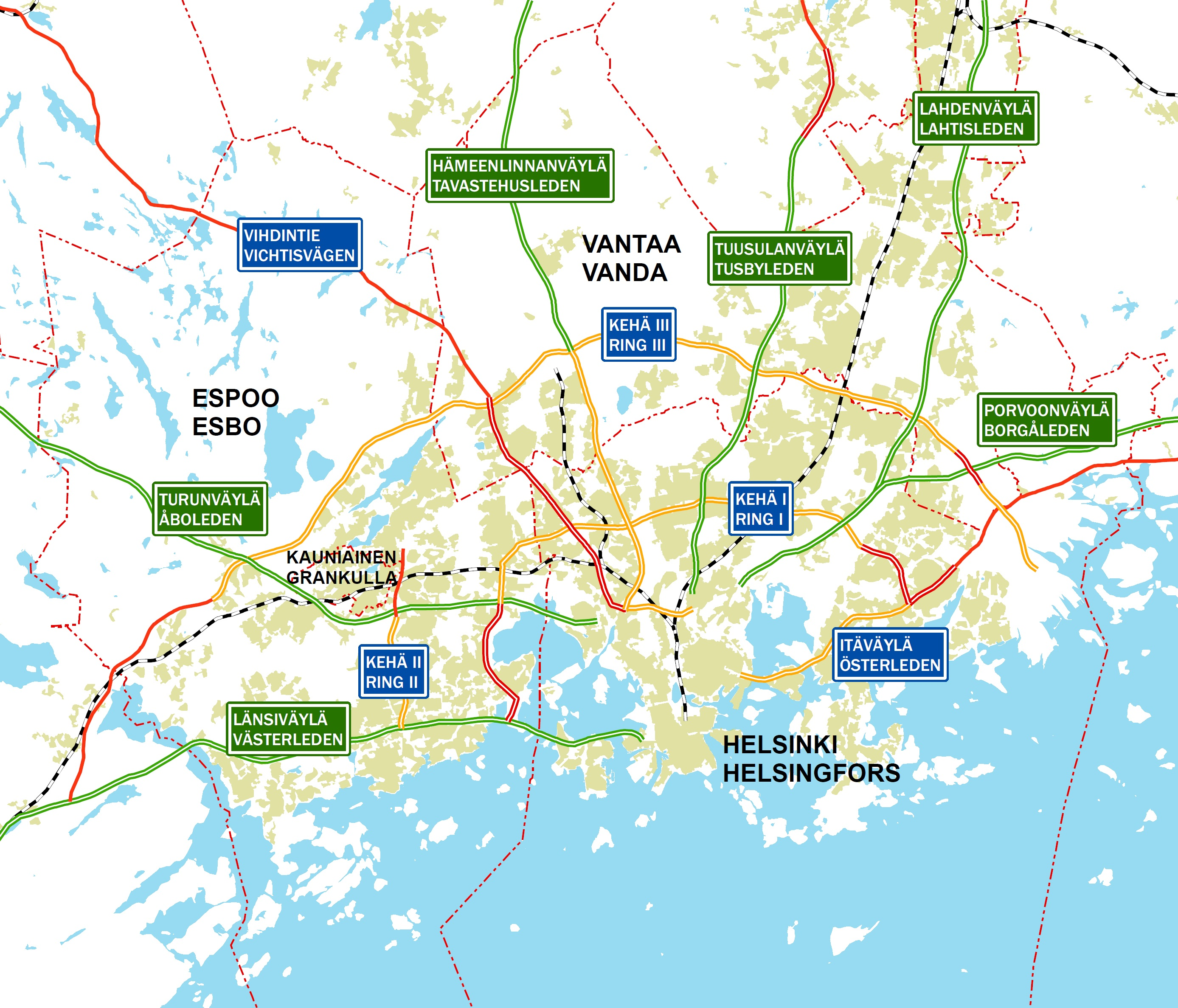

Route information
- Length: 160 km (99 mi)

Major junctions
- From: Helsinki
- To: Turku

Location
- Country: Finland

Highway system
- Highways in Finland

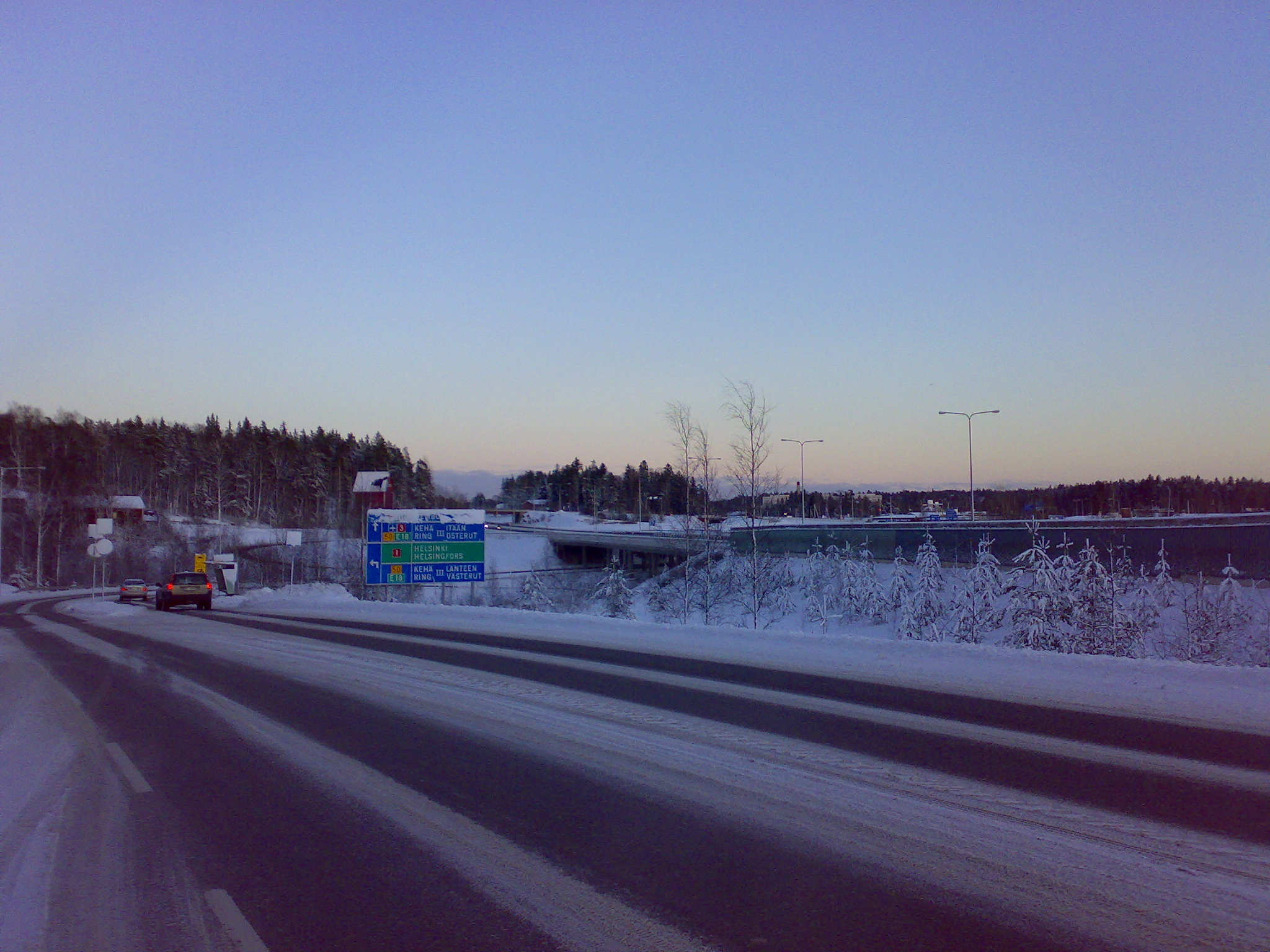
Seututie 110 at the Ring Road III junction in Espoo.

Finnish regional road 110 (Finnish: Seututie 110, Swedish: Regionalväg 110), or Turku Road (Finnish: Turuntie, Swedish: Åbosvägen), is the leading regional road from Helsinki to Turku. The road is a parallel to the former Highway 1 and the current Highway 1 (E18).

Regional road 110 actually starts at the Haaga roundabout. In it, it differs from regional road 120, or Vihdintie, which again starts at the northern end of Mannerheimintie. The road runs from Helsinki through Veikkola to Saukkola and Nummenkylä in Lohja and from there through Salo's Lahnajärvi and Kitula, Muurla and the center of Salo to Kupittaa in Turku. The alignment of the road partly follows the old king's road.

== See also ==
- Somerontie
