= Kiikala =

- Former municipality
- Kiikalan kunta Kiikala kommun
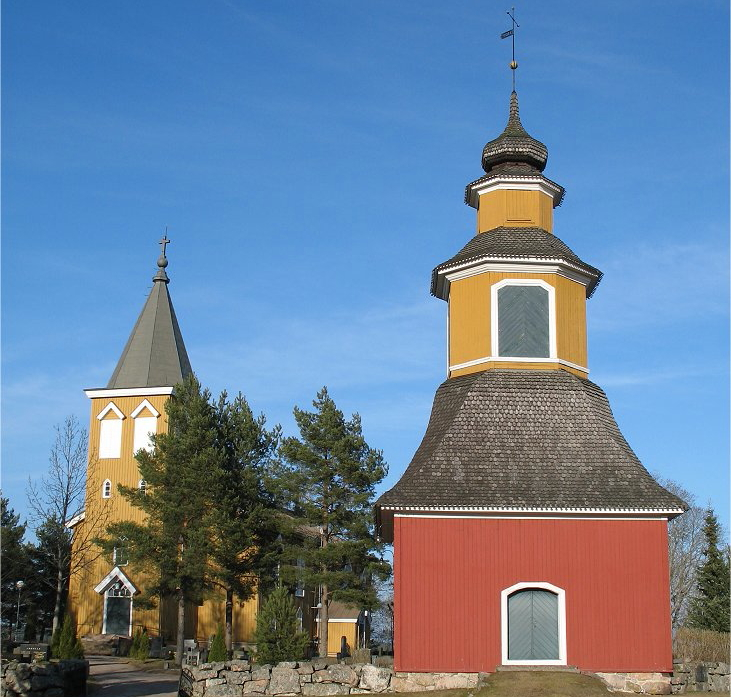
- Kiikala Church with bell tower in 2009.

- Coat of arms
- Motto(s): Kotoinen Kiikala, kauneinta Suomea ("Homely Kiikala, the most beautiful place in Finland")
- Interactive map of Kiikala
- Location within Southwest Finland Location within Finland Location within Europe
- Country: Finland
- Province: Western Finland
- Region: Southwest Finland
- Sub-region: Salo
- Merged into Salo: January 1, 2009

Government
  - City manager: Seppo Koskinen

Area
  - Total: 245.35 km^{2} (94.73 sq mi)
  - Land: 240.12 km^{2} (92.71 sq mi)
  - Water: 5.23 km^{2} (2.02 sq mi)
  - Rank: 312th

Population (2003)
  - Total: 1,875
  - Rank: 359th
  - Density: 7.809/km^{2} (20.22/sq mi)
- +0.8 % change
- Time zone: UTC+2 (EET)
  - Summer (DST): UTC+3 (EEST)
- Official languages: Finnish
- Urbanisation: 19.7%
- Unemployment rate: 10.0%
- Website: www.kiikala.fi

Kiikala (Finnish pronunciation: [ˈkiːkɑlɑ]) is a former municipality of Finland. It was consolidated with Salo on January 1, 2009. Neighbouring municipalities of Kiikala were Kisko, Kuusjoki, Nummi-Pusula, Pertteli, Somero and Suomusjärvi.

It is located in the province of Western Finland and is part of the Southwest Finland region. The municipality had a population of 1,872 (2004-12-31) and covered an area of 245.35 km^{2} of which 5.23 km² is water. The population density was 7.80 inhabitants per km².

The municipality was unilingually Finnish.

== See also ==
- Somero
- Suomusjärvi
