= Lahnajärvi =

Village in Southwest Finland, Finland

- Village
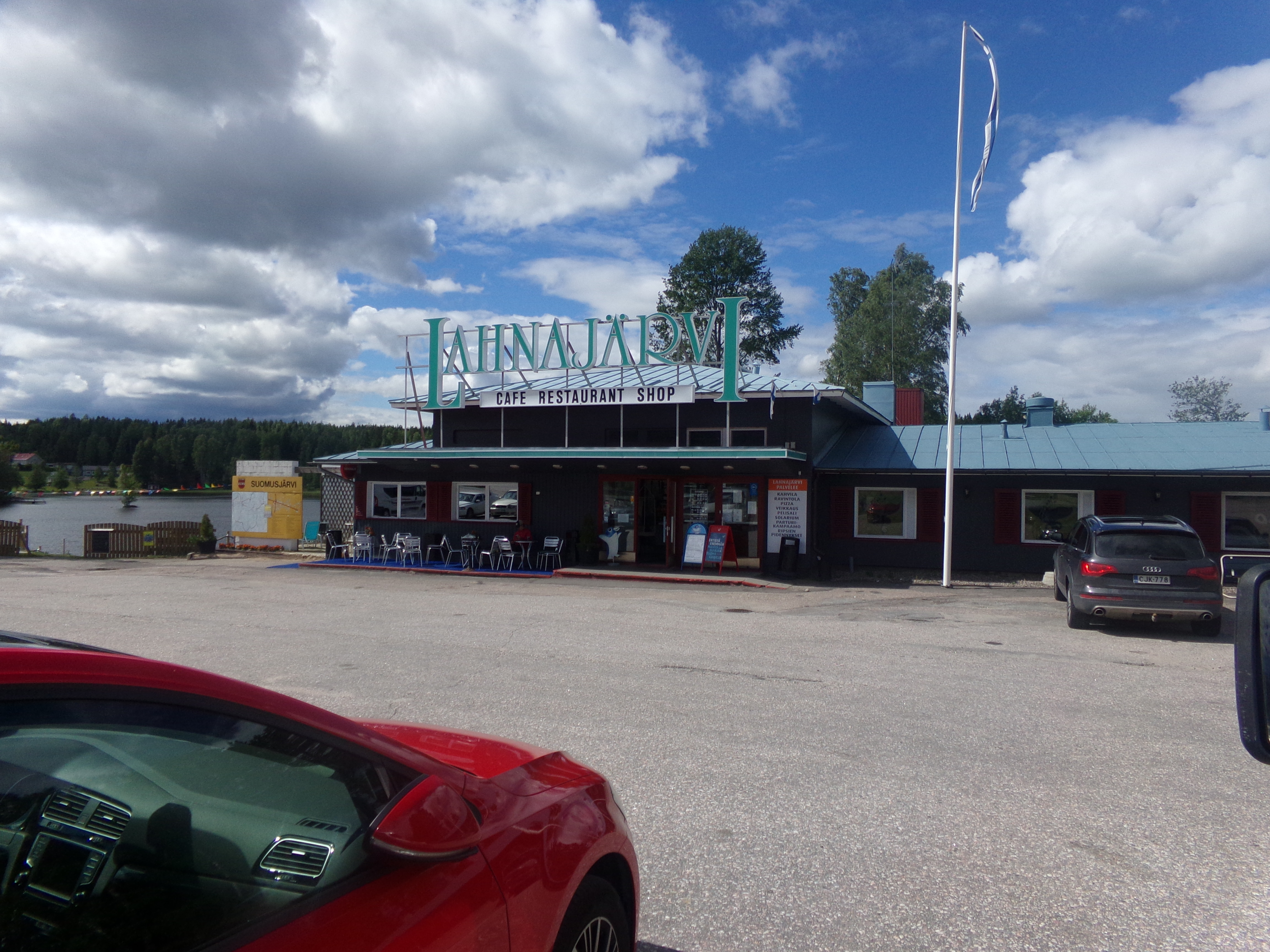
- Lahnajärvi's café restaurant along the road 110.
- Interactive map of Lahnajärvi
- Coordinates: 60°22.302′N 23°42.024′E
- Country: Finland
- Region: Southwest Finland
- Sub-region: Salo sub-region
- Municipality: Salo
- Postal code: 25420
- Website: lahnajarvi.fi

Lahnajärvi (Finnish pronunciation: [ˈlɑhnɑˌjærʋi]; lit. 'bream lake') is a village in Suomusjärvi, Salo, in Southwest Finland. It is located on the shores of lake of the same name about 7 kilometres (4.3 mi) east of Kitula, a former municipal centre of Suomusjärvi, and about 38 kilometres (24 mi) east of the Salo's town centre.

The village is best known for Finland's first rest stop built for motorists, which was completed for the 1952 Helsinki Olympics along regional road 110 (current Old Turku Road). The rest stop closed in 2008, after which it was opened and closed several times by new entrepreneurs over the years. The latest owner opened the rest stop in a renovated state in the summer of 2020.

Other local attractions in Lahnajärvi include the protected Rotomänty, an 18 metres (59 ft) pine tree estimated to be about 200 years old.

== See also ==
- Finnish national road 1 (E18)
- Kitula – village in Suomusjärvi, Salo
- Saukkola – village in Nummi-Pusula, Lohja
