= Aijala =

Coordinates: 60.190°N 23.352°E

Aijala is a village in the city of Salo in Varsinais-Suomi, Finland. It was the village of the year of Varsinais-Suomi in the year 2003.

From 1677 to 1916, lead was quarried in Hopeamäki and in Aurums from 1684 to 1957. Copper was quarried between 1688 and 1831, iron between 1948 and 1961. When the mine's own ore was exhausted, it operated as an ore refinery in the 1950s to 1970s for the ore that was being produced at the nearby Metsämonttu underground mine.
