= Teijo, Salo =

Village in Southwest Finland, Finland

Coordinates: 60°15.2545′N 22°57.1080′E

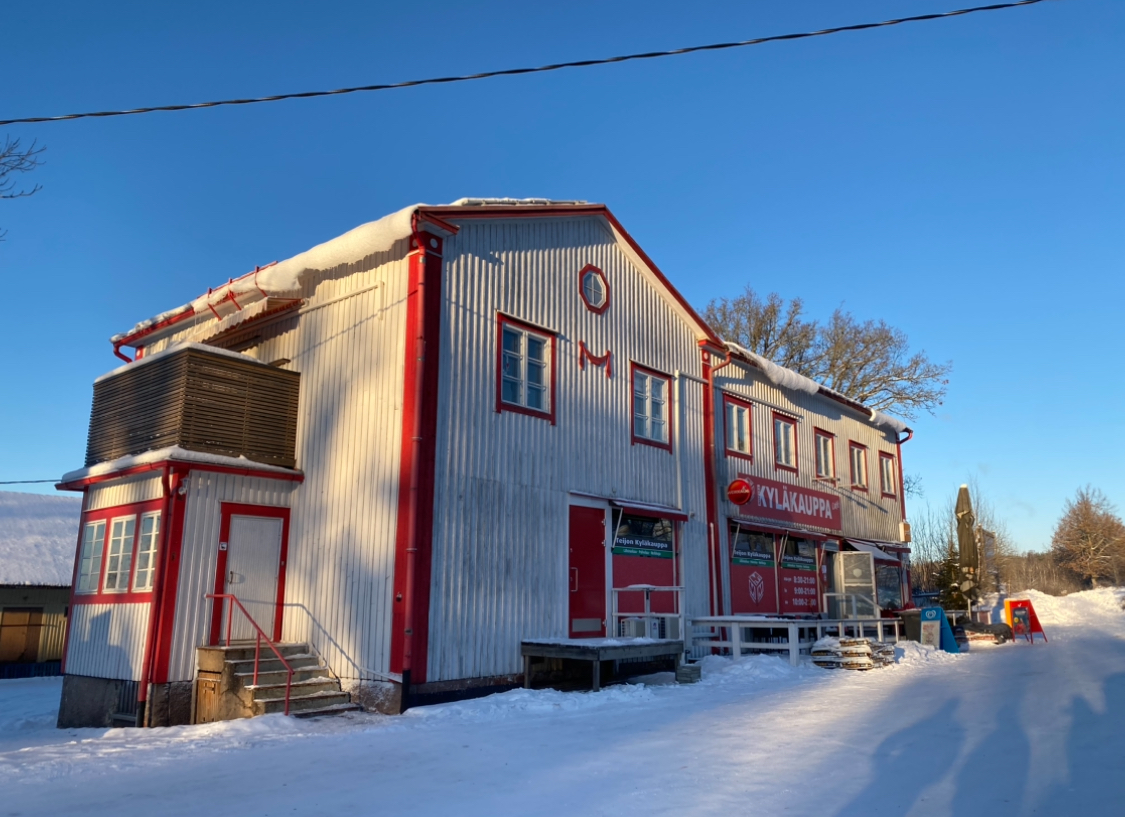
Teijon kyläkauppa, a M-Market chain store in the village

Teijo (Finnish: [ˈtei̯jo]; Swedish: Tykö) is a village in Perniö, Salo, in Southwest Finland. It is located about 22 kilometres (14 mi) southwest of the Salo's centre and about 15 kilometres (9.3 mi) west of the Perniö's centre. At the end of 2023, about 370 inhabitants lived in Teijo.

The village is known for Teijo Manor and its nearby ironworks, Marine Alutech's shipyard, and national park of the same name. There is also a ski resort in connection with the national park.

In 2010, Teijo was chosen as the village of the year in Southwest Finland.

== See also ==
- Angelniemi
- Kimitoön
