= Kuusjoki =

- Former municipality
- Kuusjoen kunta Kuusjoki kommun
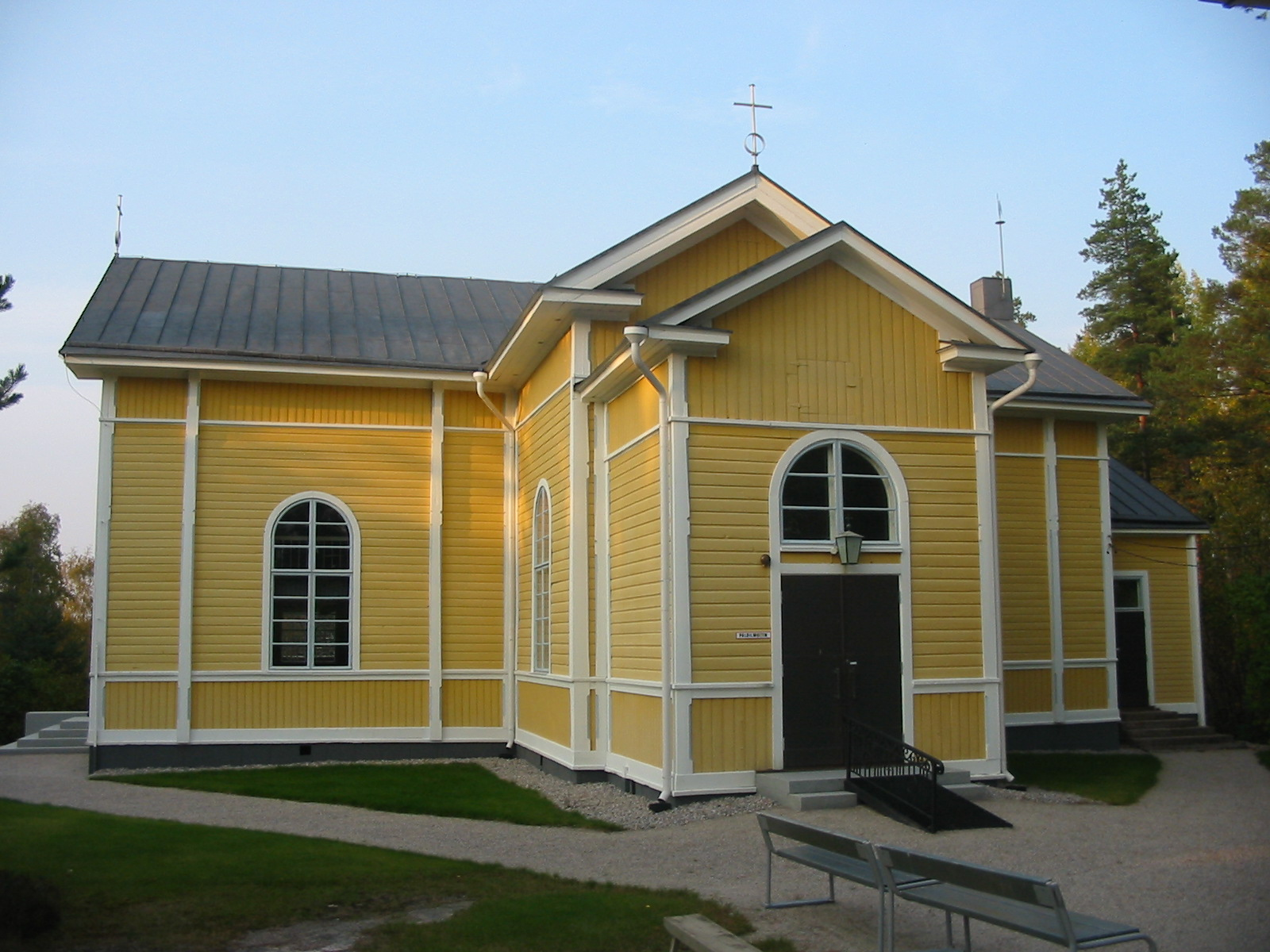
- Kuusjoki Church

- Coat of arms

- Interactive map of Kuusjoki
- Location within Southwest Finland Location within Finland Location within Europe
- Country: Finland
- Province: Western Finland
- Region: Southwest Finland
- Sub-region: Salo
- Merged into Salo: January 1, 2009

Government
  - City manager: Aarno Sola

Area
  - Total: 122.57 km^{2} (47.32 sq mi)
  - Land: 122.46 km^{2} (47.28 sq mi)
  - Water: 0.11 km^{2} (0.042 sq mi)
  - Rank: 379th

Population (2003)
  - Total: 1,800
  - Rank: 364th
  - Density: 15/km^{2} (38/sq mi)
- −1.9 % change
- Time zone: UTC+2 (EET)
  - Summer (DST): UTC+3 (EEST)
- Official languages: Finnish
- Urbanisation: 31.2%
- Unemployment rate: 7.9%
- Climate: Dfc
- Website: http://www.kuusjoki.fi/

Kuusjoki (Finnish pronunciation: [ˈkuːsjoki]) is a former municipality of Finland. It was consolidated with Salo on January 1, 2009. Neighbouring municipalities of Särkisalo were Halikko, Koski, Kiikala, Marttila, Pertteli, Salo, and Somero.

It is located in the province of Western Finland and is part of the Southwest Finland region. The municipality had a population of 1,781 (2004-12-31) and covered an area of 122.57 km² of which 0.11 km² is water. The population density was 14.54 inhabitants per km².

The municipality was unilingually Finnish.
