= Muurla =

- Former municipality
- Muurlan kunta Muurla kommun
- Coat of arms

- Interactive map of Muurla
- Location within Southwest Finland Location within Finland Location within Europe
- Country: Finland
- Province: Western Finland
- Region: Southwest Finland
- Sub-region: Salo
- Merged with Salo: January 1, 2009

Government
  - City manager: Mauri Hermunen

Area
  - Total: 83.16 km^{2} (32.11 sq mi)
  - Land: 80.16 km^{2} (30.95 sq mi)
  - Water: 3 km^{2} (1.2 sq mi)
  - Rank: 404th

Population (2003)
  - Total: 1,444
  - Rank: 387th
  - Density: 18.01/km^{2} (46.66/sq mi)
- −0.6 % change
- Time zone: UTC+2 (EET)
  - Summer (DST): UTC+3 (EEST)
- Official languages: Finnish
- Urbanisation: 57.6%
- Unemployment rate: 8.5%
- Website: http://www.muurla.fi/

Muurla (Finnish pronunciation: [ˈmuːrlɑ]) is a former municipality of Finland. It was consolidated with Salo on 1 January 2009. Neighbouring municipalities of Muurla were Kisko, Perniö, Pertteli and Salo.

It is located in the province of Western Finland and is part of the Southwest Finland region. The municipality had a population of 1,455 (2004-12-31) and covered an area of 83.16 km^{2} of which 3.00 km^{2} is water. The population density was 18.15 inhabitants per km^{2}.

The municipality was unilingually Finnish.
