= Pertteli =

Pertteli Pertteli – S:t Bertils
- Former municipality
- Perttelin kunta S:t Bertils kommun
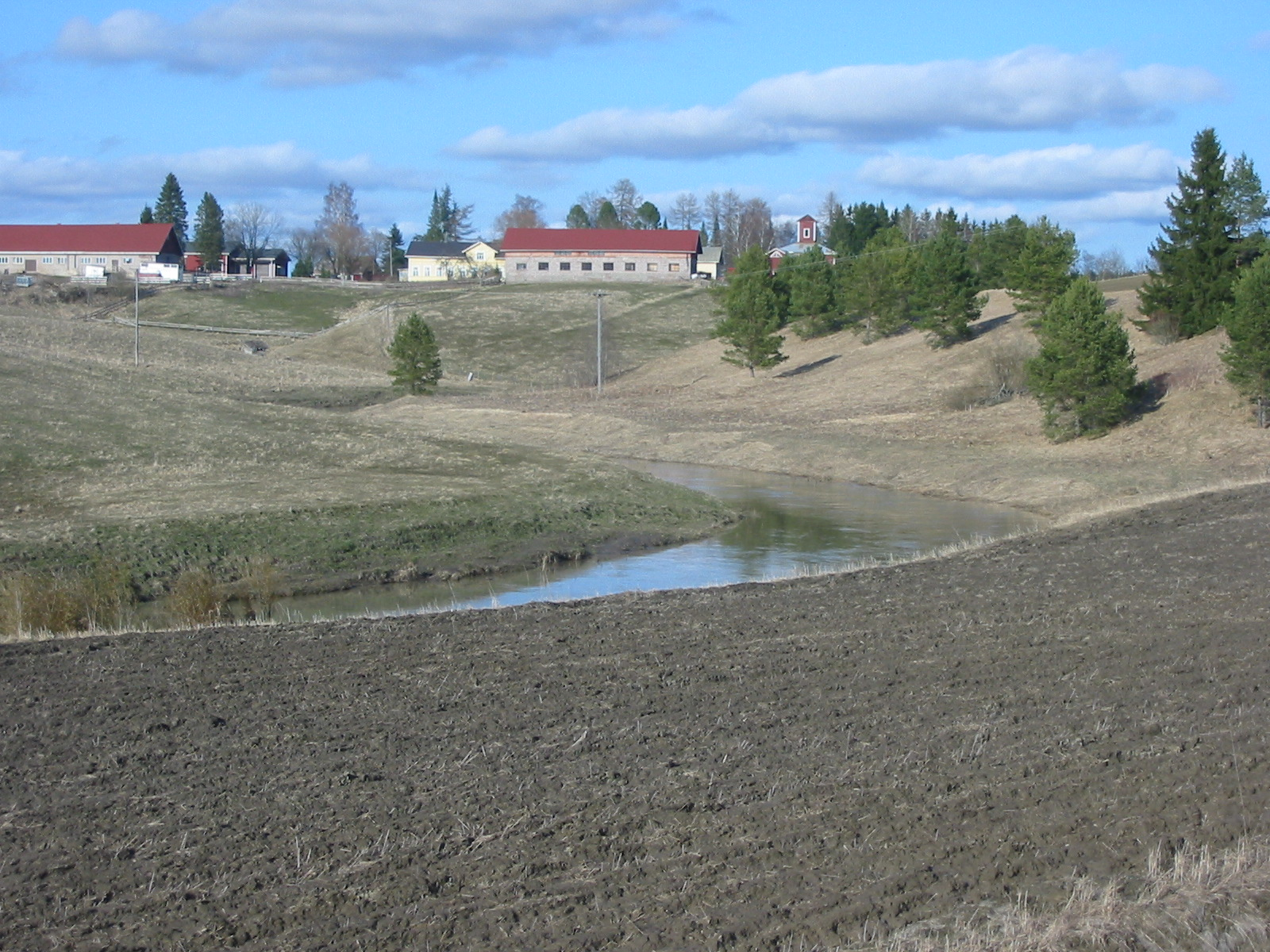
- Haali Manor in Pertteli.

- Coat of arms

- Interactive map of Pertteli
- Location within Southwest Finland Location within Finland Location within Europe
- Country: Finland
- Province: Western Finland
- Region: Southwest Finland
- Sub-region: Salo
- Merged with Salo: January 1, 2009
- Seat: Inkere

Government
  - City manager: Ilkka Salminen

Area
  - Total: 156.08 km^{2} (60.26 sq mi)
  - Land: 154.15 km^{2} (59.52 sq mi)
  - Water: 1.93 km^{2} (0.75 sq mi)
  - Rank: 356th

Population (2003)
  - Total: 3,773
  - Rank: 248th
  - Density: 24.48/km^{2} (63.39/sq mi)
- +1.6 % change
- Time zone: UTC+2 (EET)
  - Summer (DST): UTC+3 (EEST)
- Official languages: Finnish
- Urbanisation: 59.5%
- Unemployment rate: 8.3%
- Website: http://www.pertteli.fi/

Pertteli (Finnish pronunciation: [ˈpertːeli]); Swedish: S:t Bertils) is a former municipality of Finland. It was consolidated with Salo on January 1, 2009. Neighboring municipalities were Kiikala, Kisko, Kuusjoki, Muurla and Salo.

It is located in the province of Western Finland and is part of the Southwest Finland region. The municipality had a population of 3,833 (2004-12-31) and covered an area of 156.08 km^{2} of which 1.93 km^{2} is water. The population density was 24.87 inhabitants per km^{2}. Inkere was the administrative center of Pertteli.

The municipality was unilingually Finnish.

Saint Bartholomew is the namesake of the municipality and is the subject of the heraldic shield.
