= Suomusjärvi =

Coordinates: 60°22′45″N 23°35′25″E

- Former municipality
- Suomusjärven kunta Suomusjärvi kommun
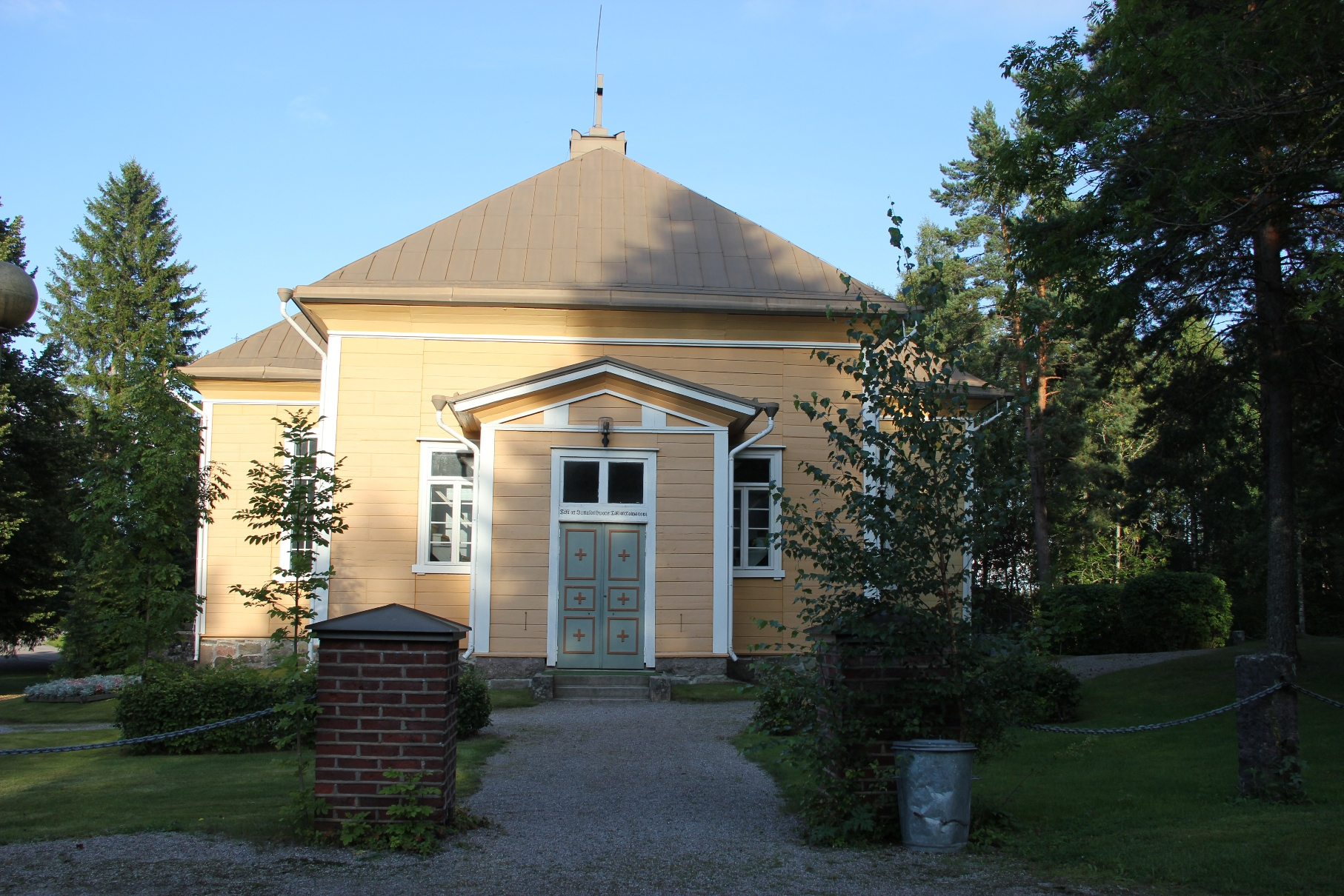
- Suomusjärvi Church

- Coat of arms

- Interactive map of Suomusjärvi
- Country: Finland
- Province: Western Finland
- Region: Southwest Finland
- Sub-region: Salo
- Merged with Salo: January 1, 2009
- Seat: Kitula

Government
  - City manager: Vesa Ketola

Area
  - Total: 176.53 km^{2} (68.16 sq mi)
  - Land: 160.15 km^{2} (61.83 sq mi)
  - Water: 16.38 km^{2} (6.32 sq mi)
  - Rank: 349th

Population (2003)
  - Total: 1,311
  - Rank: 397th
  - Density: 8.186/km^{2} (21.20/sq mi)
- −1.0 % change
- Time zone: UTC+2 (EET)
  - Summer (DST): UTC+3 (EEST)
- Official languages: Finnish
- Urbanisation: 42.8%
- Unemployment rate: 10.8%
- Website: http://www.suomusjarvi.fi/

Suomusjärvi (Finnish pronunciation: [ˈsuo̯musˌjærʋi]) is a former municipality of Finland. It was consolidated with Salo on January 1, 2009.

It is located in the province of Western Finland and is part of the Southwest Finland region. The municipality had a population of 1,321 (December 31, 2004) and covered an area of 176.53 km^{2} of which 16.38 km^{2} is water. The population density was 8.25 inhabitants per km^{2}. Its administrative center is Kitula.

The municipality was unilingually Finnish.

== History ==
Suomusjärvi was first mentioned in 1540, when it was a part of the parish of Kisko. It got its own chapel community in 1678. The chapel community was also known as Laidike as the church of the community was located in the village of Laidike. A new church was built in the village of Suomusjärvi in 1703, but the parish was still called Laidike in 1722. Suomusjärvi became an independent parish in 1898.

Suomusjärvi was consolidated with Salo in 2009.

== See also ==
- Lahnajärvi
