= Salo, Finland =

City in Southwest Finland, Finland

Salo
- City
- Salon kaupunki Salo stad
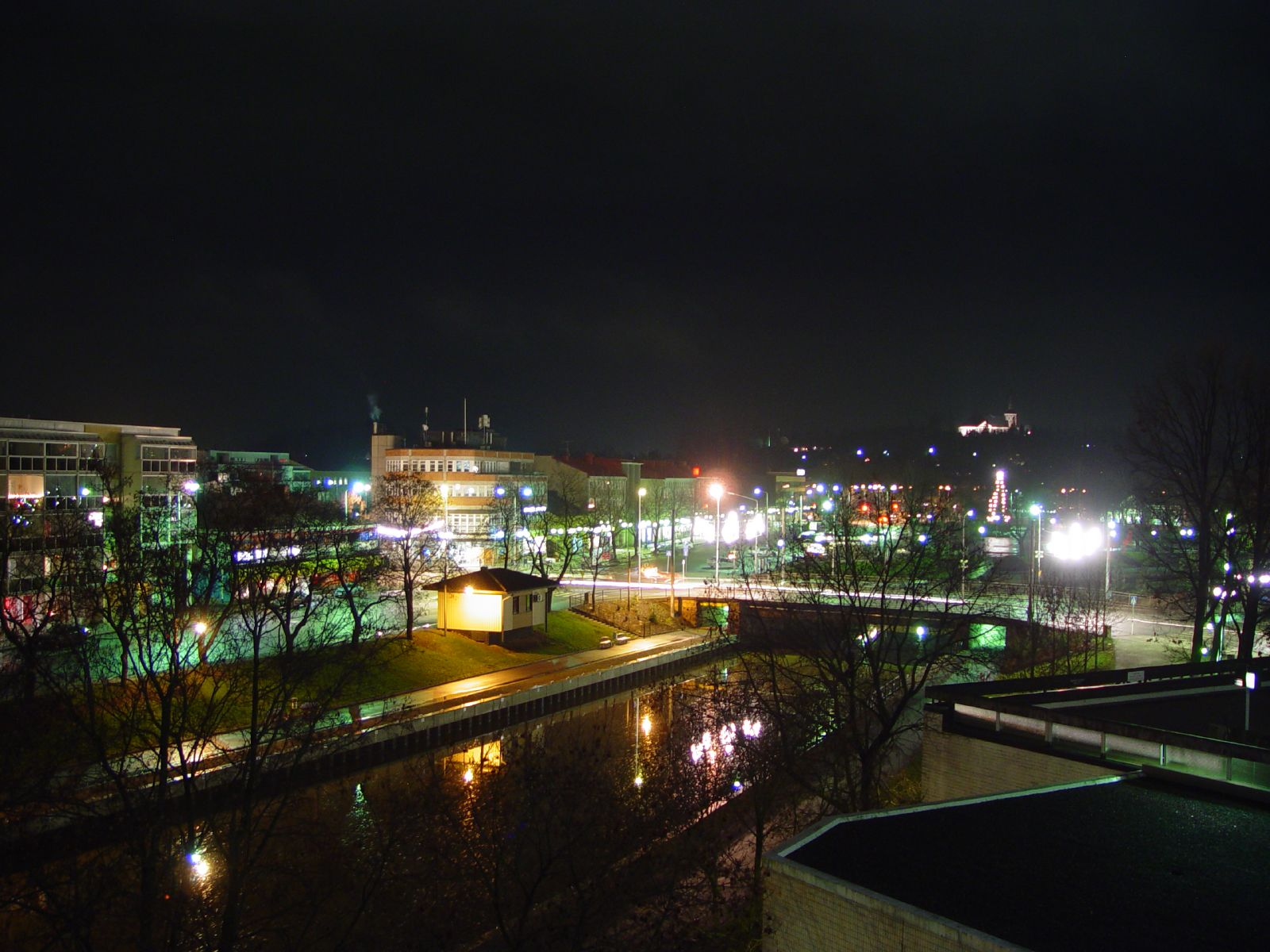
- Salo city centre by night

- Coat of arms

- Location of Salo in Finland
- Interactive map of Salo
- Location within Southwest Finland Location within Finland Location within Europe
- Coordinates: 60°23′10″N 023°07′30″E
- Country: Finland
- Region: Southwest Finland
- Sub-region: Salo
- Market town: 1887
- City rights: 1960

Government
  - City manager: Anna-Kristiina Korhonen

Area (2018-01-01)
  - City: 2,168.30 km^{2} (837.19 sq mi)
  - Land: 1,987.44 km^{2} (767.35 sq mi)
  - Water: 181.78 km^{2} (70.19 sq mi)
  - Rank: 30th largest in Finland

Population (2025-12-31)
  - City: 50,339
  - Rank: 20th largest in Finland
  - Density: 25.33/km^{2} (65.6/sq mi)
  - Metro: 64,650

Population by native language
  - Finnish: 89.3% (official)
  - Swedish: 1.2%
  - Others: 9.5%

Population by age
  - 0 to 14: 14%
  - 15 to 64: 58.2%
  - 65 or older: 27.8%
- Time zone: UTC+02:00 (EET)
  - Summer (DST): UTC+03:00 (EEST)
- Climate: Dfb
- Website: salo.fi/en/

Salo (Finnish pronunciation: [ˈsɑlo]) is a city in Finland, located in the southwestern interior of the country. The population of Salo is approximately 50,000, while the sub-region has a population of approximately 59,000. It is the 20th most populous municipality in Finland, and the 24th most populous urban area in the country.

Salo is located in the Southwest Finland. Salo covers an area of 2,168.30 square kilometres (837.19 sq mi) of which 181.78 km^{2} (70.19 sq mi) is water. The population density is 25.33/km^{2} (65.6/sq mi). The municipality is unilingually Finnish.

The name Salo means woodland, backwoods, but also a wooded island in Finnish. It is believed that Salo originally referred to an island located south of the current town over a thousand years ago, which is now a hill due to post-glacial rebound, and not even close to the sea today.

Salo is a small city located between the capital Helsinki (114 kilometres (71 mi) away) and the provincial capital Turku (52 kilometres (32 mi) away). The city's proximity to these larger cities has contributed to the growth of Salo's business sector. Additionally, farming plays a significant role in the area. Salo shares borders with Koski Tl, Lohja, Kimitoön, Marttila, Paimio, Raseborg, Sauvo and Somero. Salo is also twinned with Saint Anthony Village in Minnesota.

Salo was previously recognised for its significant consumer electronics and mobile phone industry. Nokia, and briefly Microsoft Mobile, operated a manufacturing plant in the town. However, the plant was closed in 2015, resulting in high unemployment rates.

Salo is the birthplace of the former president of Finland Sauli Niinistö.

== History ==
Salo has existed as a centre of rural commerce since at least the 16th century, emerging in the location where the Great Coastal Road, the important East-West road, crossed River Salo; the river provided the fairway to the sea. In 1887 Salo officially became a market town and, in the beginning of 1891, an independent Municipality. The area of the municipality was initially very small, only 0.65 km^{2}. In 1932 it grew to 18 km^{2} when areas from neighbouring Uskela and Halikko were annexed to Salo. Eventually Salo became a town in 1960. The municipality of Uskela was consolidated with Salo 1967. The municipalities of Halikko, Kiikala, Kisko, Kuusjoki, Muurla, Perniö, Pertteli, Suomusjärvi and Särkisalo were consolidated with Salo in the beginning of 2009. Salo is also a popular last name in Finland.

== Climate ==
Climate data for Salo Kärkkä (elevation 47 m) 1991–2020 normals, extremes 1959– present
Month	Jan	Feb	Mar	Apr	May	Jun	Jul	Aug	Sep	Oct	Nov	Dec	Year
Record high °C (°F)	8.9 (48.0)	9.2 (48.6)	16.4 (61.5)	23.8 (74.8)	29.6 (85.3)	31.9 (89.4)	33.2 (91.8)	32.5 (90.5)	27.8 (82.0)	18.5 (65.3)	14.0 (57.2)	10.8 (51.4)	33.2 (91.8)
Mean maximum °C (°F)	4.9 (40.8)	4.6 (40.3)	9.7 (49.5)	18.3 (64.9)	25.2 (77.4)	26.8 (80.2)	28.7 (83.7)	27.4 (81.3)	21.9 (71.4)	14.8 (58.6)	9.6 (49.3)	6.0 (42.8)	29.6 (85.3)
Mean daily maximum °C (°F)	−1.0 (30.2)	−1.3 (29.7)	2.9 (37.2)	9.8 (49.6)	16.3 (61.3)	20.2 (68.4)	23.0 (73.4)	21.4 (70.5)	16.0 (60.8)	9.1 (48.4)	3.9 (39.0)	0.9 (33.6)	10.1 (50.2)
Daily mean °C (°F)	−3.8 (25.2)	−4.5 (23.9)	−1.3 (29.7)	4.5 (40.1)	10.5 (50.9)	15.0 (59.0)	17.8 (64.0)	16.2 (61.2)	11.2 (52.2)	5.7 (42.3)	1.6 (34.9)	−1.4 (29.5)	6.0 (42.8)
Mean daily minimum °C (°F)	−7.0 (19.4)	−8.0 (17.6)	−5.2 (22.6)	−0.2 (31.6)	4.7 (40.5)	9.6 (49.3)	12.6 (54.7)	11.3 (52.3)	7.2 (45.0)	2.6 (36.7)	−0.8 (30.6)	−4.2 (24.4)	1.9 (35.4)
Mean minimum °C (°F)	−21.1 (−6.0)	−20.9 (−5.6)	−16.5 (2.3)	−6.9 (19.6)	−2.3 (27.9)	3.1 (37.6)	7.0 (44.6)	4.7 (40.5)	−0.7 (30.7)	−6.4 (20.5)	−10.6 (12.9)	−15.9 (3.4)	−24.6 (−12.3)
Record low °C (°F)	−36.6 (−33.9)	−37.5 (−35.5)	−32.5 (−26.5)	−21.5 (−6.7)	−6.9 (19.6)	−0.9 (30.4)	2.0 (35.6)	0.1 (32.2)	−7.9 (17.8)	−16.5 (2.3)	−22.6 (−8.7)	−34.1 (−29.4)	−37.5 (−35.5)
Source 1: FMI temperature normals for Finland 1991–2020
Source 2: Record highs and lows 1959– present

== Demographics ==
=== Population ===
The city of Salo has 50,339 inhabitants, making it the 20th most populous municipality in Finland. The Salo region has a population of 58,678. In Salo, 8.6% of the population has a foreign background, which is slightly below the national average.

Population size 1990–2025
Year	Population
1990	49,834
1995	50,922
2000	52,604
2005	53,672
2010	55,235
2015	53,890
2020	51,562
2025	50,339

=== Languages ===
Population by
mother tongue (2025)
1. Finnish (89.3%)
2. Ukrainian (2.00%)
3. Russian (1.80%)
4. Estonian (1.40%)
5. Swedish (1.20%)
6. Kurdish (0.70%)
7. Albanian (0.40%)
8. Other (3.20%)

Salo is a monolingual Finnish-speaking municipality. The majority of the population, 44,975 persons (89.3%), spoke Finnish as their first language. In addition, the number of Swedish speakers was 582 persons (1.2%) of the population. Foreign languages were spoken by 9.5% of the population. As English and Swedish are compulsory school subjects, functional bilingualism or trilingualism acquired through language studies is not uncommon.

At least 30 different languages are spoken in Salo. The most common foreign languages are Ukrainian (2.0%), Russian (1.8%), Estonian (1.4%) and Kurdish (0.7%).

=== Immigration ===
Population by country of birth (2025)
Country of birth	Population	%
Finland	45,810	91.0
Soviet Union	1,118	2.2
Estonia	555	1.1
Ukraine	547	1.1
Iraq	262	0.5
Sweden	210	0.4
Thailand	137	0.3
Latvia	130	0.3
Russia	130	0.3
Yugoslavia	98	0.2
Other	956	1.9

As of 2024, there were 4,807 persons with a migrant background living in Salo, or 9% of the population. (Note: Statistics Finland classifies a person as having a "foreign background" if both parents or the only known parent were born abroad.) The number of residents who were born abroad was 4,456, or 9% of the population. The number of persons with foreign citizenship living in Salo was 3,350. Most foreign-born citizens came from the former Soviet Union, Estonia, Sweden and Iraq.

The relative share of immigrants in Salo's population is slightly below the national average. However, the city's new residents are increasingly of foreign origin. This will increase the proportion of foreign residents in the coming years.

=== Religion ===
In 2023, the Evangelical Lutheran Church was the largest religious group with 70.4% of the population of Salo. Other religious groups accounted for 1.8% of the population. 27.8% of the population had no religious affiliation.

== Industry ==
Salo was well known in Finland and around the world for its large mobile phone factory operated by Nokia. Nokia first started producing mobile phones in Salo in 1981. A new plant, 15,000 square metres, opened in June 1995. By this time 1,200 people were employed there, and it exported products to 70 countries as of 1995. As of 2008, 5,000 people were employed at the plant.

In 2012 amid heavy financial losses, Nokia laid off a third of Salo's 3,500 workforce and gradually shifted manufacturing to Asia. It had a negative impact on the town with unemployment rising. In 2010 Nokia accounted for 95% of the town's corporate tax income, amounting to €60 million, but this dropped to just €14 million by 2012. By the end of the year Salo no longer produced hardware and became a research and development centre.

After the centre was in the hands of Microsoft Mobile, layoffs continued and eventually in June 2015 Microsoft announced the closure of the plant, putting the jobs of the 1,100 employees at risk. By this time Salo's unemployment rate was 15%, and the layoffs could push that further to 20%. Solidarity was expressed by some Finnish politicians after Salo's decline, which also came amid Finland's slow post-2008 crisis economy.

== Sports ==
The city is home to the professional basketball team Salon Vilpas Vikings, which plays in the Finish 1st Division Korisliiga. It plays its home games in the Salohalli. The most important orienteering club is Angelniemen Ankkuri, which organizes the Halikko relay every autumn.

== Transportation ==
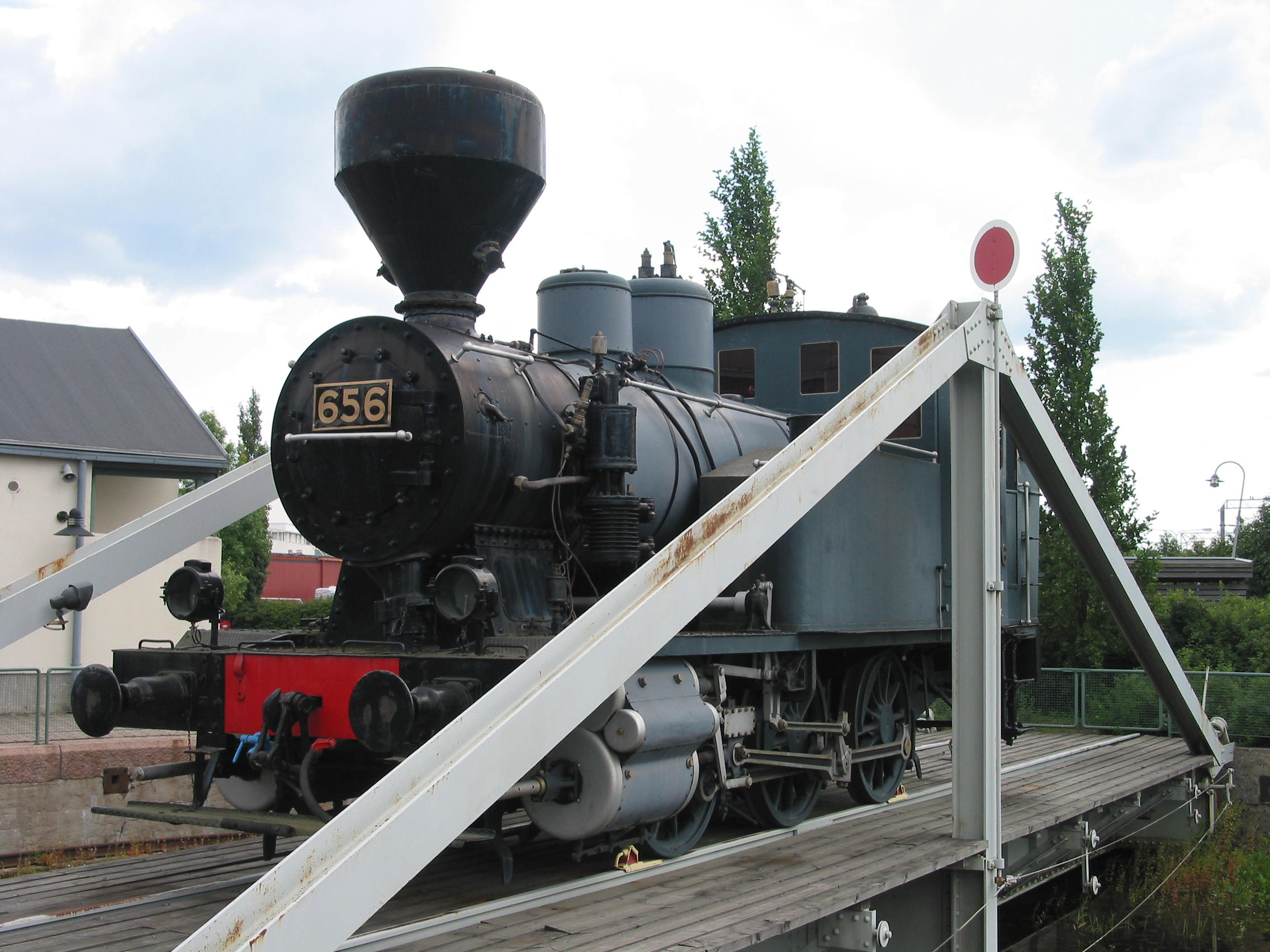
VR Class Vr1 steam locomotive no. 656 "Kana" ("Hen") on a turntable outside Salo Art Museum

European route E18 runs through Salo, passing the city center a few kilometers North, but the national road 52 between Raseborg and Somero goes through the city center. The "Coastal Railway" from Helsinki to Turku and further to Turku Harbour crosses the town center; all InterCity trains and most of the high-speed Pendolino trains stop at Salo railway station. The closest airports are Turku Airport (limited number of domestic and international flights) and Helsinki-Vantaa Airport.

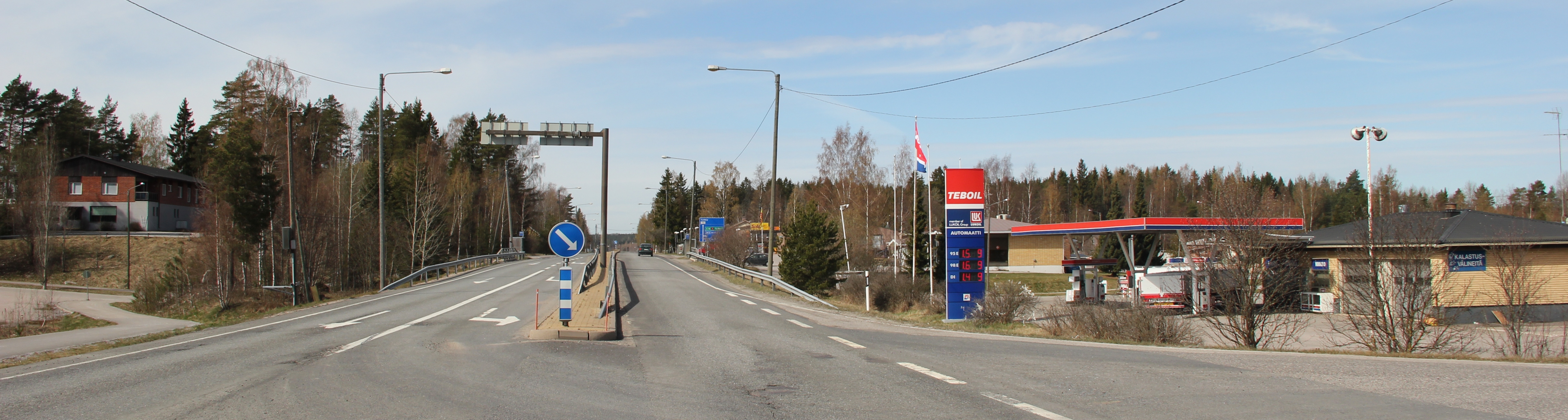
Regional road 110 (Old Turku Road) in the village of Kitula

In 2016, the city of Salo signed a letter of intent with Los Angeles-based company Virgin Hyperloop One to launch a project to build a 50 km long Hyperloop tube between Salo and Turku.

== Events ==
In recent years, the town of Salo has become known for the popular Kurpitsaviikot ("Pumpkin Weeks"), which are organized in Halikko in every autumn. At the local field, thousands of different sizes pumpkins and carved jack-o'-lanterns are presented to Tourists. The event celebrating Halloween culture has gathered audiences from all over Finland, from Hanko to Ivalo, and for example, the event organized in 2020 had as many as 100,000 visitors. The event has also been noticed abroad, all the way to North America. The significance of the event has also been emphasized by the fact that the 12th President of Finland, Sauli Niinistö, who was born in Salo, was officially opening the event's Pumpkin Park in October 2025.

== International relations ==
=== Twin towns – eleven cities ===
Salo has eight Sister cities:

- Anija, Estonia
- Elva, Estonia
- Gárdony, Hungary
- Nagykanizsa, Hungary
- Odder, Denmark
- Puchheim, Germany
- Rzhev, Russia
- St. Anthony, Minnesota, USA
- Wuhan, China
- Danang, Vietnam

== See also ==
- Aijala
- Lahnajärvi
- Teijo, Salo

== Photo gallery ==
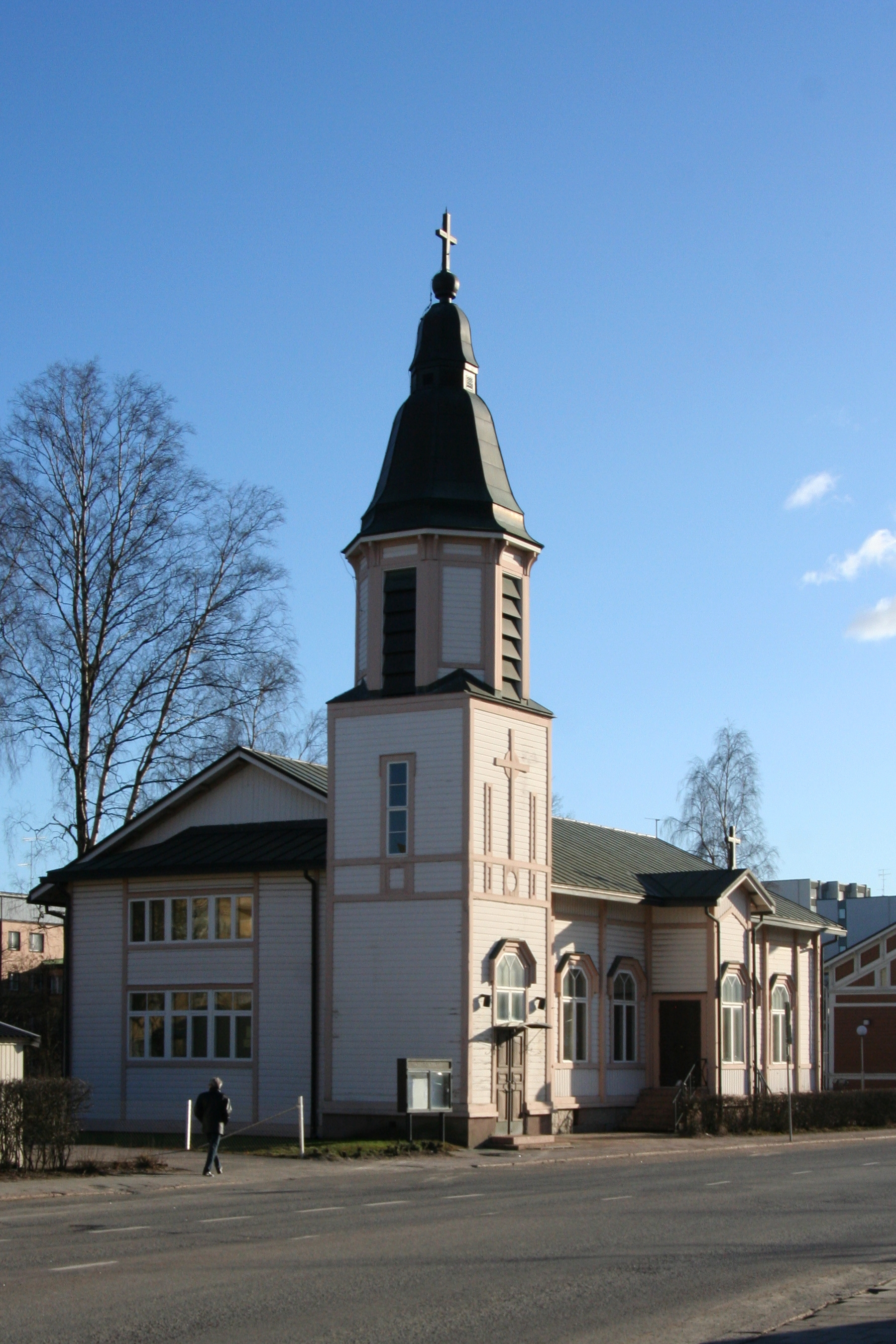
Wooden Salo Church

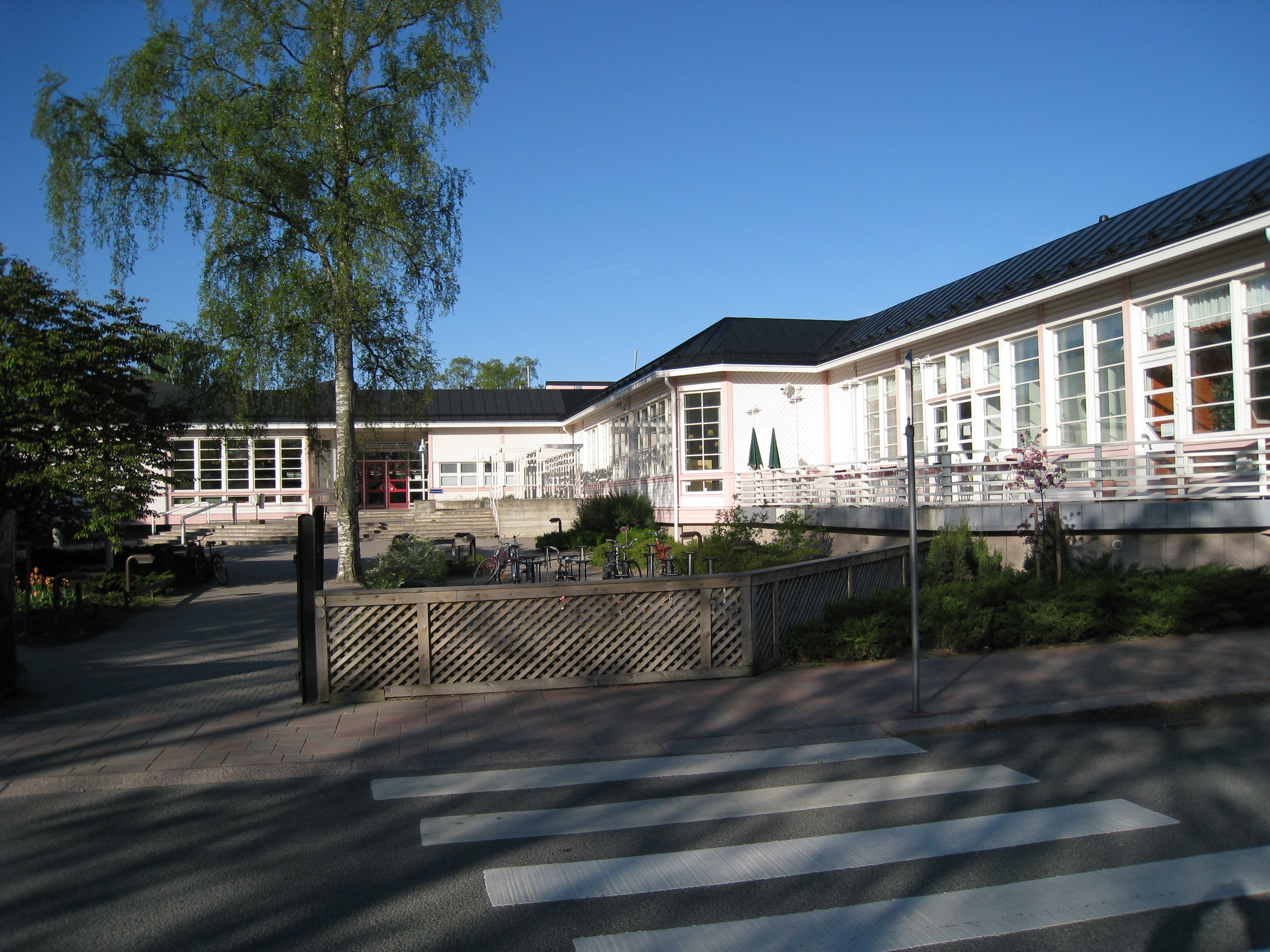
Municipal library. The new library building has been designed to fit in the environment of old wooden houses.

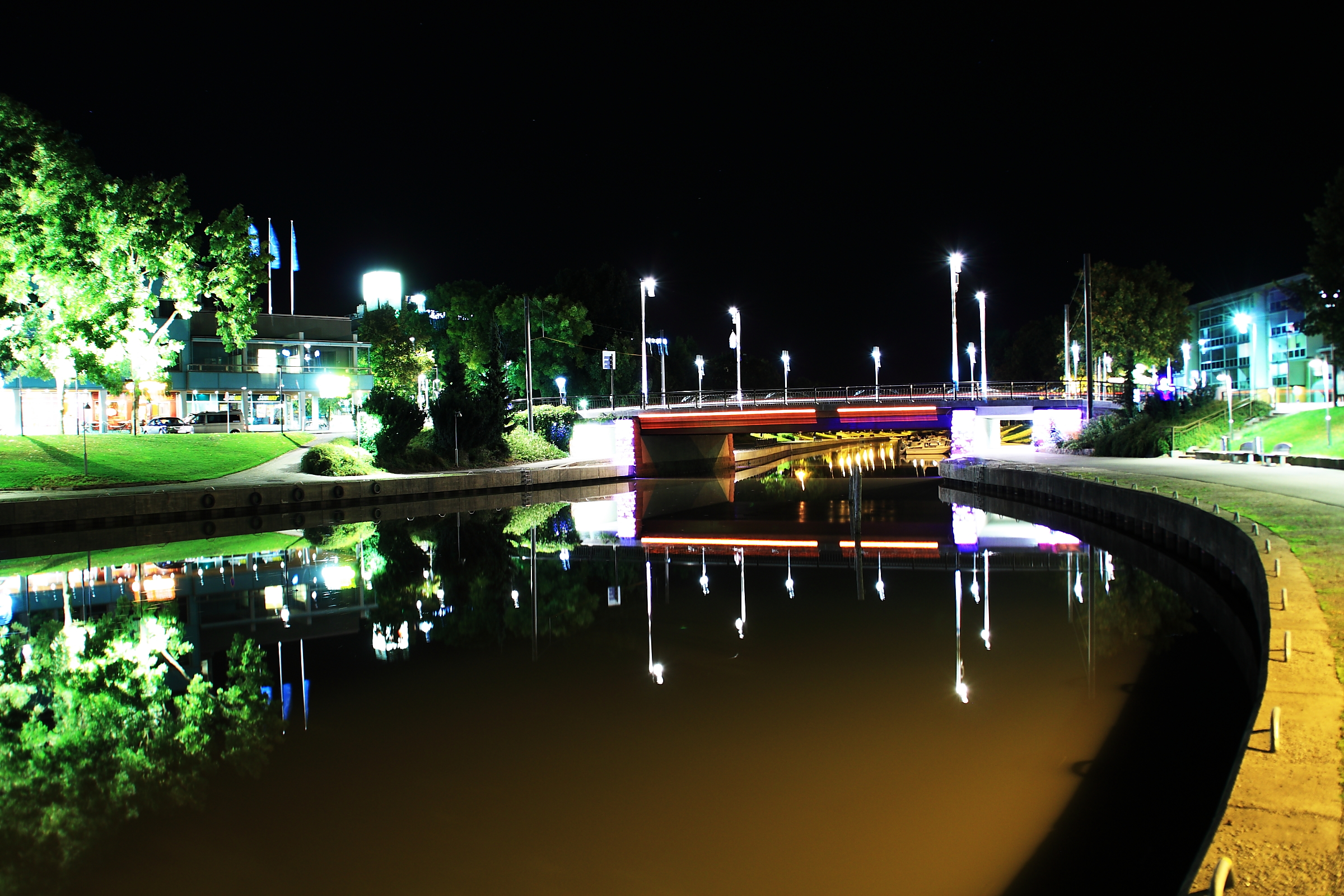
Salo River at night

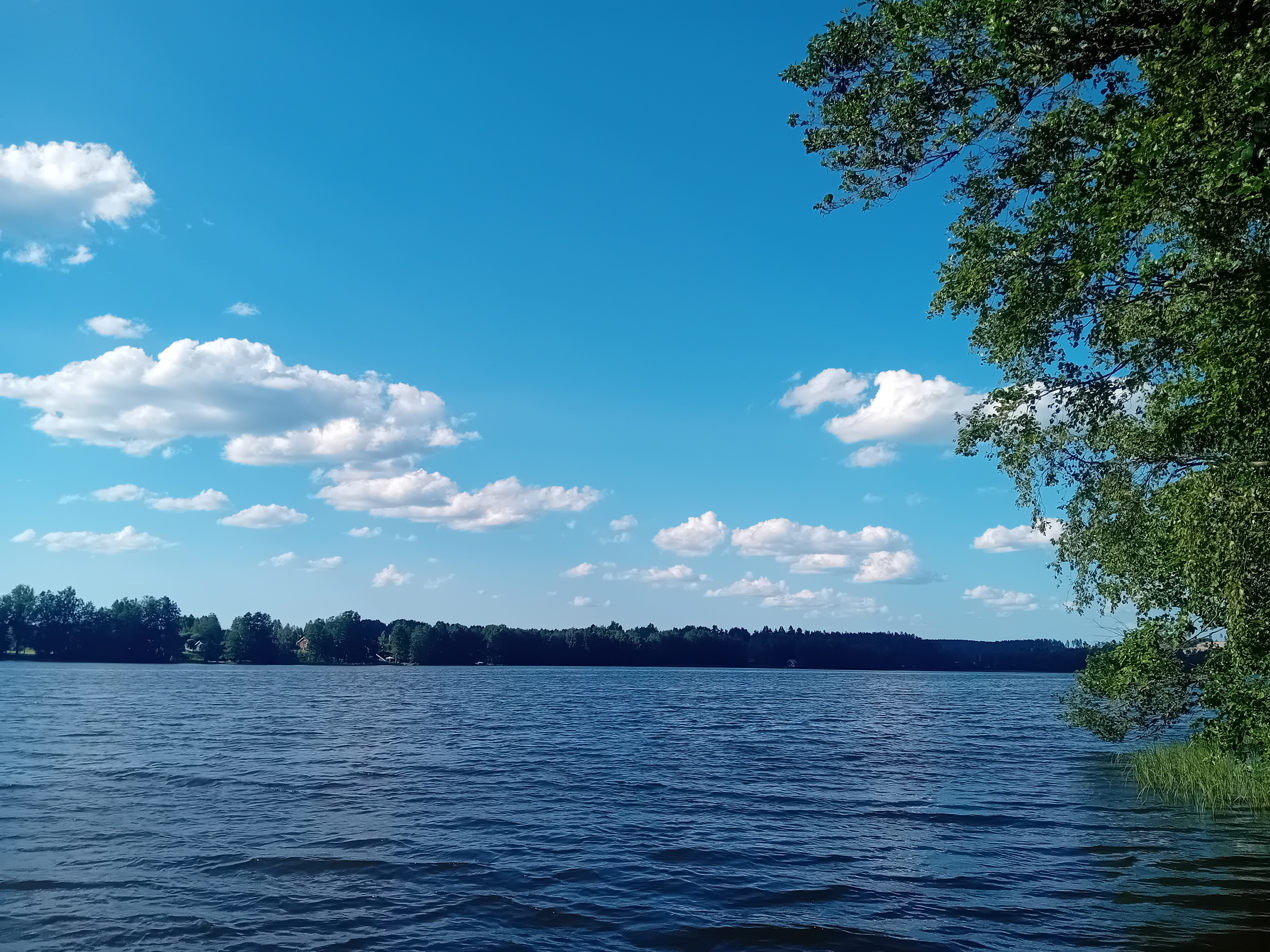
Lake Lahnajärvi in the former Suomusjärvi municipality in Salo.

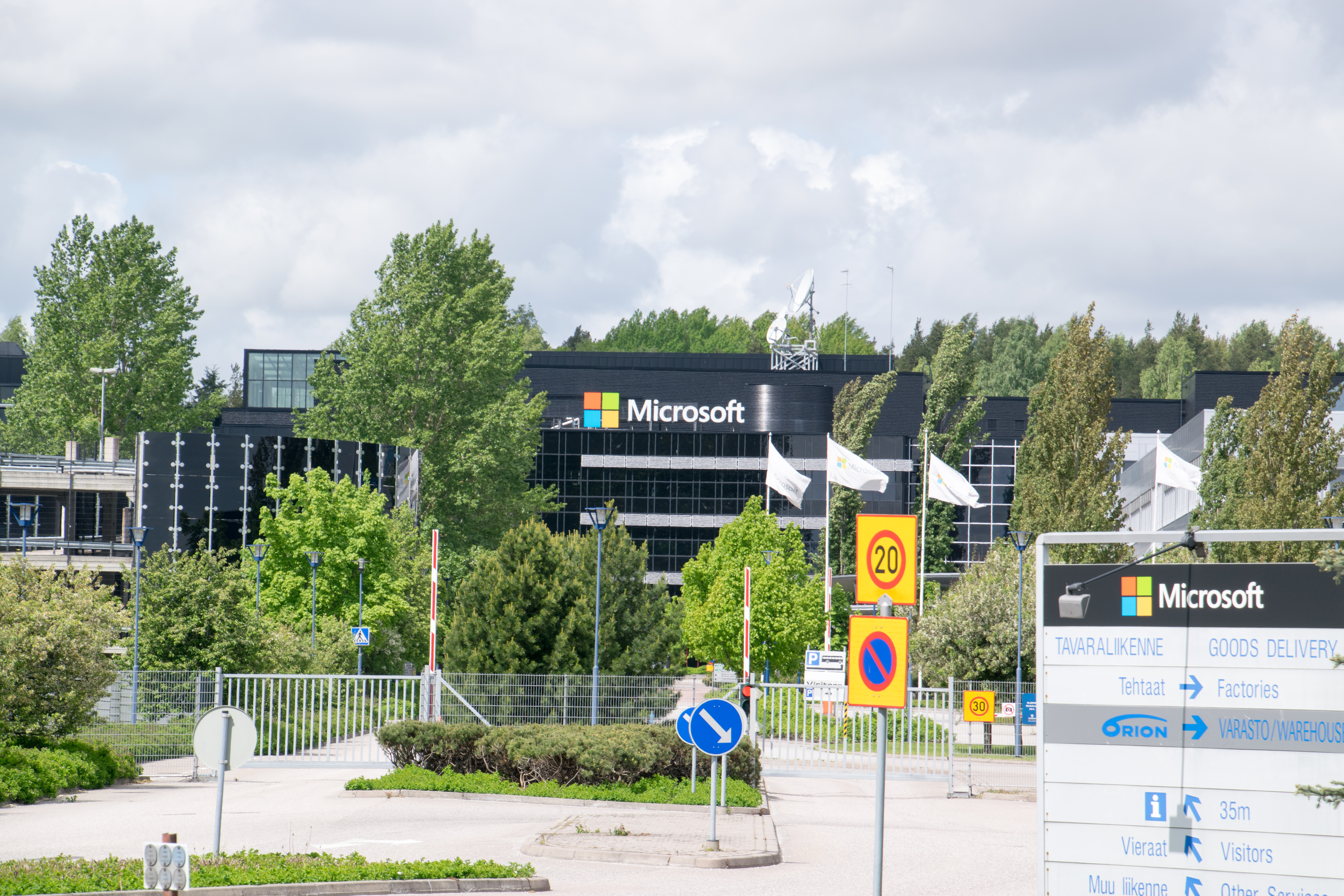
Microsoft premises in Salo.

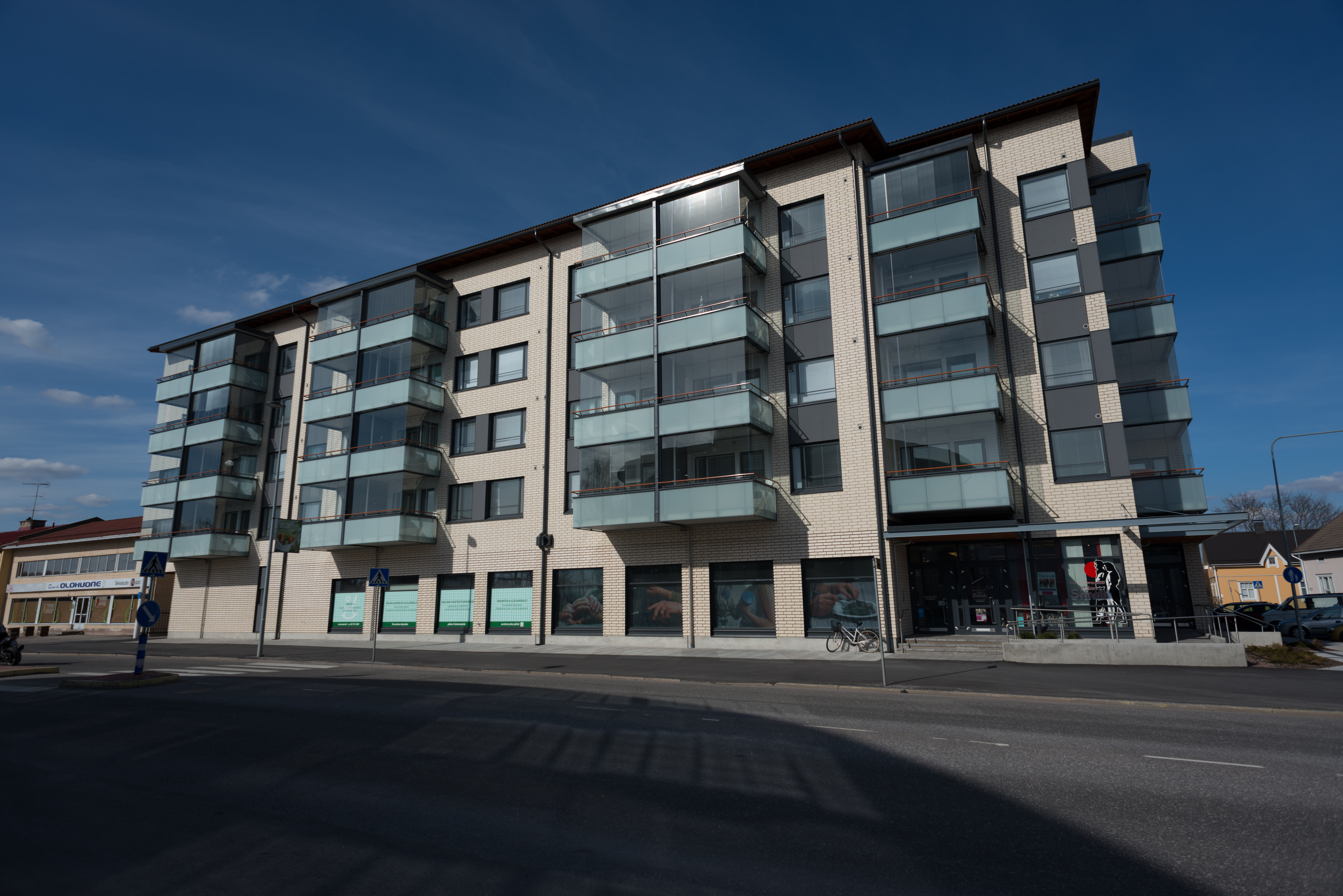
Apartment building along Turuntie.

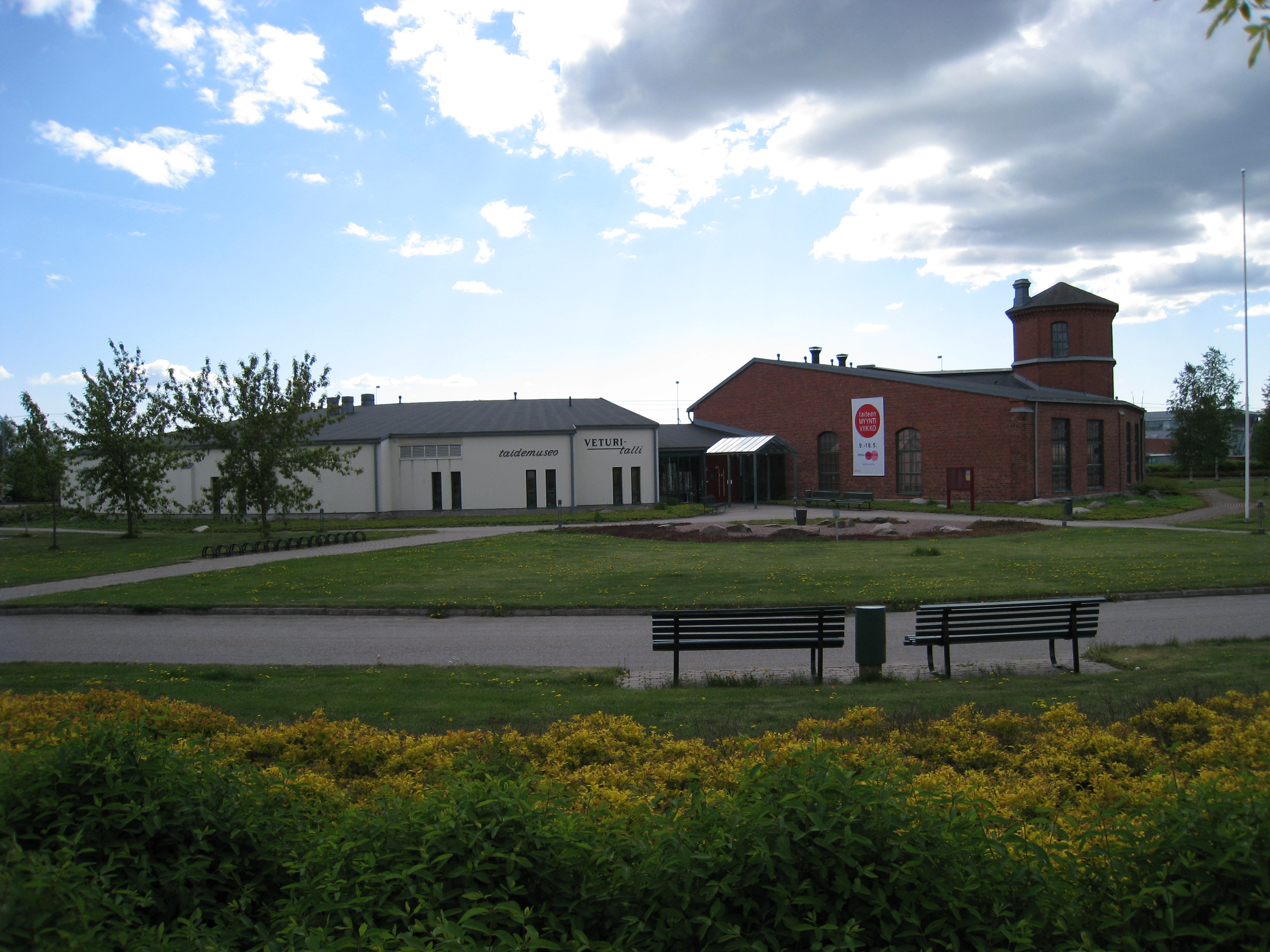
Art gallery in the old locomotive shed.

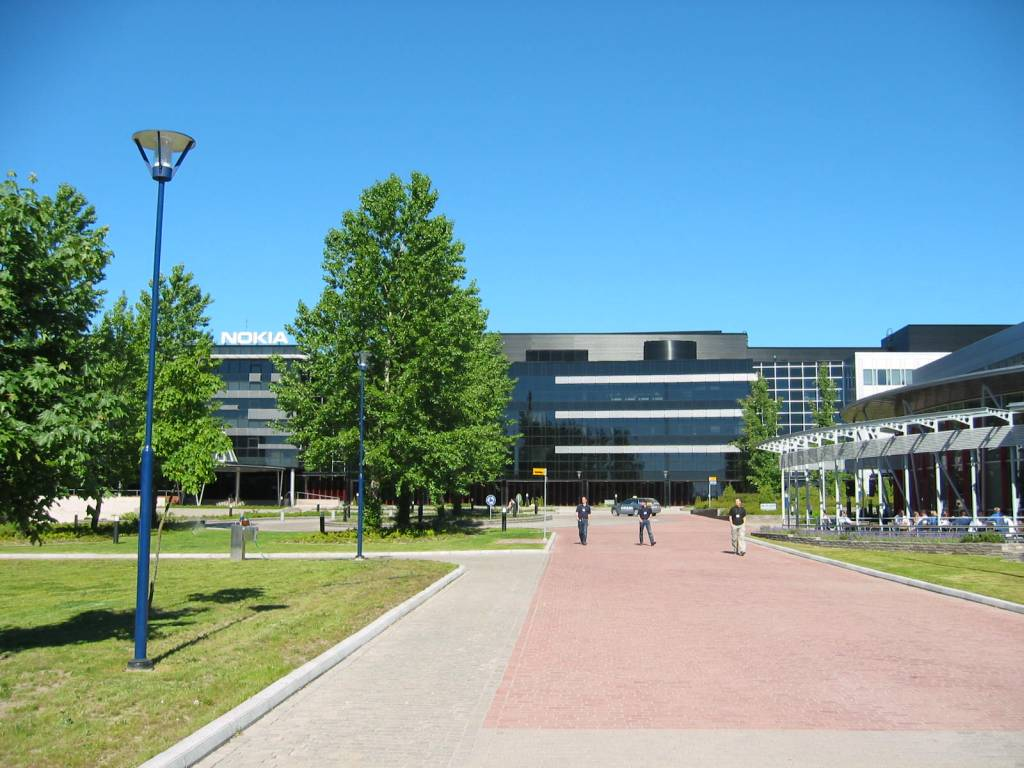
Nokia building in Salo in 2002
