= Halikko =

- Former municipality
- Halikon kunta Halikko kommun
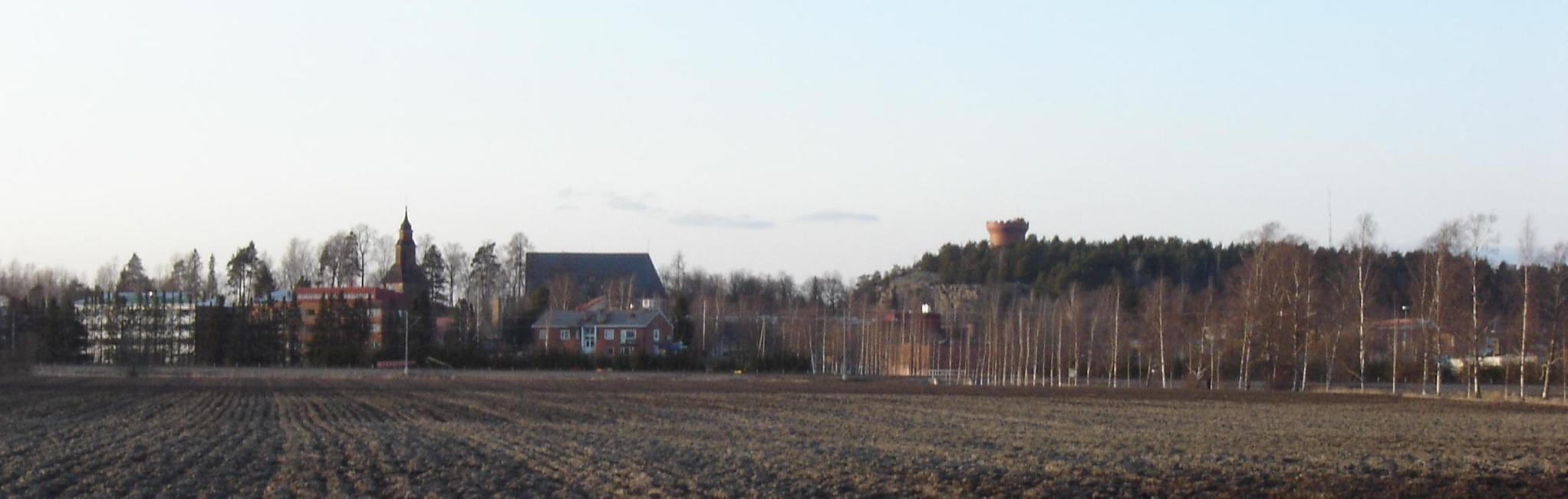
- View to the Halikko centre.

- Coat of arms

- Location of Halikko in Finland (2008).
- Interactive map of Halikko
- Location within Southwest Finland Location within Finland Location within Europe
- Country: Finland
- Province: Western Finland
- Region: Southwest Finland
- Sub-region: Salo
- Merged with Salo: January 1, 2009

Government
  - City manager: Simo Paassilta

Area
  - Total: 357.31 km^{2} (137.96 sq mi)
  - Land: 356.79 km^{2} (137.76 sq mi)
  - Water: 0.52 km^{2} (0.20 sq mi)
  - Rank: 260th

Population (2003)
  - Total: 9,374
  - Rank: 112th
  - Density: 26.27/km^{2} (68.05/sq mi)
- +1.4 % change
- Time zone: UTC+2 (EET)
  - Summer (DST): UTC+3 (EEST)
- Official languages: Finnish
- Urbanisation: 68.4%
- Unemployment rate: 8.7%
- Climate: Dfb
- Website: http://www.halikko.fi/

Halikko (Finnish pronunciation: [ˈhɑlikːo]) is a former municipality of Finland that existed until December 31, 2008. On January 1, 2009, the municipality was merged with the larger neighboring Salo. Before the merge Halikko had become a rapidly urbanizing rural area.

It was located in the province of Western Finland and was part of the Southwest Finland region. The municipality had a population of 9,491 (2004-12-31) and covered an area of 357.31 km^{2} (excluding sea) of which 0.52 km^{2} was inland water. The population density was 26.60 inhabitants per km^{2}.

The municipality was unilingually Finnish.

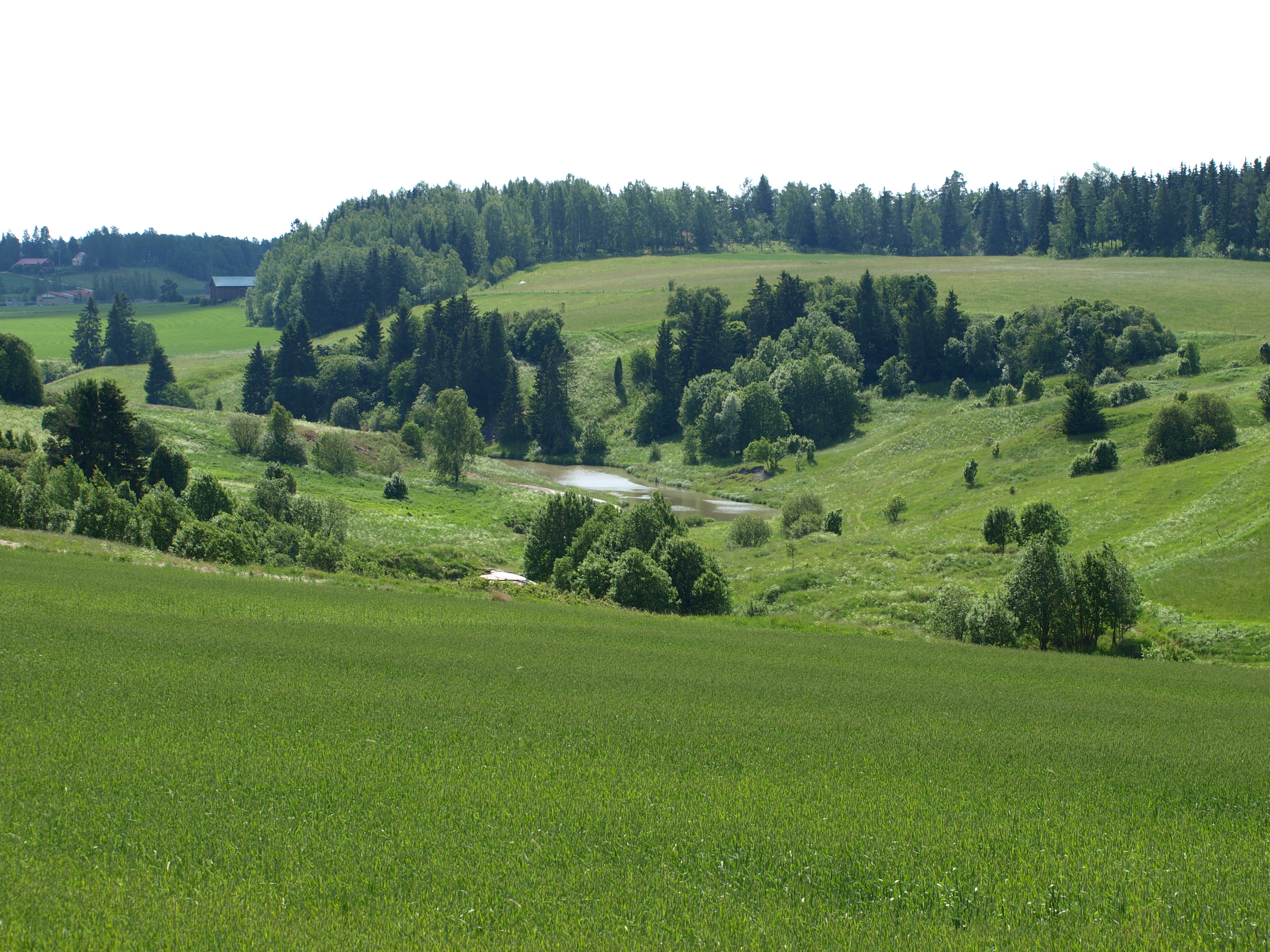
The valley of Halikko River

== History ==
There is evidence that areas in Halikko has been settled in the Stone Age. One of the prehistoric villages, Rikala, became an important trade and meeting place on the Finnish coast during the Iron Age. The vikings sailed to Rikala to trade with the finns. Several Iron Age treasures has been found in Halikko, e.g. the Treasure of Halikko.

In the first centuries of the Swedish rule in Finland, the land was given to the ruling class. Manors of Åminne, Vuorentaka and Wiurila were founded and they became powerful owners in Halikko. The oldest documented record of Halikko is from 1313. The stone church of Halikko was built in 1440.

The municipality of Halikko was formed in 1865 due to the municipal reform. The count of Wiurila became the first municipal manager. In 1932 Halikko had to give land to its growing neighbour Salo. In 1967 the municipality of Angelniemi was merged with Halikko.

On January 1, 2009, Halikko ceased to exist as it was attached to the City of Salo. The territory of the former Halikko thus changed status from rural to urban.

== Name ==
The name Halikko is mentioned for the first time in 1313. One theory is that the name derives from the Germanic name Halicho or Halik.

Saulo Kepsu has suggested that the toponym is Finnic in origin, being derived a possible pre-Christian personal name *Halikka or *Halikkoi, which would be derived from the verb haluta (to want).

== Notable people ==
- Count Arvid Bernhard Horn af Ekebyholm (1664 in Vuorentaka Manor – 1742) a Swedish general, diplomat and politician.

== See also ==
- Halikko Church
