= Kisko =

Coordinates: 60°15′55″N 23°26′50″E

- Former municipality
- Kiskon kunta Kisko kommun
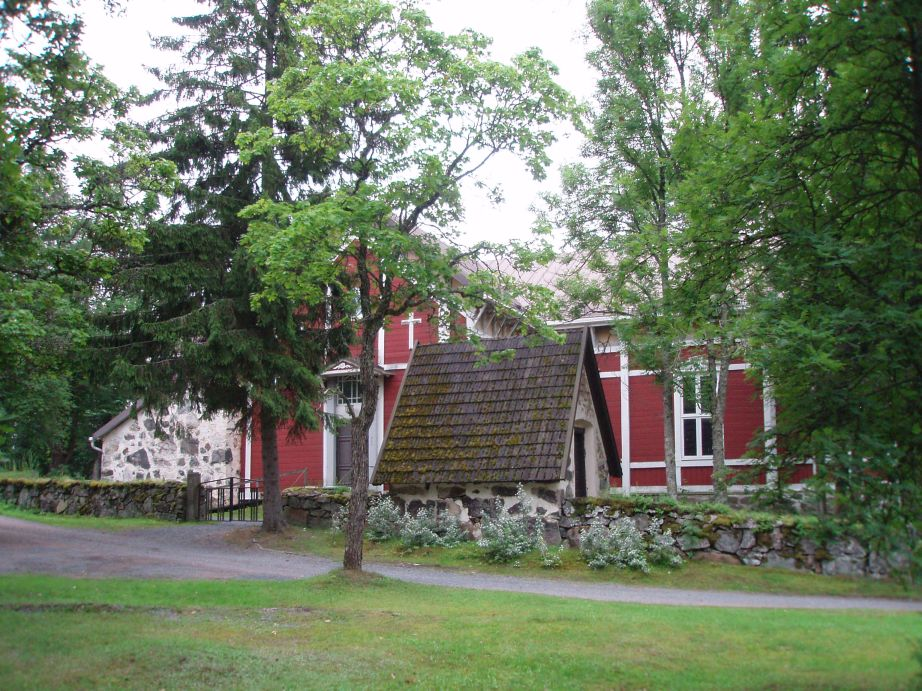
- Kisko church, built in 1810, apart from the sacristy which originates from medieval times

- Coat of arms

- Interactive map of Kisko
- Country: Finland
- Province: Western Finland
- Region: Southwest Finland
- Sub-region: Salo
- Merged into Salo: January 1, 2009

Government
  - City manager: Heimo Puustinen

Area
  - Total: 284.13 km^{2} (109.70 sq mi)
  - Land: 253.15 km^{2} (97.74 sq mi)
  - Water: 30.98 km^{2} (11.96 sq mi)
  - Rank: 289th

Population (2003)
  - Total: 1,912
  - Rank: 360th
  - Density: 7.553/km^{2} (19.56/sq mi)
- −1.4 % change
- Time zone: UTC+2 (EET)
  - Summer (DST): UTC+3 (EEST)
- Official languages: Finnish
- Urbanisation: 39.5%
- Unemployment rate: 10.3%
- Climate: Dfb
- Website: http://www.kisko.fi/

Kisko (Finnish pronunciation: [ˈkisko]) is a former municipality of Finland. It was consolidated with Salo on 1 January 2009.

It is located in the province of Western Finland and is part of the Southwest Finland region. The municipality had a population of 1,869 (2004-12-31) and covered an area of 284.13 km² of which 30.98 km² is water. The population density was 7.38 inhabitants per km².

The municipality was unilingually Finnish.

== History ==
Kisko was first mentioned in 1347, when it was a part of the parish of Pohja. It became an independent parish somewhere between the 1400s and the 1500s. At that time, the parish of Kisko also included Suomusjärvi, which became a separate parish in 1898.

Kisko was consolidated with Salo in 2009.
