= Michael A. Caligiuri =

American onocologist and academic

- Born: January 8, 1956 (age 70); Buffalo, New York
- Citizenship: American
- Education: SUNY Buffalo; Stanford University School of Medicine
- Known for: human natural killer cells
- Spouse: Ana Maria de Jesús Caligiuri
- Children: 3
- Awards: The J.E. Wallace Sterling Lifetime Achievement Award in Medicine Stanford University School of Medicine
- Scientific career
- Fields: oncology immunology
- Workplaces: Brigham and Women's Hospital; Dana–Farber Cancer Institute; Roswell Park Comprehensive Cancer Center; Ohio State University; City of Hope National Medical Center

Michael A. Caligiuri (born January 8, 1956) is an American physician scientist focused on oncology and immunology. He is currently the president of the City of Hope National Medical Center and the Deana and Steve Campbell Physician-in-Chief Distinguished Chair. He was elected president of the American Association for Cancer Research, the world's largest cancer research organization, for 2017–2018. He was previously the CEO of the James Cancer Hospital (2008-2017), Director of the Comprehensive Cancer Center (2003-2017), and Director of the Division of Hematology-Oncology (2000-2008) at the Ohio State University. He was elected to the United States National Academy of Medicine in 2018.

== Early life and education ==
Caligiuri was born in Buffalo, N.Y. on January 8, 1956, to Michael Angelo Caligiuri and Louise Rita (Mutignani) Caligiuri. He is the second of their 10 children. He is of Italian descent. His four grandparents, each uneducated and impoverished, emigrated separately from southern Italy to Buffalo, NY between 1913 and 1920. Quirino and Nineta (DeMarzio) Mutignani emigrated from Spoltore, Italy. Quirino then worked as a steam pressor at the M. Wile and Company Factory Building. Rosario Caligiuri emigrated from Soveria Mannelli, Italy and performed urban labor and migrant work. Sebastiana (Giampaolo) Caligiuri emigrated from Accadia, Italy and was a migrant worker, as were their five children. Caligiuri's father was a salesman and his mother was a homemaker. He was raised in a strict Catholic household. He attended Blessed Sacrament Elementary School and St. Joseph's Collegiate Institute for high school. He majored in humanities and health science at the State University of New York at Buffalo while living at home. He graduated summa cum laude and Phi Beta Kappa. Caligiuri, along with his siblings worked in a bingo hall every weekend at St. Colomba's Catholic Church in the inner city of Buffalo selling refreshments from the age of 8 until 21 to help with family and educational expenses. Caligiuri also worked as a janitor, house painter, and construction worker throughout high school, and as a waiter and wine steward to pay for college. Although there were no medical personnel in the family, Caligiuri always wanted to become a medical doctor.

In 1974, while a high school summer research student at Roswell Park Memorial Institute in Buffalo, N.Y. (now Roswell Park Comprehensive Cancer Center), Caligiuri won the Sydney Farber Award for Outstanding Research. The award was presented by Eugene Farber, MD, the brother of the late Sydney Farber and the Chairman of the Department of Dermatology at Stanford University School of Medicine. Dr. Farber invited Caligiuri to spend the following summer with him at Stanford University School of Medicine, marking the first time Caligiuri left Buffalo. Before completing college, Caligiuri also spent time studying humanities in Pisa, Italy. These two experiences proved to be invaluable in shaping Caligiuri's career aspirations and curiosity as he pursued a course of medicine and science.

Caligiuri applied to and was accepted at Stanford University School of Medicine in 1978 to pursue a degree in Medicine but without a means to pay for the education. He entered the 5-year medical scholars program (now called The Discovery Curriculum) that allowed him to work in a laboratory for 3 years of his pre-clinical training providing free tuition and living expenses for the 3 years, as well as offering free tuition for year 5, the second clinical clerkship training year. Caligiuri worked as a basic science researcher in the laboratory of Eugene Debs Robin, M.D. a pulmonologist and respiratory physiologist who was chief of the division of pulmonary medicine, acting chairman of the department of physiology, and in charge of the year-long physiology course in the school of medicine. Caligiuri studied the diving reflexes of seals, porpoises, and turtles for three years while completing his pre-clinical coursework, and spent the summers of 1978 and 1979 with Dr. Robin's lab at the Scripps Oceanographic Institute in La Jolla, CA. His first publications resulted from this experience. Caligiuri delivered the two lectures on the autonomic nervous system of the heart to the first year Stanford medical students from 1979 through 1982, and obtained his master's degree in physiology from the Stanford University School of Medicine in 1982. In 1983, his final year of medical school, Caligiuri was involved in successfully reversing the rejection of a transplanted kidney in a patient receiving what was then an experimental drug (cyclosporine). That single event inspired him to pursue immunology and clinical transplantation as a career. Following graduation from medical school in 1983 he next trained at Harvard in internal medicine at the Brigham and Women's Hospital (1983-1986) and in oncology, immunology and bone marrow transplantation at the Dana Farber Cancer Institute (1986-1989). Caligiuri published his first immunology paper from work he performed in the laboratory of his mentor, Jerome Ritz, MD on human natural killer cells or NK cells while working as a senior resident in internal medicine in 1985.

== Personal life ==
In 1983 Caligiuri met Ana Maria de Jesus Pou, a nutritionist at the Brigham and Women's Hospital originally from Ponce, Puerto Rico. They married in 1985 and have 3 children and 1 grandchild.

== Career ==
Caligiuri joined the faculty at Harvard Medical School following completion of his fellowship in the summer of 1989, but financial pressures quickly led him to the realization that he needed to move. In the fall of 1989 he was recruited to Roswell Park Memorial Institute in Buffalo, N.Y. (now Roswell Park Comprehensive Cancer Center) as an assistant professor by Clara D. Bloomfield, MD who subsequently became his life-long mentor. He had success in the clinic and the laboratory and rose to a full professor in seven years. In 1997 Caligiuri moved with Bloomfield and her husband, Albert de la Chapelle, MD, PhD to Ohio State University as the associate director for clinical research in the OSU comprehensive cancer center (OSUCCC) and co-director of the division of hematology-oncology. He was appointed as the director of the division of hematology-oncology from 2003 to 2007 and in 2005 succeeded Bloomfield as director of the OSUCCC until 2017. In 2007, Caligiuri was also appointed CEO of OSU's James Cancer Hospital until 2017. During his tenure Caligiuri recruited over 300 cancer physicians and researchers; the OSUCCC received a perfect score on peer-review from the National Cancer Institute (the first ever for a matrix CCC in the USA); and he oversaw the construction of a new James Cancer Hospital, the third largest cancer hospital in the USA. Caligiuri stepped down as director of the OSUCCC and CEO of the James Cancer Hospital in December 2017. In February 2018 Caligiuri was appointed as the president of the City of Hope National Medical Center and the Deana and Steve Campbell Physician-in-Chief Distinguished Chair.

== Research ==
Caligiuri is a physician – scientist whose basic laboratory work for 35 years has focused on understanding the role of human natural killer cells or NK cells in defense against cancer and infection. He trained in human immunology at the Dana Farber Cancer Institute in the laboratory of Jerome Ritz, from 1987 to 1989, focused exclusively on NK cells. The Caligiuri laboratory has published over 400 original peer-reviewed publications on NK cells and/or cancer and has numerous patents relating to immunology. Pivotal discoveries from the Caligiuri laboratory contributed to bringing chimeric antigen receptor (CAR) NK cells from the laboratory into the clinic for cancer therapy. These discoveries include proprietary retroviral transduction of human NK cells, the elucidation of the site, stages, cytokines and molecular mechanisms involved in the differentiation of human NK cells from CD34(+) hematopoietic stem cells, and the discovery of IL-15 as the key cytokine for human NK cell development, survival, growth, and activation. These three discoveries alone have been critical for the genesis of CAR NK cells from peripheral blood, umbilical cord blood and induced pluripotent stem cells (iPSCs). All of this work was accomplished with his predoctoral and postdoctoral students as well as his former postdoctoral student and now long-term collaborator, Jianhua Yu, PhD. Caligiuri's research has been continually funding by the National Institute of Health for 32 years, including a MERIT award and an Outstanding Investigator Award. In 2018 Caligiuri received the J.E. Wallace Sterling Lifetime Achievement Award in Medicine from Stanford University, was elected as a fellow in the AACR Academy and was elected to the United States National Academy of Medicine for his work in immunology.

== Translational and Entrepreneurial Efforts ==
Dr. Caligiuri has designed and conducted clinical studies modulating NK cells for over 1,000 patients with cancer as well as AIDS. He co-founded CytoImmune Therapeutics, a clinical stage biopharmaceutical company in 2017 to bring NK cell therapies to patients. CytoImmune Therapeutics is the first cell therapy company established in Puerto Rico. Caligiuri also co-founded The Oncology Research Information Exchange Network in 2014, CancerBridge in 2014, and the Ohio State University Drug Development Institute in 2013.

== Education ==
Over 120 students have trained in the Caligiuri laboratories at Roswell Park Cancer Institute, The Ohio State University, and City of Hope. His students have received over 200 local, state, national or international awards for their research.

== Other ==
Upon being named CEO of The James Cancer Hospital in 2007, Caligiuri had the idea to start a grassroots bike event one weekend a year in Columbus, OH to raise money for cancer research at the OSUCCC. Together with Cindy Hilsheimer and Daniel Rosenthal, Caligiuri co-founded Pelotonia in 2008, with the first ride occurring in 2009. In its first 13 years, Pelotonia has raised over $236 million for cancer research. 100% of all participant-raised funds go toward innovative cancer research.

== Honors and awards ==
- elected to the American Institute for Medical and Biological Engineering 2022
- elected to the National Academy of Medicine, 2018
- elected president, American Association for Cancer Research (2017-2018)
- elected fellow, American Association for Cancer Research Academy (2018)
- recipient J.E. Wallace Sterling Lifetime Achievement Award in Medicine Stanford University School of Medicine
- elected president, Society for Natural Immunity 2015–2018
- elected chair, National Cancer Policy Forum, Institute of Medicine (2014–2016)
- recipient, National Cancer Institute R35 Outstanding Investigator Award 2016
- elected member, AACR board of directors (2013–2016)
- recipient, National Cancer Institute Director's Service Award (2012)
- elected councillor and executive committee member, American Society of Hematology (2011–2015)
- recipient, MERIT Award, National Cancer Institute (2010)
- elected president, Association of American Cancer Institutes (2009–2011)
- appointed chairperson, 100th AACR Annual Meeting (2009)
- appointed member, Board of Scientific Advisors, National Cancer Institute (2008–2012)
- elected fellow, Alpha Omega Alpha Honor Medical Society (2008)
- recipient, John Wayne Clinical Research Award, Society of Surgical Oncology (2008)
- elected member, Association of American Physicians (2004)
- elected fellow, American Association for the Advancement of Science (2003)
- recipient, Emil J Freireich Award in Clinical Cancer Research, University of Texas MD Anderson Cancer Center (1999)
- elected member, American Society for Clinical Investigation (1998)
- elected fellow, American College of Physicians (1998)
