= Finnish national road 52 =

Road in Finland

Highway 52
- Kantatie 52 (Finnish); Stamväg 52 (Swedish)
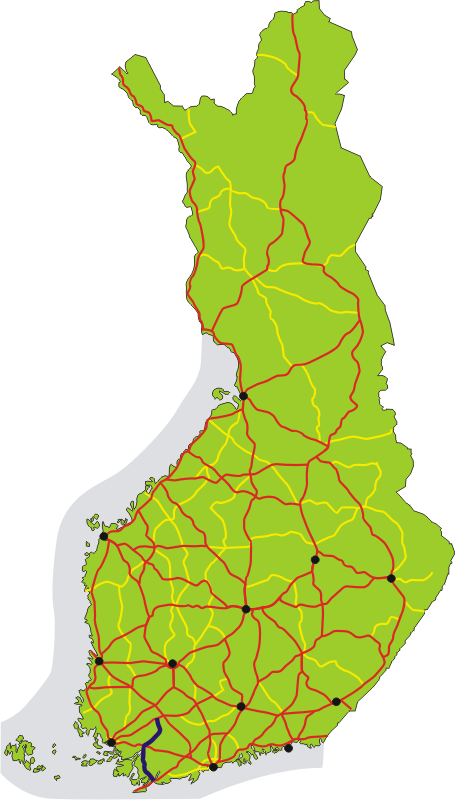

Route information
- Maintained by the Finnish Transport Agency
- Length: 111 km (69 mi)
- Existed: 1938–present

Major junctions
- From: Raseborg
- To: Jokioinen

Location
- Country: Finland
- Major cities: Salo; Somero

Highway system
- Highways in Finland
← Kt 51	→ Kt 53

The Finnish national road 52 (Finnish: Kantatie 52; Swedish: Stamväg 52) is the 2nd class main route between the city of Raseborg and the municipality of Jokioinen in southwest part of Finland. It runs overall 111 kilometers from the Ekenäs town in Raseborg passing through the town centers of Salo and Somero to the Haapaniemi village and national road 10 in Jokioinen.

== History ==
In the 1938 numbering system, main road 52 was the main route from Ekenäs to Salo. This section is still on its original route, running along or next to the King's Road, although it was rebuilt in the 1960s and 1970s. The section from Salo to Somero was built in the 1960s and was originally numbered as regional road 240. The section from Somero to Haapaniemi in Jokioinen was formerly part of national road 2. Following a reroute of road 2, this section became road 2803. In the 1996 renumbering, roads 240 and 2803 became part of national road 52.

In 2010, a roundabout was constructed at the intersection of regional road 183 near Perniö.

== Route ==
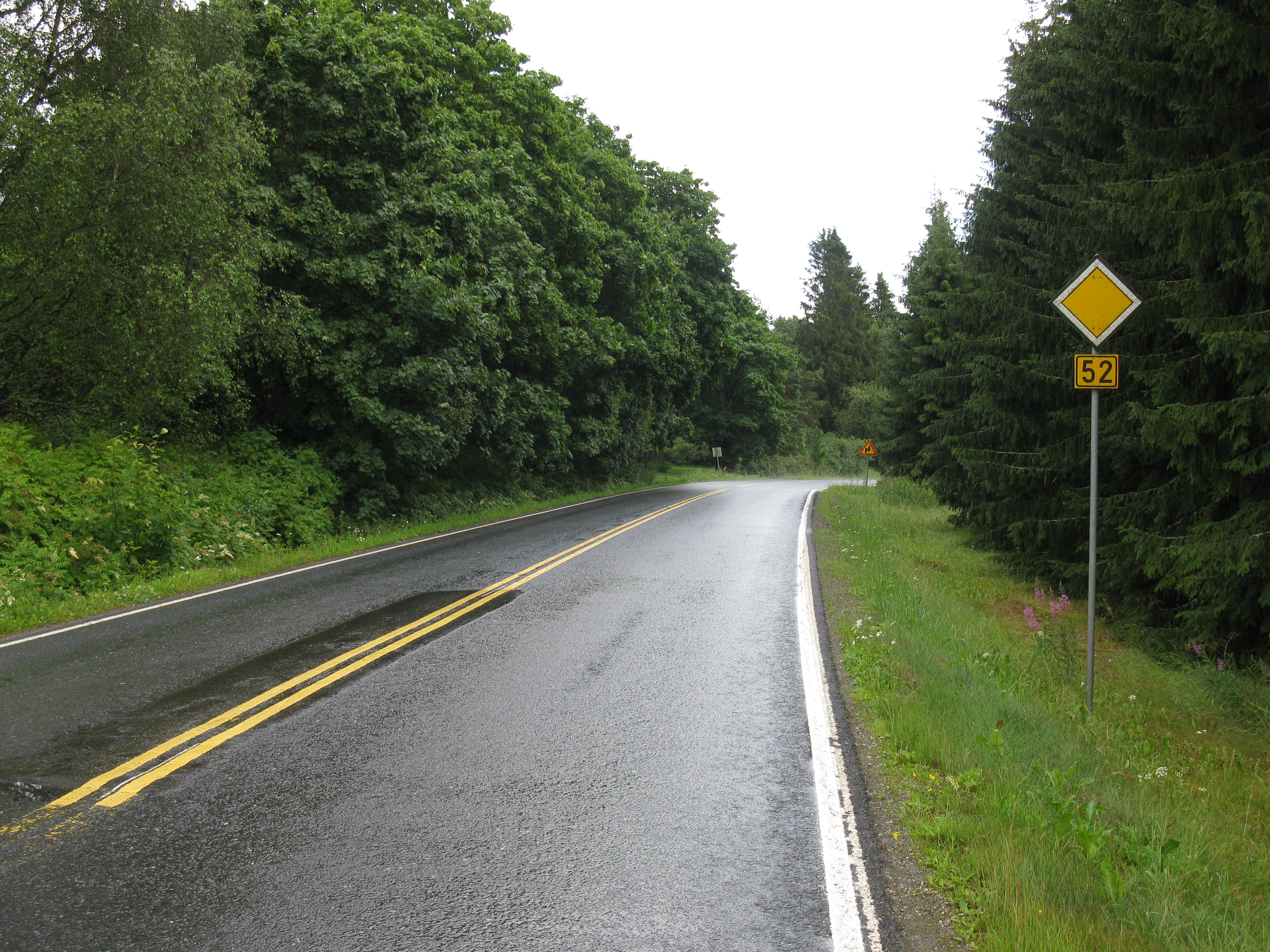
The main road's forest landscape in Paltta, Somero.

The road passes through the following localities:

- Raseborg (Ekenäs, Gennarby, Tenala and Olsböle)
- Salo (Pakapyöli, Perniö, Salo, Pohjankylä, Veitakkala and Pertteli)
- Somero (Somero, Sylvänä, Paltta and Koivumäki)
- Jokioinen (Haapaniemi)
