= Albert de la Chapelle =

Finnish human geneticist (1933–2020)

- Born: 11 February 1933; Helsinki, Finland
- Died: 10 December 2020 (aged 87); Helsinki, Finland
- Education: University of Helsinki
- Known for: Genetics of hereditary colorectal cancer and Lynch syndrome.
- Spouse(s): 1. Annikki Maria Åström; 2. Clara D. Bloomfield (c. 1984-2020; her death)
- Scientific career
- Workplaces: University of Helsinki, Ohio State University
- Website: medicine.osu.edu

Albert Fredrik de la Chapelle, MD, Ph.D (11 February 1933 – 10 December 2020) was a Finnish human geneticist, long-time head of Finland's first Department of Medical Genetics at the University of Helsinki, and subsequently professor of Human Cancer Genetics at Ohio State University. He was best known for his role in the elucidation of the genetics of hereditary colorectal cancer and Lynch syndrome.

== Biography ==
=== Personal life and education ===
Albert de la Chapelle was born in 1933, Helsinki, one of three sons (along with Claës-Henrik and Gustaf) of Claës Carl Fredrik René de la Chapelle (1900–1974) and Stina Serlachius (1902–1984). He spent his early childhood on his parents' apple growing estate. He attended school locally, transferring later to high school in Helsinki. Graduating from high school in 1950 he enrolled directly into medical school at the University of Helsinki, obtaining his MD in 1957 after a hiatus to complete 11 months of military service resulting in the rank of lieutenant. He then worked on his PhD graduating from the University of Helsinki in 1962. He was board certified in internal medicine and clinical genetics in Finland.

De la Chapelle was married to Clara D. Bloomfield.

=== Career ===
De la Chapelle worked for two years in the biochemistry lab of Dr. Paul Marks at Columbia University, New York, 1966–1968; for a semester in the Blood Group Unit of Ruth Sanger and Rob Race at the University of London 1974, and a year in the molecular genetics lab of Dr. Jean-Claude Kaplan at the University of Paris 1981–82. He held Finland's first Chair in Medical Genetics at the University of Helsinki between 1974 and 1997, when he moved to Ohio State University with the aim of building a Human Cancer Genetics Program. He held a chair in Human Cancer Genetics in the program which comprises greater than 20 faculty and greater than 200 total personnel. De la Chapelle was married to Dr. Clara D. Bloomfield, an expert on leukemia.

=== Contributions to science ===
==== Genetics of sex determination ====
De la Chapelle was in clinical training in endocrinology when a paper appeared in 1959 describing the loss of an X chromosome (45,X) in Turner's syndrome. He founded the first human cytogenetics laboratory in Finland and at first concentrated on the cytogenetics of Turner's syndrome. It turned out that in addition to 45,X, structural abnormalities of the single X chromosome were commonly involved, as well as mosaicism. Genotype/phenotype correlations were described. The resulting publication became de la Chapelle's first breakthrough publication and also his Ph.D. thesis on the cytogenetics in Turner syndrome; at that time it was the most extensive study in the field.

==== XX male syndrome (de la Chapelle syndrome) ====
Targeting abnormalities affecting sex determination, de la Chapelle published the first example of a male with the karyotype 46,XX. This was the first step towards the establishment of the XX male syndrome. It is now referred to by OMIM as 46,XX sex reversal 1, abbreviated SRXX1, OMIM #400045 (http://omim.org). Obviously XX males might provide valuable insight into sex determination genes and mechanisms that were unknown at the time. De la Chapelle worked with Finnish, French and US geneticists to solve the mystery of maleness without a Y. In the period between 1964 and 1990 he authored 45 peer-reviewed articles on the subject of sex determination. In the end it was detected (i) that the X and Y chromosomes share a tiny pseudoautosomal region that pairs and recombines in meiosis, (ii) that most XX males arise as a consequence of accidental unequal recombination in the paternal meiosis, transferring the male-determining region from the Y to the X). Soon after this discovery, the male determining gene SRY was cloned (by others).

==== de la Chapelle dysplasia ====
In 1972 a rare novel recessively inherited lethal skeletal dysplasia characterized by extreme micromelia (short limbs) was described. The underlying mutation, homozygosity for p.T512K in the "SLC26A2" gene was later found to be responsible for the syndrome. The syndrome is called "de la Chapelle dysplasia" (DLCD; OMIM #256050). An alternative name is Atelosteogenesis type 2.

==== Linkage mapping and positional cloning of disease-causing genes ====
De la Chapelle decided to begin to clarify the genetic basis of some 30 disorders (most recessively inherited) that were known to be greatly over-represented in the Finnish population due to its founder nature, i.e., the present population derives from a small number of settlers without significant recent influx. The diseases are said to comprise the "Finnish Disease Heritage". The de la Chapelle laboratory soon was transformed into a molecular genetics one working mainly with restriction fragment length polymorphisms as markers. Prominent use of the strong linkage disequilibrium patterns was an important tool. Disease after disease was mapped to critical genomic intervals. By positional cloning the culpable genes were identified based on the occurrence of pathogenic mutations. The number of diseases studied is approximately 24, including a few "non-Finnish" disorders such as Peutz–Jeghers syndrome, and a few in which the de la Chapelle group mapped the region but the gene was found by others. These extensive findings were published between approximately 1987 (Choroideremia, a "Finnish" disorder), and 2011 (MOPD1 disease in the Ohio Amish).

==== The genetic basis of Lynch Syndrome ====
Dr. Henry Lynch's name is attached to a condition, Lynch Syndrome (formerly Hereditary Nonpolyposis Colorectal Cancer, HNPCC), characterized by a greatly increased risk of colorectal and endometrial cancer, plus a moderately increased risk of ~7 other cancers. In 1992 collaborations between Finnish, US, New Zealand and Canadian researchers had led to the study of 2 exceptionally large families favorable for linkage analysis. Genotyping these in Helsinki led to a breakthrough; convincing linkage was found to a locus on chromosome 2p which was subsequently shown to harbor the MSH2 gene.

This for the first time proved that Lynch syndrome exists as a Mendelian disorder. In addition, tumors from these families were shown to display greatly reduced DNA repair, nowadays referred to and measured as microsatellite instability (MSI) or mismatch repair deficiency.

This paper was the first of 3 early descriptions of microsatellite instability, representing a major breakthrough with translational consequences. In addition it established the link between microsatellite instability and the hereditary form of colorectal cancer. In 2015, two decades later, Dr. de la Chapelle co-authored a paper describing dramatic results of therapy with anti-PD-1 antibodies in patients with microsatellite unstable tumors. The mapping of MSH2 and the detection of MSI led to an avalanche of research targeting the presumptive human homologs of already known yeast mismatch repair genes. In the end, 4 mismatch repair genes were cloned and shown to cause Lynch syndrome: MSH2 (2p), MLH1 (3p); MSH6 (2p) and PMS2 (7p). Dr. de la Chapelle's group contributed to the cloning and characterization of these genes. The unraveling of Lynch syndrome has had and will have important implications because morbidity and mortality can be substantially reduced in mutation-positive individuals through clinical surveillance and interventions. It is estimated that some 30,000 new cases of LS would be detected each year in the US provided all at-risk family members of affected individuals were screened for the proband's mutation. Such screening is increasingly practiced in numerous institutions and hospitals around the globe.

==== Genes predisposing to thyroid cancer ====
Beginning in 1997 a main component of de la Chapelle's research has centered on detecting and annotating gene mutations that predispose to thyroid cancer, TC. Relying on ample experience from work with the Finnish Disease Heritage (see above) the de la Chapelle laboratory has used linkage and linkage disequilibrium analysis in search of genes with high penetrance. For genes with low penetrance, genome-wide association analysis (GWAS) has been carried out. Presently some 10 high-penetrance genes and some 15 low-penetrance variants have been found and annotated. It is becoming increasingly clear that many predisposing genes of high penetrance exist, but each is rare or ultra-rare.

Instead, single nucleotide polymorphisms and other variants of low penetrance account for most of the genetically determined risk. Ongoing research in the de la Chapelle lab aims at elucidating the functional aspects of the detected genes or variants. Ultimately, when up and downstream pathways are established, this information will inform research attempting to create drugs to treat TC. Moreover, the low-penetrance variants’ effects are additive, allowing the extent of genetic risk of TC to be predicted in individuals under study for TC. The de la Chapelle lab belongs to a large and active Thyroid Cancer Program at The Ohio State University. The clinical arm of the group is essential in providing crucial material for the laboratory experiments at hand. Moreover, with an active group of genetic counselors at OSU the acquisition and characterization of families with more than one member affected by TC is efficient and useful for genetic studies.

==== Gender in sports ====
De la Chapelle is one of the first scientists who rose to oppose the International Olympic Committee's (IOC) handling of the issue of gender verification in sports. In the 1960s there was negative publicity regarding certain athletes competing as females. Their appearance was said to be masculine and it was hypothesized that they were males masquerading as females. The IOC adopted a "gender verification" procedure that relied on typing female athletes for sex chromatin, a simple procedure.

It was obvious that some women would test "negative" for X chromatin even though they have no masculine traits at all. This group of women comprises individuals with the androgen insensitivity syndrome whose karyotype is 46,XY but whose anatomy is normal, and other conditions. They would "fail" the sex chromatin test and would not be allowed to compete as females. The IOC was unwilling to admit this mistake, which was unmasked in a landmark paper by de la Chapelle. Soon other scientists joined forces and after years of public and closed door argumentation the IOC finally abandoned the sex chromatin (and later SRY gene) testing. The issue of women with a masculine appearance (and muscle strength) due to congenital abnormalities of sex hormone metabolism requires detailed study of those rare individuals who are affected and who compete in sports.

=== Other activities ===
De la Chapelle had many interests beyond genetics. He grew up hunting and fishing, and as an adult he continued his devotion to nature. Skeet shooting became more than a hobby; he represented Finland in World Cups and other shooting competitions. His best result was a bronze medal in a European Championship.

De la Chapelle edited and co-authored three books that describe the history and sociology of three locations in which he lived. Den lilla boken om Kalby describes his summer house in Tenala, Finland, located about 1 km from his childhood home.

In Patricierhuset vid skvären the property at Bulevarden 10 in downtown Helsinki is described in great detail. De la Chapelle lived there between approximately 1941 and 1963. 8060 Olentangy River Road, Delaware, Ohio 43015 describes a property in Delaware County, Ohio, on the outskirts of Columbus.

De la Chapelle was also a patron of the arts. He started an art collection and foundation (Albert de la Chapelles Konststiftelse) dedicated to the construction of a museum in Ekenäs, which is to be donated to the city of Raseborg.

== Selected honours and awards ==
- Anders Jahre Prize for Medicine, University of Oslo, 1989
- Member, European Molecular Biology Organization (EMBO) 1989
- Honorary doctorates in medicine, University of Oulu, Finland 1994, University of Uppsala, Sweden 1995
- Mauro Baschirotto Award, European Society of Human Genetics, 2002
- William Allan Award, American Society of Human Genetics 2002
- Lifetime Achievement Award, the Collaborative Group of the Americas, 2017

== Academy memberships ==
- Finnish Society of Sciences and Letters 1975; honorary member 1991.
- Royal Swedish Academy of Sciences 1991.
- Academy of Finland 1997. First ever from the medical field
- National Academy of Sciences USA 1997.
