= Snappertuna =

- Former municipality
- Snappertunan kunta Snappertuna kommun
- Coat of arms

- Location of Snappertuna in Finland
- Interactive map of Snappertuna
- Location within Uusimaa Location within Finland Location within Europe
- Coordinates: 59°59′53.7″N 023°39′08.5″E
- Country: Finland
- Province: Uusimaa Province
- Established: 1865
- Merged into Ekenäs: 1977

Area
  - Land: 171.9 km^{2} (66.4 sq mi)

Population (1975-12-31)
  - Total: 1,373
  - Density: 7.987/km^{2} (20.69/sq mi)
- Official languages: Swedish

Snappertuna is a former municipality of Finland which was located in the province of Uusimaa. Snappertuna was consolidated with Ekenäs on 1 January 1977, except for a small area that was merged into Karis. Today Snappertuna is a part of Raseborg town formed in 2009.

Snappertuna houses the Raseborg Castle, a medieval castle after which the town of Raseborg is named.

The municipality was unilingually Swedish.
