= Raseborg Museum =

History museum in Uusimaa, Finland

Coordinates: 59.9736°N 23.4378°E

- Raseborgs museum
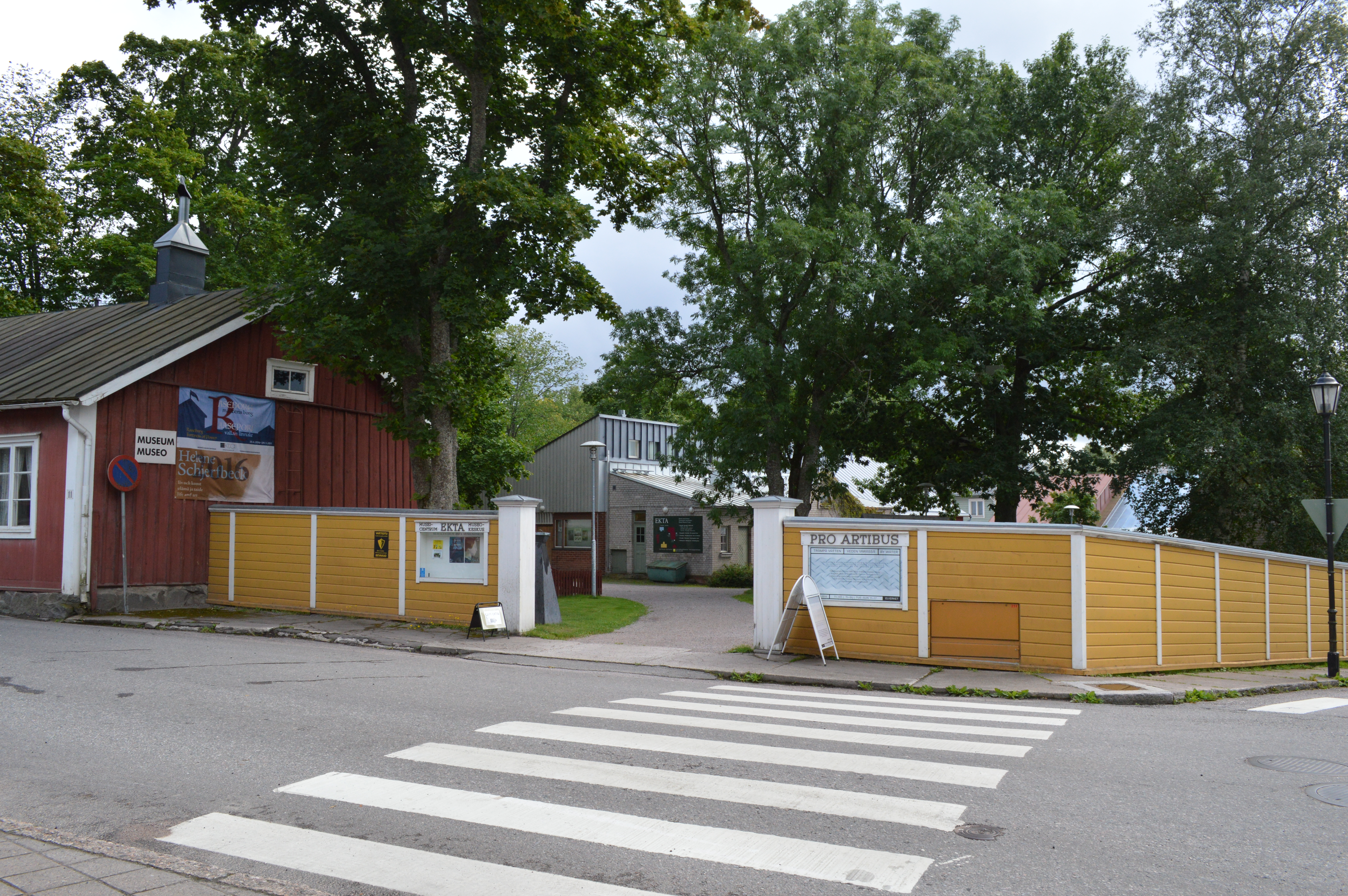
- Entrance to the museum area in Ekenäs.
- Established: 1906
- Location: Raseborg, Uusimaa, Finland
- Type: History museum, Regional responsibility museum
- Key holdings: Art of Helene Schjerfbeck
- Owner: The City of Raseborg
- Website: raseborgsmuseum.fi

Raseborg Museum (Swedish: Raseborgs museum, Finnish: Raaseporin museo) is a history museum and a regional responsibility museum for Western Uusimaa in Finland. The museum is located in Ekenäs in the city of Raseborg. Until 2006 the museum was known as Ekenäs Museum, which was founded in 1906.

Raseborgs Museum has two base exhibitions. One of the exhibitions showcases the history of Raseborg and with Western Uusimaa, while the other one focuses on the art of Helene Schjerfbeck.

A museum for contemporary art, Chappe, was completed by Raseborg Museum in 2023. Chappe was founded and built with the support of Albert de la Chapelle's foundation. Visitors can enter Raseborg Museum with the Finnish Museum Card.
