= Fredrik Stjernvall =

Finnish politician

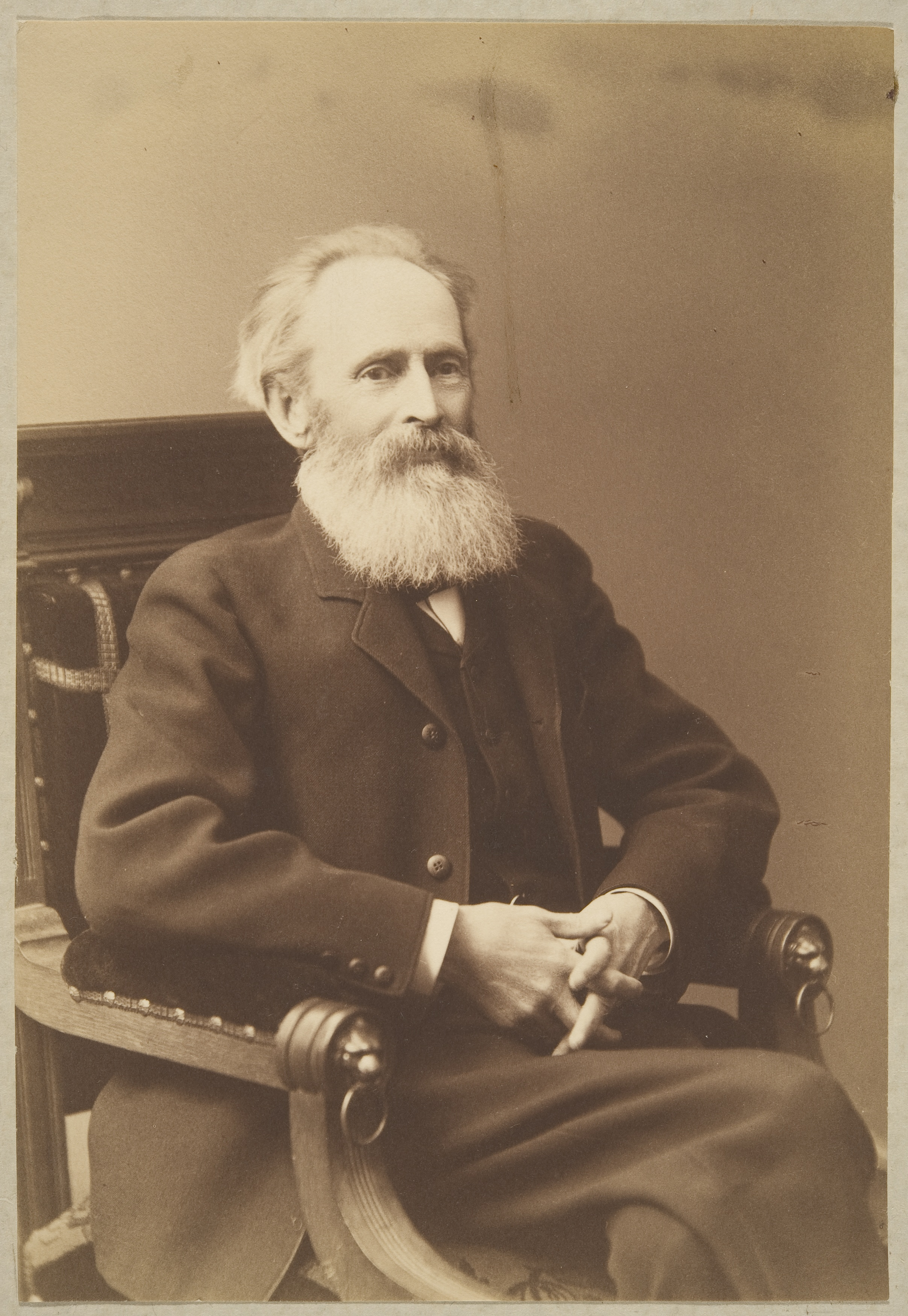
Fredrik Stjernvall

Fredrik Stjernvall (30 September 1845 – 26 January 1916) was a Finnish politician. He was born in Tenala, and was a member of the Senate of Finland.
