= Bromarv =

Bromarv Bromarv – Bromarv Bromarf
- Village (former municipality)
- Bromarv kommun Bromarvin kunta
- Coat of arms

- Location of Bromarv in Finland
- Interactive map of Bromarv
- Location within Uusimaa Location within Finland Location within Europe
- Coordinates: 59°59′30″N 23°02′00″E
- Country: Finland
- Region: Uusimaa
- Founded: 1865
- Consolidated: 1977

Area
  - Total: 197.00 km^{2} (76.06 sq mi)

Population (1973);
  - Total: 1,574
  - Density: 7.990/km^{2} (20.69/sq mi)
- Time zone: UTC+2 (EET)
  - Summer (DST): UTC+3 (EEST)
- Postal code: 10570
- Climate: Dfb
- Website: http://www.bromarv.fi

Bromarv (Finland Swedish: [ˈbroːmɑrv, ˈbruː-]; Finnish: Bromarv) is a village and former municipality of Finland. The municipality was consolidated to Tenala and Hanko in 1977. Since January 1, 2009 the village has been part of Raseborg. Bromarv was located in the province of Uusimaa and is part of the modern-day Uusimaa region. The port town of Hanko is located 15 kilometres (9.3 mi) south of Bromarv.

Area of Bromarv is classified as an archipelago-like mainland and the central village sits on a narrow isthmus. Other villages include Rilax and Vättlax. Villages of Täktom and Santala on Hanko Peninsula were also part of the municipality.

The town was bilingual, with the majority being Swedish speakers (91,7%).

It is noted for its archipelago, part of which is the Raseborgs västra skärgård.

The municipality is home to the historical Riilahti Manor and the Battle of Gangut War Memorials.

== History ==
Bromarv village had a single house in the 1560s. It formed a chapel parish in 1677 and it became an independent parish in 1865. The municipality of Bromarv was mostly merged with Tenala in 1977, but its southern parts on Hanko Peninsula were consolidated with Hanko. Later in the 1990s Tenala became part of Ekenäs as a result of a merger. Nowadays Bromarv is a part of Raseborg town founded in 2009.

== Sub-region of Uusimaa ==
Bromarv was also the name of a sub-region of Uusimaa, also known as Nyland.

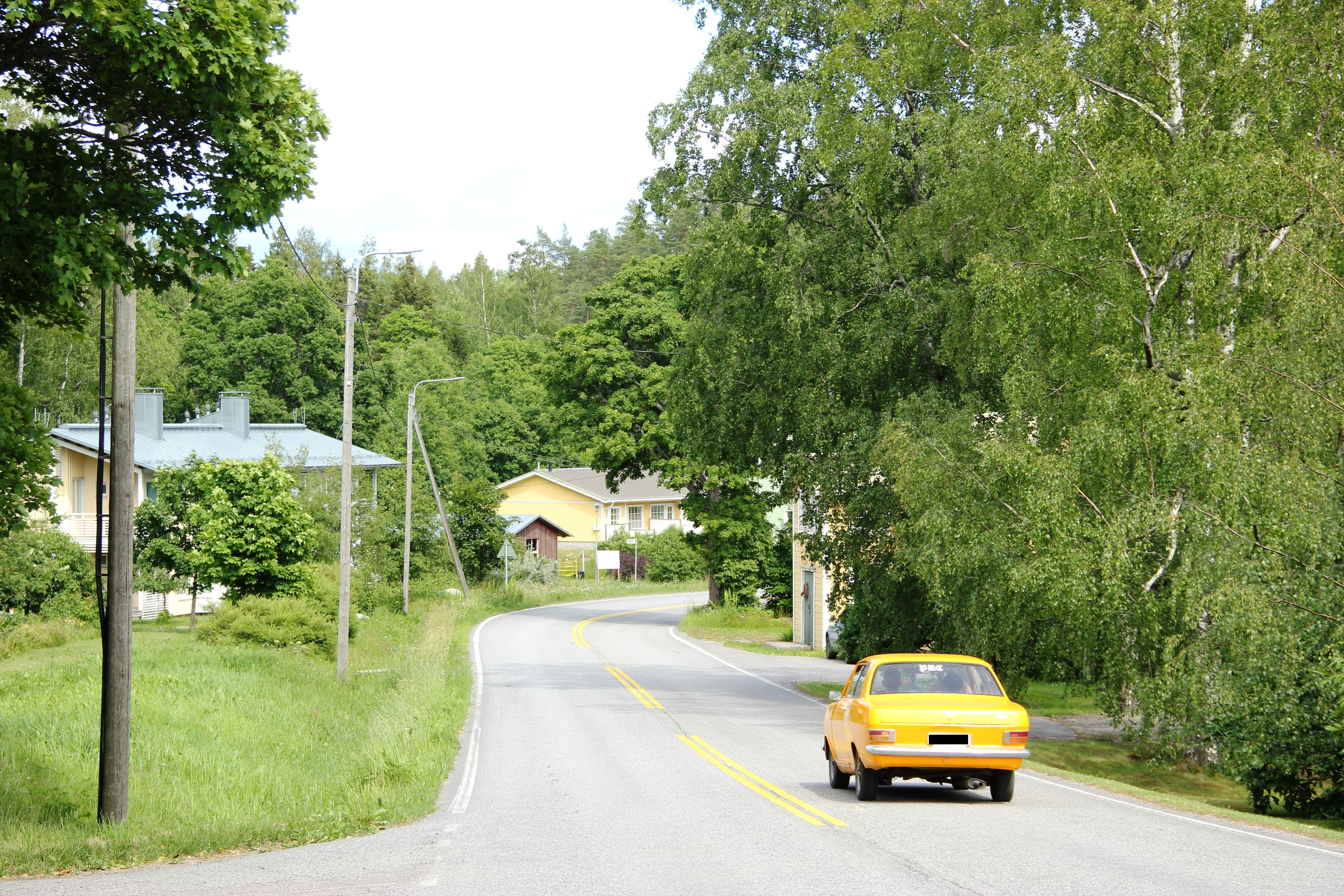
Road in Bromarv

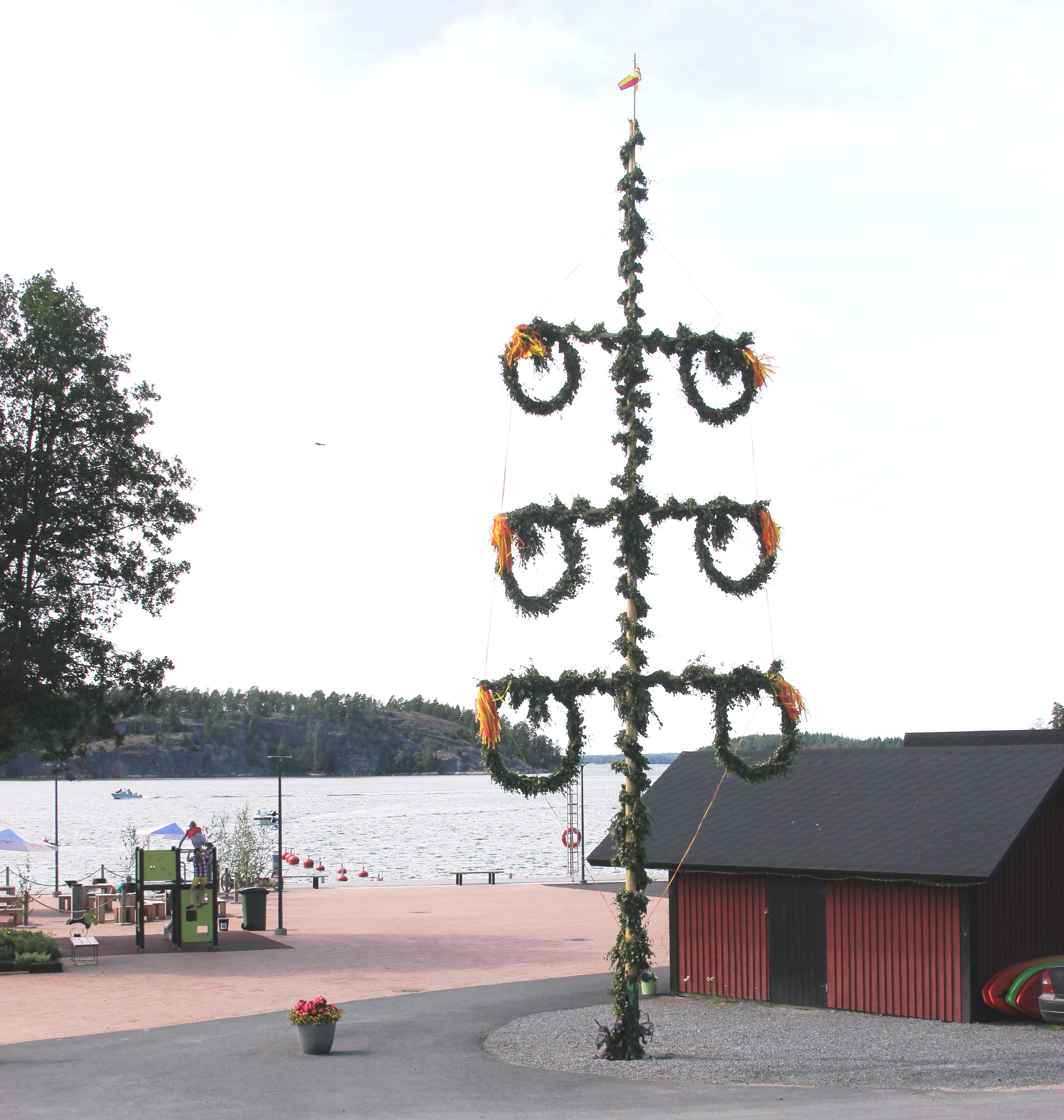
Midsummer pole in 2019 in Bromarv harbour

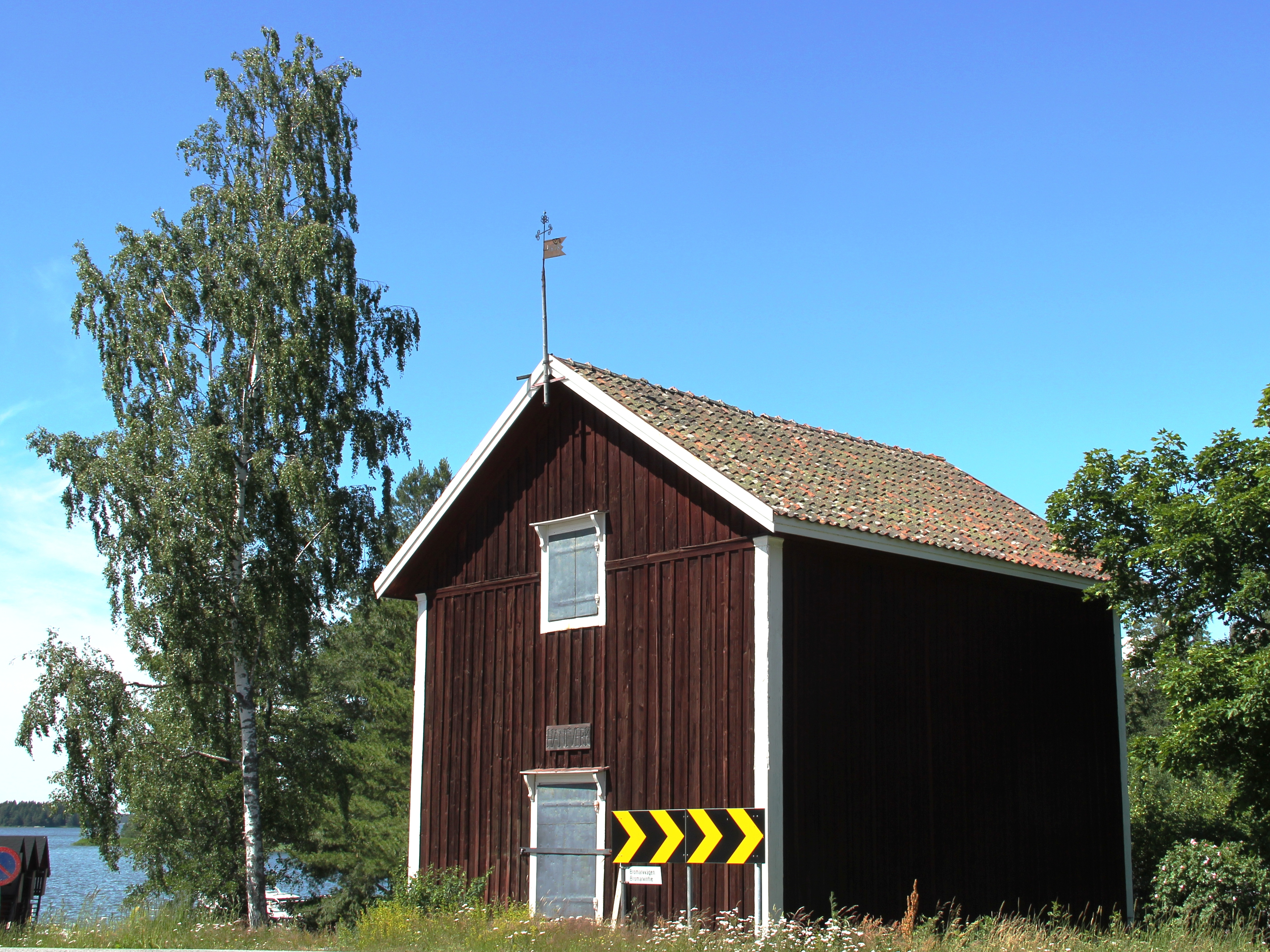
Bromarv parish granary built in 1878

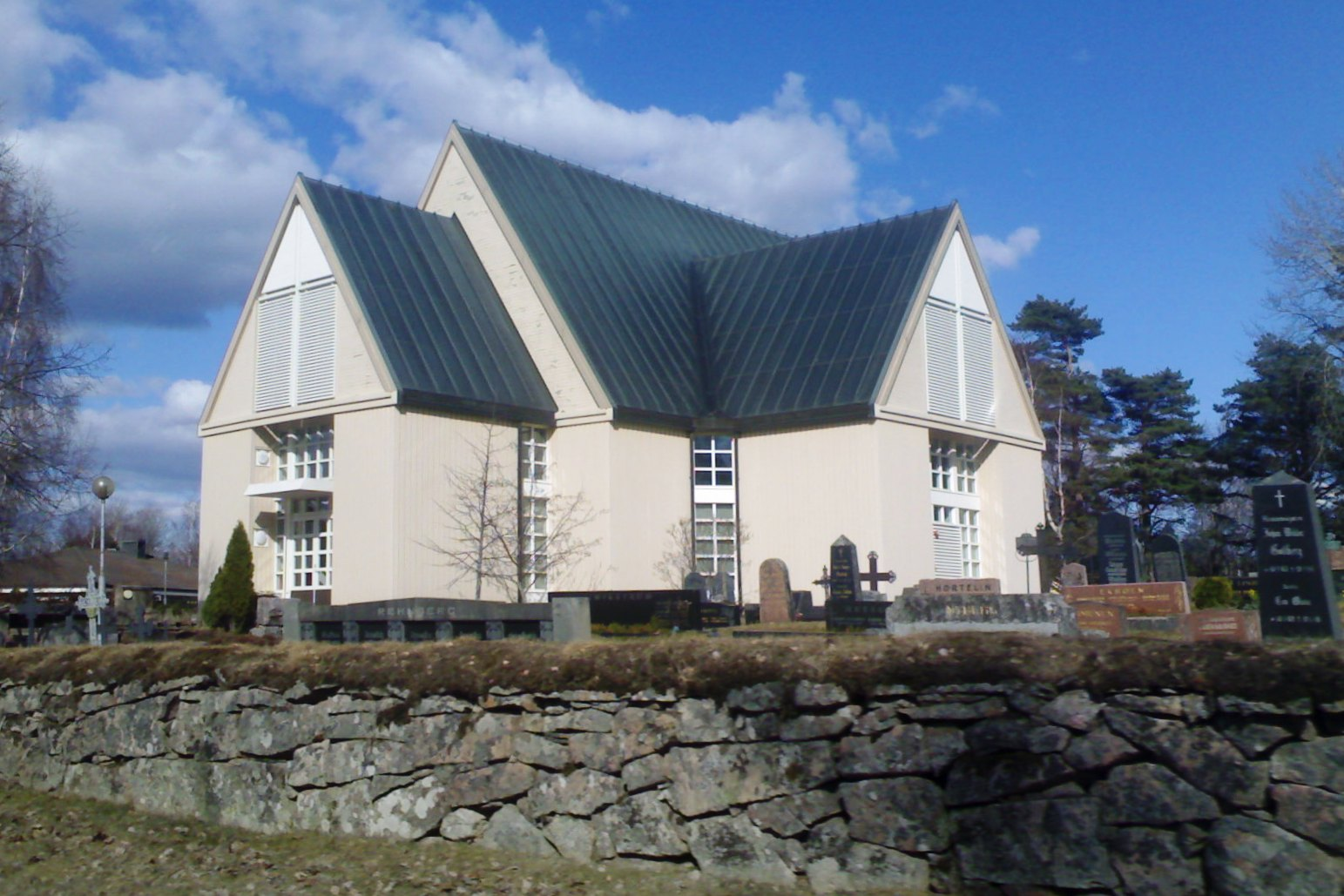
The new church, built in 1981 after the old one was burnt down
