= Ekenäs Church =

Coordinates: 59°58′26″N 23°26′01″E

- Ekenäs kyrka
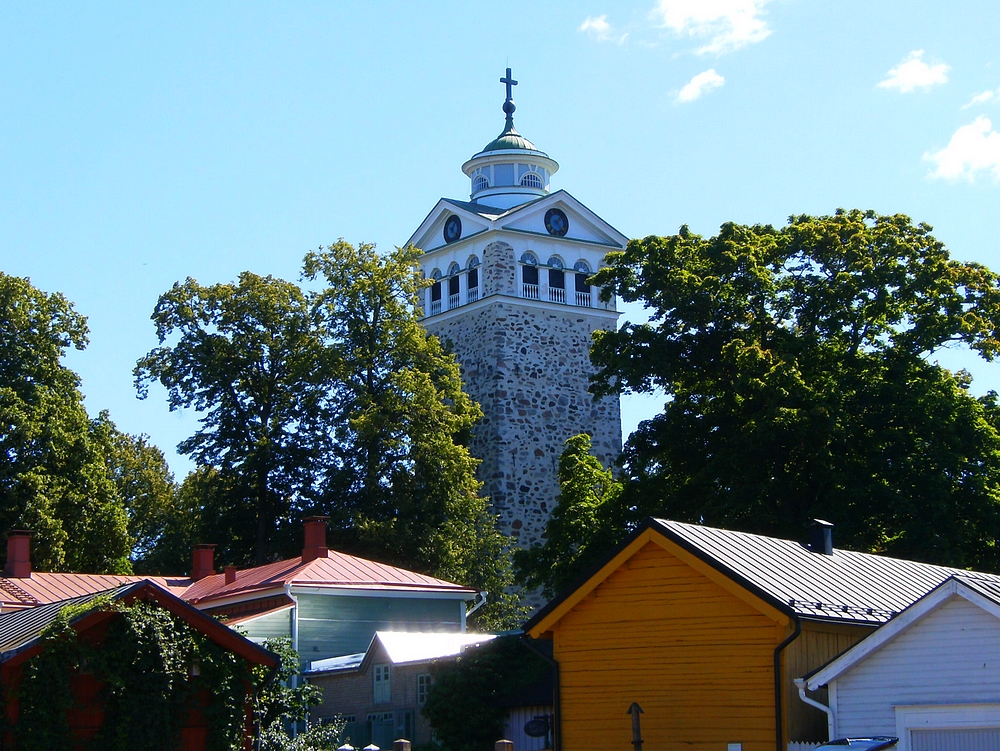
- The bell tower of Ekenäs Church
- Ekenäs Church
- Location: Ekenäs, Raseborg, Uusimaa
- Country: Finland
- Language: Swedish / Finnish
- Denomination: Lutheran
- Religious institute: Evangelical Lutheran Church of Finland

History
- Consecrated: 1660s

Architecture
- Heritage designation: Finnish Heritage Agency
- Architect: Charles Bassi (rebuilding)
- Architectural type: Neoclassical
- Years built: 1651-1670s
- Completed: 1670s

Specifications
- Length: 36 m (118 ft)
- Width: 17 m (56 ft)

Administration
- Diocese: Diocese of Borgå
- Parish: Ekenäsnejdens svenska församling

Ekenäs Church (Swedish: Ekenäs kyrka, Finnish: Tammisaaren kirkko) is a 17th-century neoclassical stone church located in Ekenäs in the Finnish town of Raseborg. Construction began in 1651 and continued into the 1670s. The initiative to build a stone church in Ekenäs came from earl Gustaf Adolf Leijonhufvud but the designer of the original Baroque church is unknown.

Ekenäs Church was ravaged by fire in 1821 and renovated by architect Charles Bassi between 1839 and 1842. The appearance of the church we see nowadays is designed by Bassi. There are seats for 560 people in Ekenäs Church.

Ekenäs Church is used by the Swedish-speaking parish of Ekenäs (Ekenäsnejdens svenska församling) which is part of Diocese of Borgå in the Evangelical Lutheran Church of Finland.

== History ==
In 1546, king Gustav Vasa of Sweden grants Ekenäs the right to become a town.

In 1589, earl Axel Leijonhufvud starts constructing a small wooden church in Ekenäs.

In 1600, Axel Leijonhufvud's younger brother Moritz Leijonhufvud completes the construction of the wooden church. Interest in a stone church increases during the 17th century.

In 1651, the construction of a stone church starts by the initiative of earl Gustaf Adolf Leijonhufvud. This same year, he dies due to wounds sustained in the Thirty Years' War. A memorial plate depicting earl Leijonhufvud and his wife Christina Catharina la Gardie can still be seen on the outer wall of the church.

In 1680, earl Leijonhufvud's son Gustav Mauritz Leijonhufvud completes the construction of Ekenäs stone church according to his father's will. The new church is built of granite, 36 meters (118 ft) long and 17 meters (56 ft) wide with walls 2 meters (6.6 ft) thick and a 31-meter-high (102 ft) bell tower.

In 1690, the old wooden church is demolished.

On 14 June 1821 at about 4 am, Ekenäs church catches fire which even reaches the wooden roof of the church. Only the altar piece and some items were saved from the fire. The church was rebuilt after the fire according to Charles Bassi's plans in neoclassical style. The rebuilding was completed by Anders Fredrik Granstedt. The new roof of Ekenäs church was 10 meters (33 ft) lower than the original, interior pillars were removed and new larger windows were opened.

In 1842, rebuilding of Ekenäs church is completed. The old baroque church represents now neoclassicism.

In 1957-1959, The stained glass windows by Karin Mazeitti-Slotte are moved to the northern side of the church. The windows were painted in 1924.

In 1987-1990, the church is restored and renovated. One of the stained glass windows is moved to the southern choir, the altar wall is masoned again and marmored. The tower of Ekenäs church is now 41.5 meters (136 ft) above sea level and 35.8 meters (117 ft) above ground level.

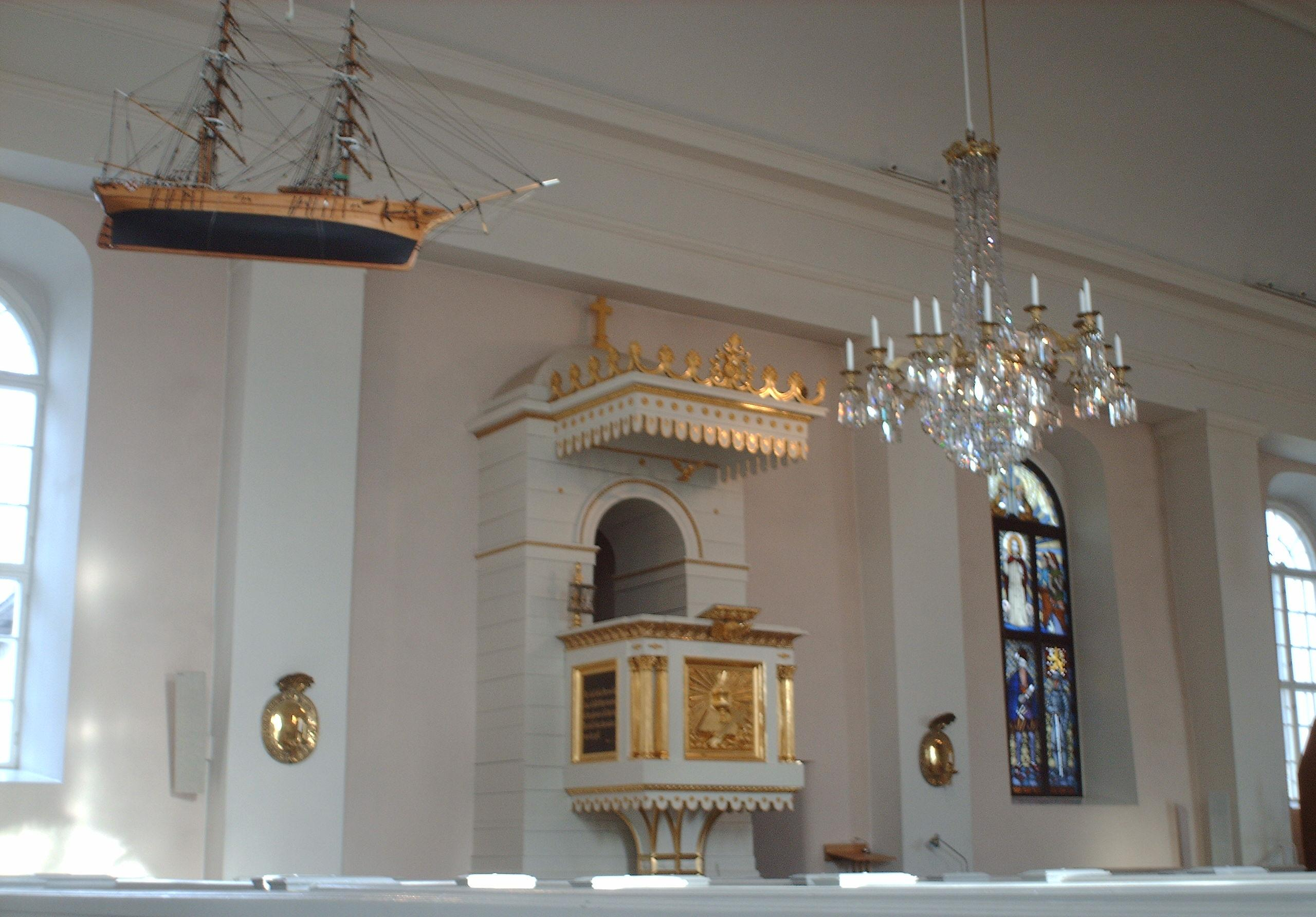
The pulpit

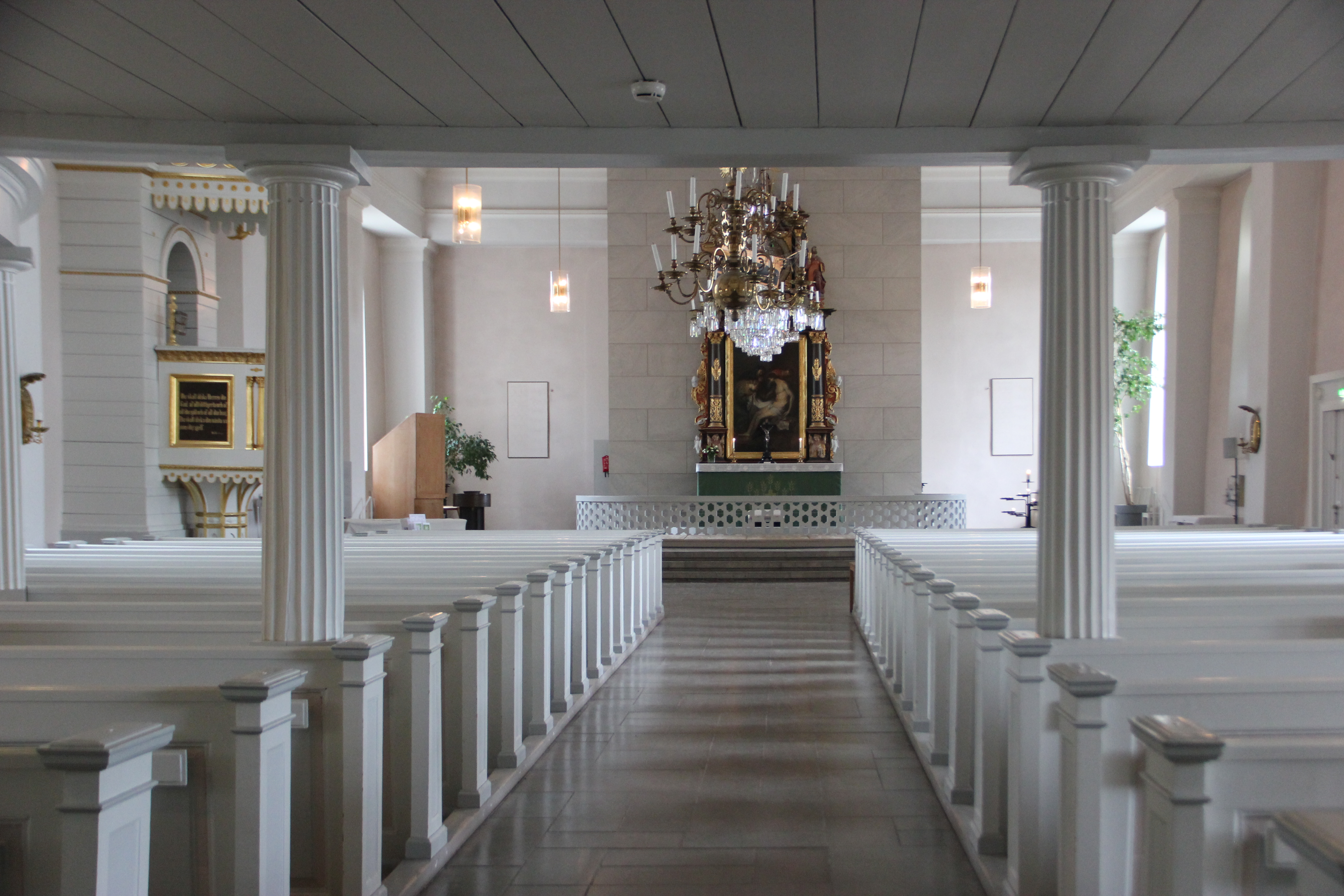
The central aisle

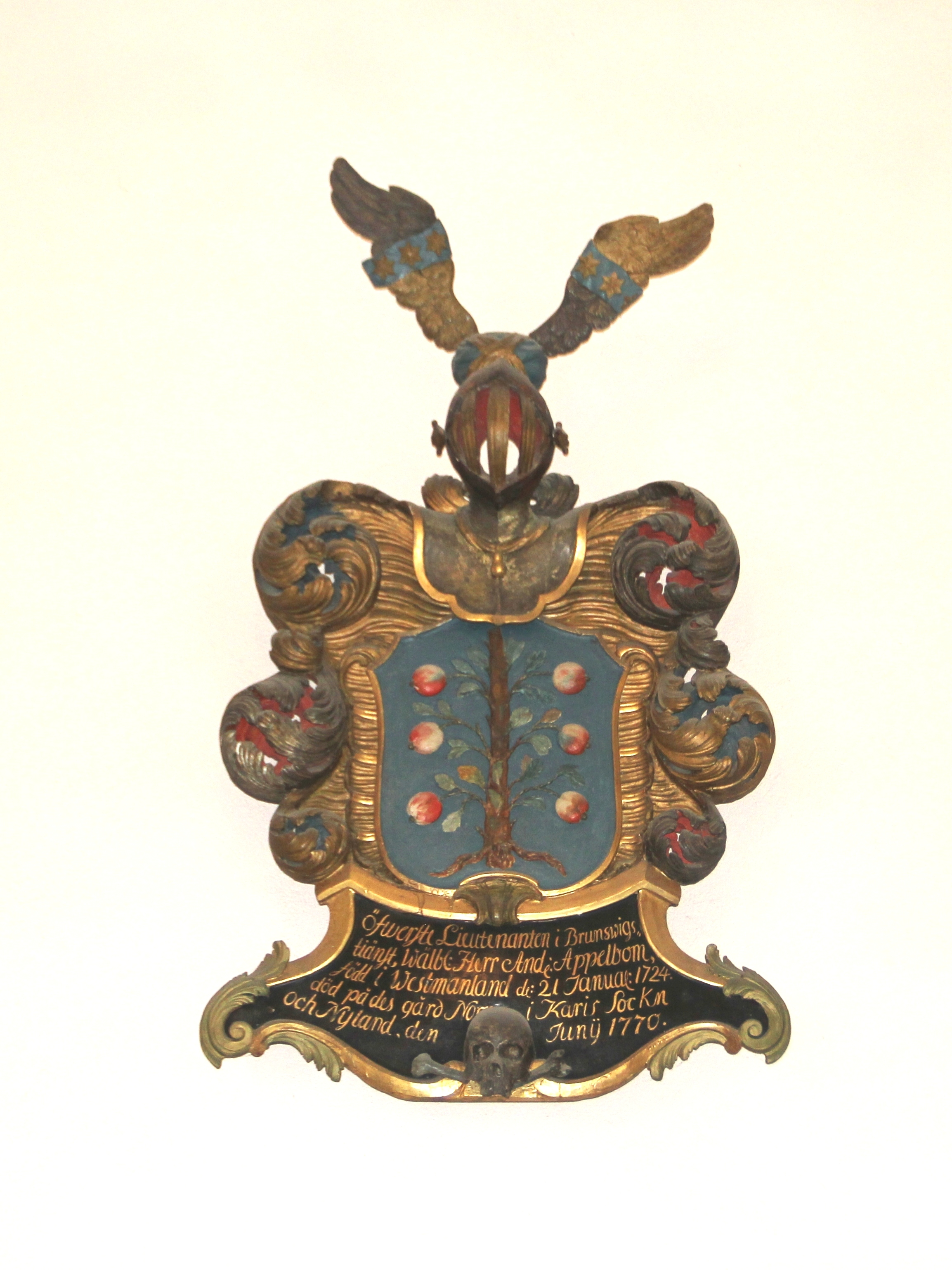
Coat of Arms on the church wall

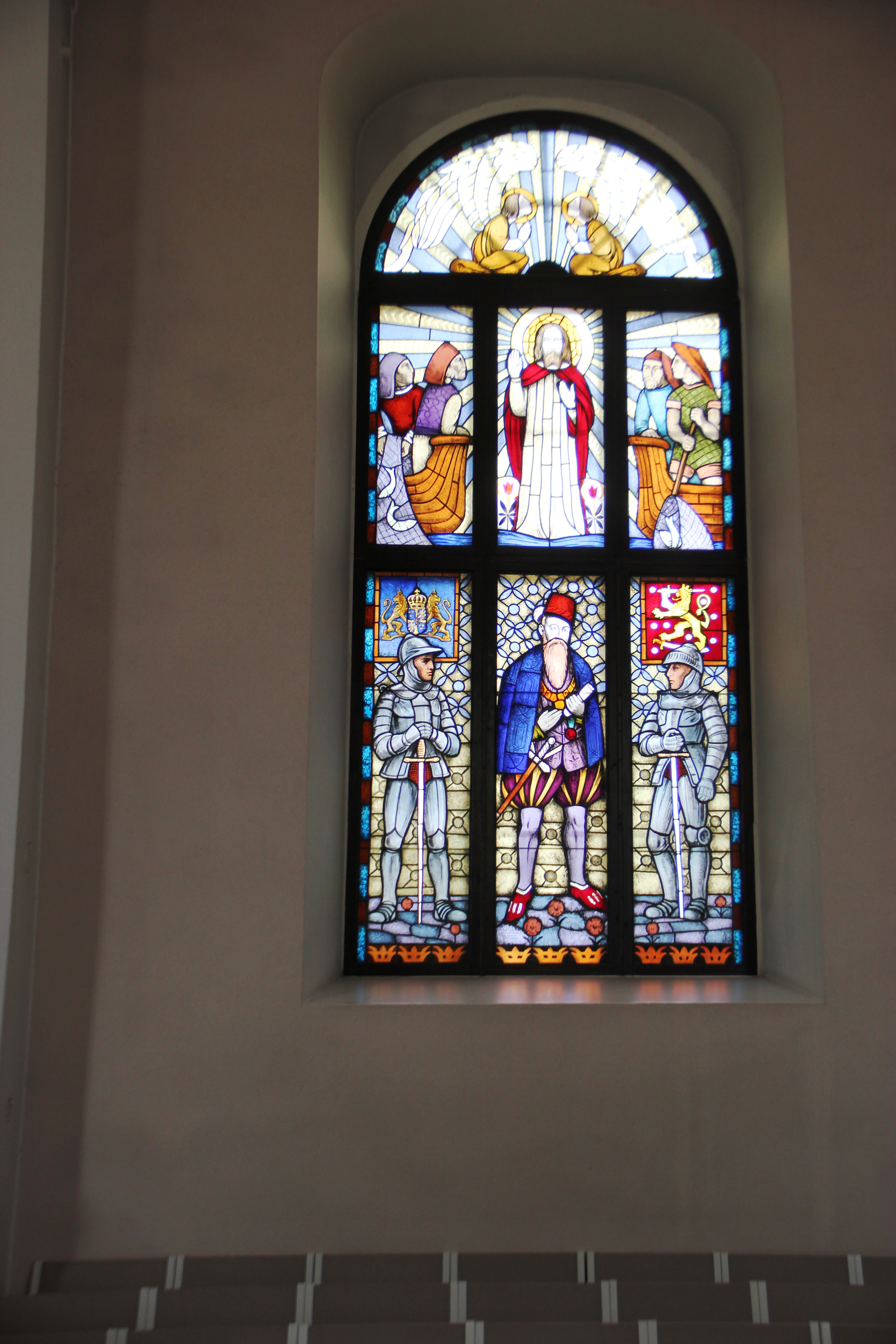
Stained glass window

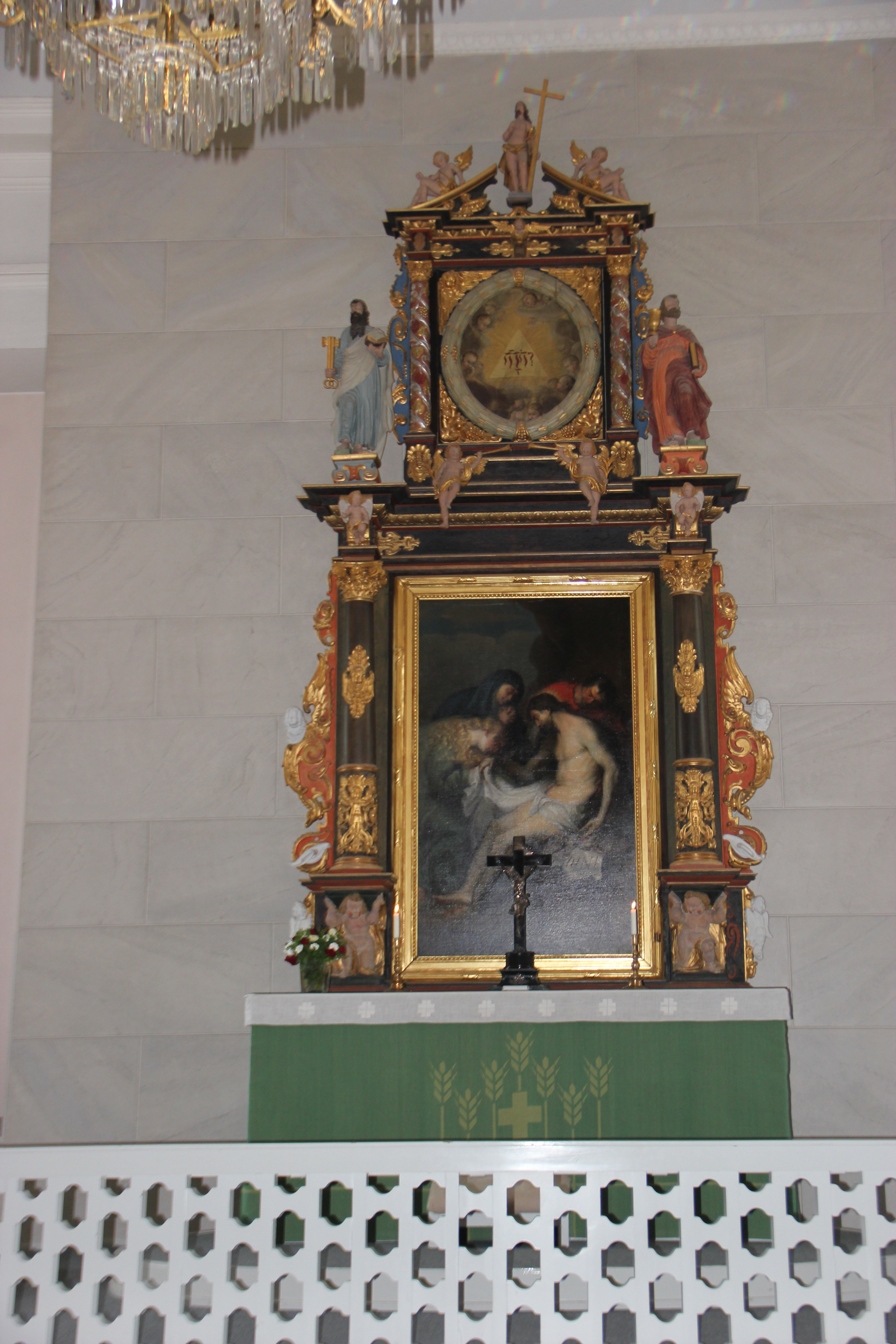
The altar piece

== Inventory ==
One of the oldest objects of the church is a Bible which belonged to vicar Sigfridus Aronus Forsius. He was the vicar of Ekenäs in 1621-1624. The Bible was rescued from fire and is now located in Ekenäs Museum.

Another pieces of 17th century inventory include vessels for the Holy Communion dating to 1613 and the altar piece which was made in Stockholm around 1660. The paintings of the altar piece are younger though. They were commissioned in Stockholm in 1797 and painted by professor Lorens Pasch the younger. The paintings represent the Holy Trinity of God and the sorrow of Christ.

The pulpit in Ekenäs Church is designed by A. F. Granstedt.

On the wall of the church is a memorial plate for the vicar Forsius.

The organ inside Ekenäs Church was built by Anders Thulé and donated to the church in 1842 by knight Berndt Erik Inberg. Since then it has been renovated a number of times. The latest restoration was completed in 1992.
