= Ingeborg Norell =

Finnish commemorative plaque subject

Ingeborg Norell (born Ingeborg Stenborg; 1727, apparently in Porvoo in present-day Finland – 1782), was the first Finnish woman to have received an official decoration and to have been the subject of a commemorative plaque. She gained recognition for saving a child's life in the village of Germund in Tenala.

In April 1780, a two-year-old girl was rescued after falling into a well, but she was in a lifeless state and presumed to have drowned. Norell, 53, was at the scene and was familiar with life-saving guidelines published by the Collegium Medicum, the forerunner of the board of medicine. Using the techniques she had studied, Norell managed to revive the child using cardiopulmonary resuscitation (CPR), which continued for more than an hour. The child made a complete recovery.

In 1782, Governor Anders de Bruce awarded her the medal of the Patriotiska Sällskapet (Prize of the Patriotic Society) and, a monetary prize followed two years later in 1783. This Prize made Ingeborg Norell the first woman to receive official recognition in Finland.

== Personal life ==
Norell was likely the daughter of the saddle maker Hans Stenborg. In 1764, she married the jeweler Carl Gustaf Norell, formerly Norelius (1738–1782) who was the apprentice to Ingeborg's brother, goldsmith Jacob Stenborg. Ingeborg's husband was eleven years younger than she was, but he died at the age of 46 in December 1782. Of the three children born into the family, the only surviving son was Jacob Johan.

Her later life remains unknown.
