= Tenala (village) =

- Village
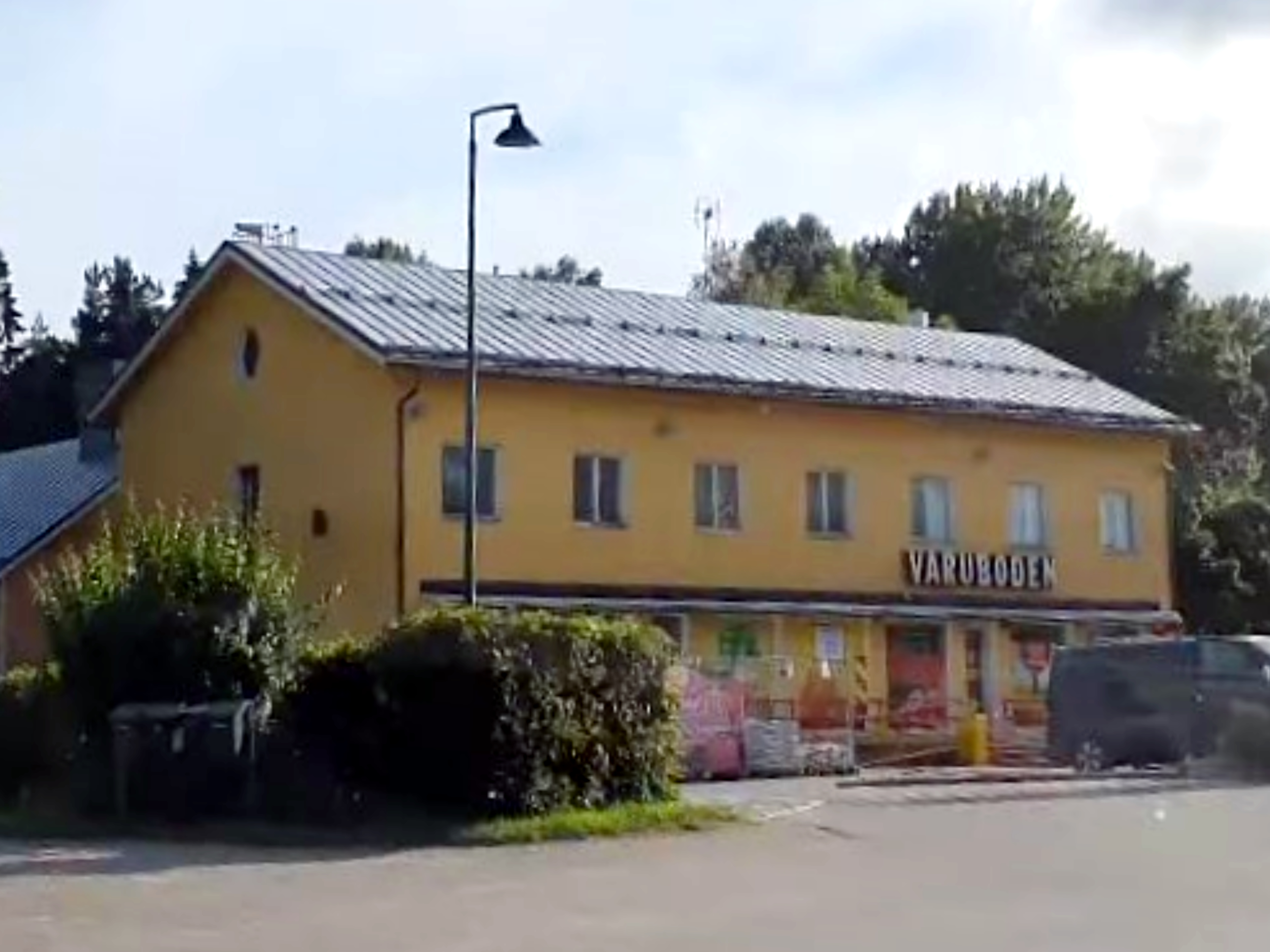
- Sale grocery store in Tenala.

- Location in Finland
- Coordinates: 60°03.29′N 23°17.53′E
- Country: Finland
- Region: Uusimaa
- Sub region: Raseborg sub-region
- Municipality: Raseborg

Area
  - Total: 2.94 km^{2} (1.14 sq mi)

Population (31 December 2022)
  - Total: 695
  - Density: 236.4/km^{2} (612/sq mi)

Tenala (Finnish: Tenhola) is a village located in the rural area of the Raseborg in Uusimaa, Finland. It was originally administrative centre of the former municipality by the same name. Almost 700 inhabitants live in the village.

The Tenala Church, the 13th-century medieval stone church is located in the village. The services of the settlement include an elementary school called Höjdens skola, a library, a pharmacy, and a Sale grocery store.

== See also ==
- Finnish national road 52
