= Raseborg Castle =

Historic site in southern Finland

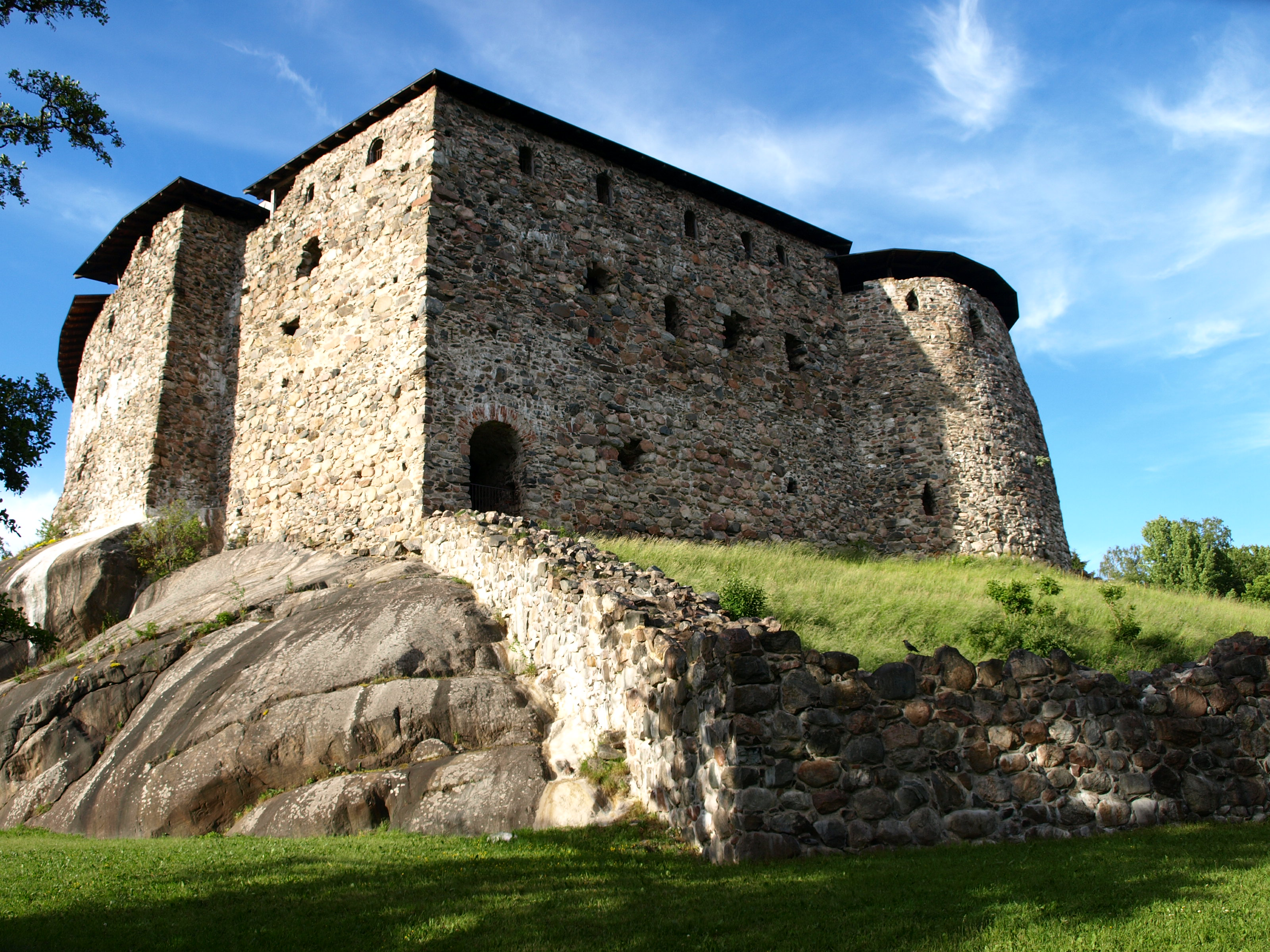
- Raseborg Castle today
- Interactive map of Raseborg Castle
- Location: Raseborg, Finland
- Coordinates: 59°59′30″N 23°39′04″E
- Built: 1370s

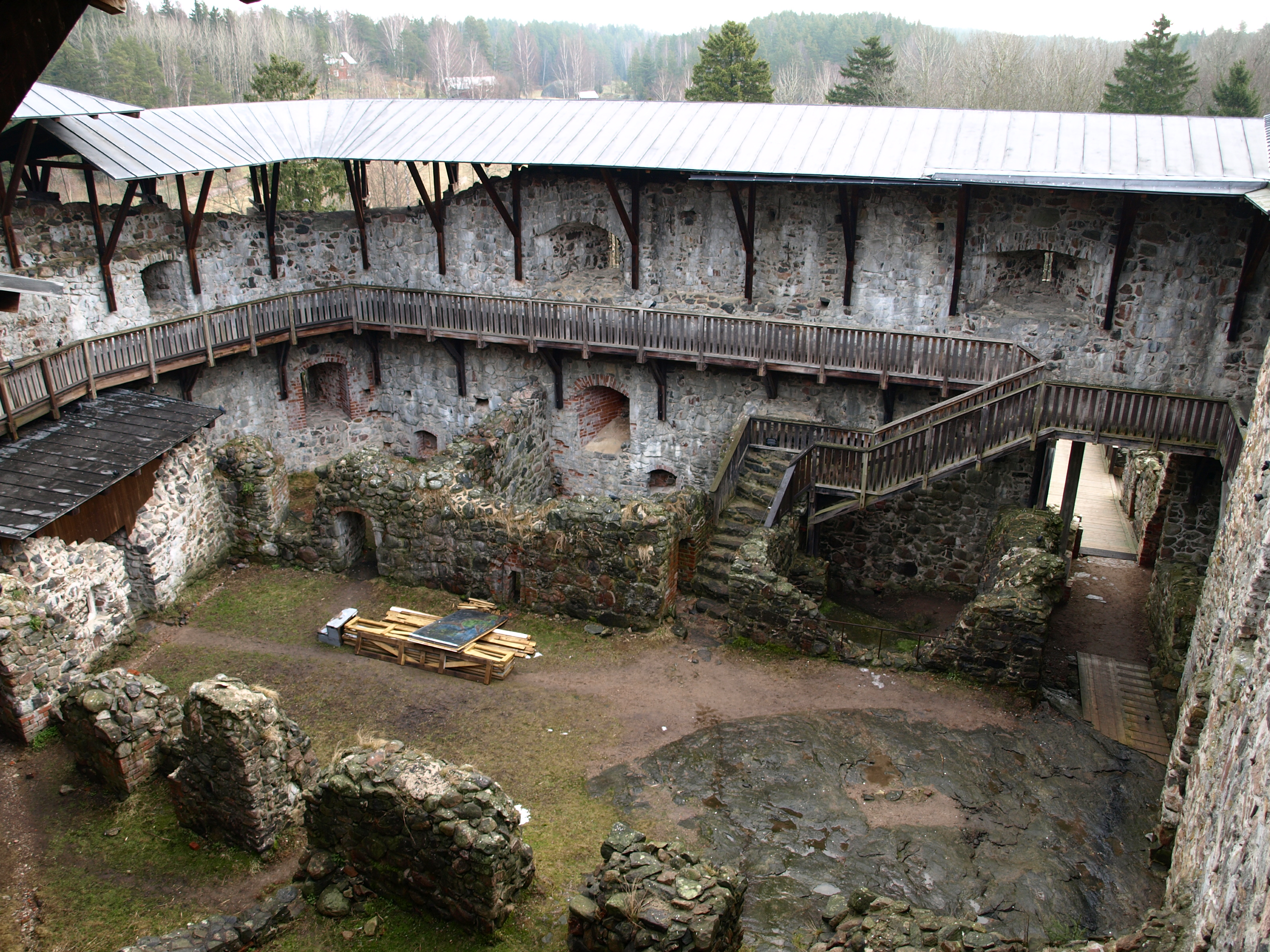
Inside view

The Raseborg Castle (Swedish: Raseborgs slott, Finnish: Raaseporin linna), is a medieval castle in Raseborg, Finland. The castle was active from 1370s to 1553. Today the ruins are open to the public in the summer and the castle is host to the yearly Raseborg Summer Theatre.

== History ==
It has been suggested that the castle was founded by Hermann of Dorpat, the successor of Albert of Riga, and Livonian Brothers of the Sword after the Livonian Crusade. They would have named the castle Ratzeburg after Bishopric of Ratzeburg. The castle is also suggested to be founded by Bo Jonsson Grip and it is thought that the castle's first phase was completed sometime between 1373 and 1378.

The first written data about the castle is from 1378. Its main purpose was to protect Sweden's interests in southern Finland against the Hanseatic city of Tallinn. The castle was originally built on a small island in the north end of a sea bay. The historians think that the castle was built in 3 different stages over time from the 14th to the 16th century.

The layout of the castle resembles a capital 'D', with a round, thick-walled donjon on one corner and the straight part of the D forming the keep, and an inner bailey in center. The castle has had outer walls forming two outer baileys. The outer wall has had one square tower and a barbican.

The ruins of the outer wall of the castle do still exist. According to the historians the outer wall was built to protect the foundations of the castle itself. When the use of the artillery became more commonplace, it was vital to protect the basic walls of the castle. There was also one more protection outside the castle. That was a wooden barrier, which surrounded the castle and it prevented any foreign ships to approach the castle harbour. There still exists some small parts of that barrier. The barriers are today on the mainland, but in the 15th century they were located on a peninsula by the sea. The sea level became lower over time due to postglacial rebound, and it became increasingly difficult to approach the castle by boat. This is one of the main reasons why the castle lost its importance.

Battles were fought between Swedish and Danish forces and even pirates over control of the castle in the Middle Ages. The castle was abandoned in 1553, three years after Helsinki was founded in 1550 and Helsinki became strategically more important.

== Present Day ==
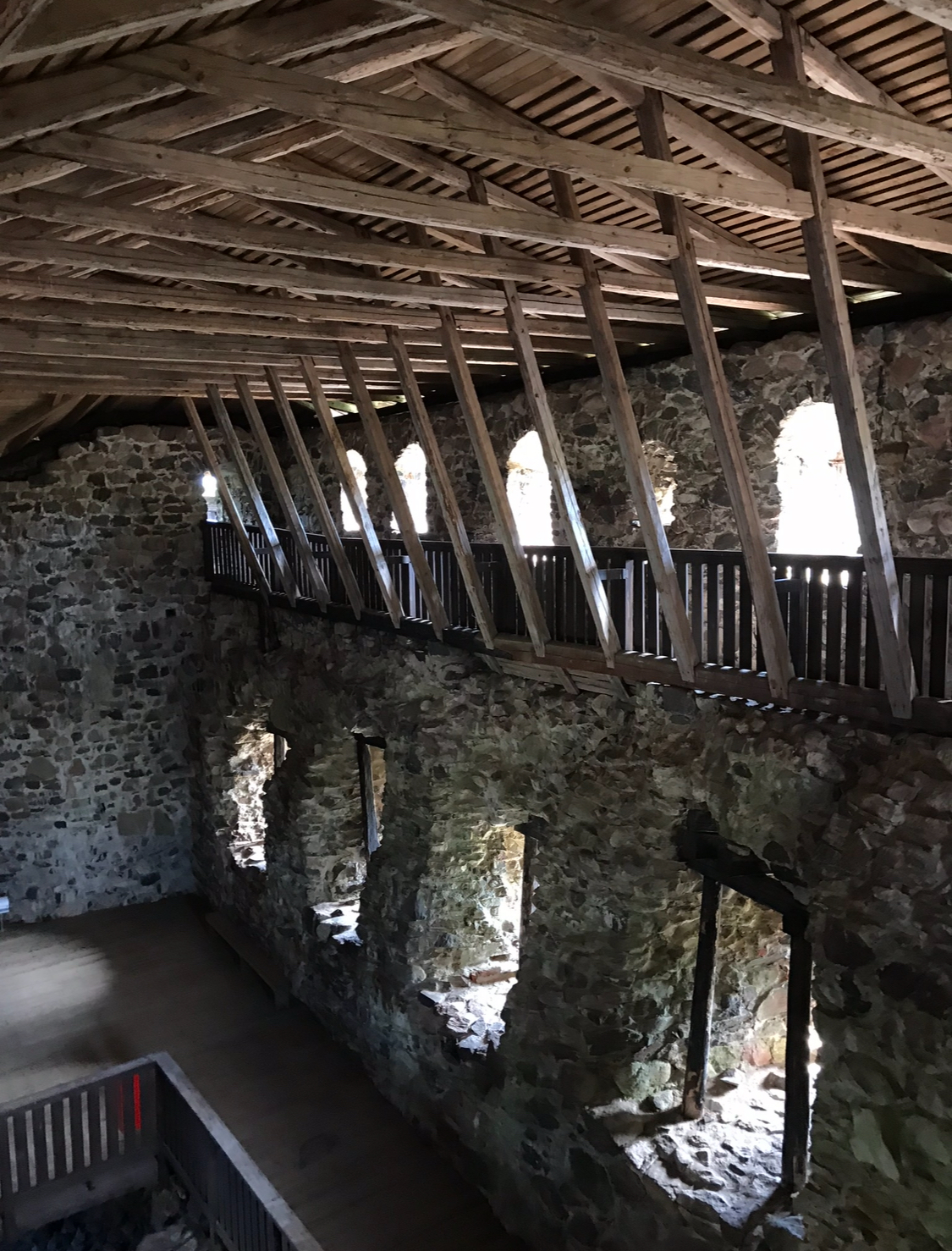
Roof on top of the ruins of the castle.

Restoration work began in the 1890s and in these days the castle ruins are open to the public.

Close to the castle ruins is one of the largest open-air theatre stages in Finland, the Raseborg Summer Theatre. The theatre was founded in 1966, and gives numerous performances in Swedish every year in July, often with a connection to the castle history.
