= Tenala =

Tenala Tenhola
- Former municipality
- Tenala kommun Tenholan kunta
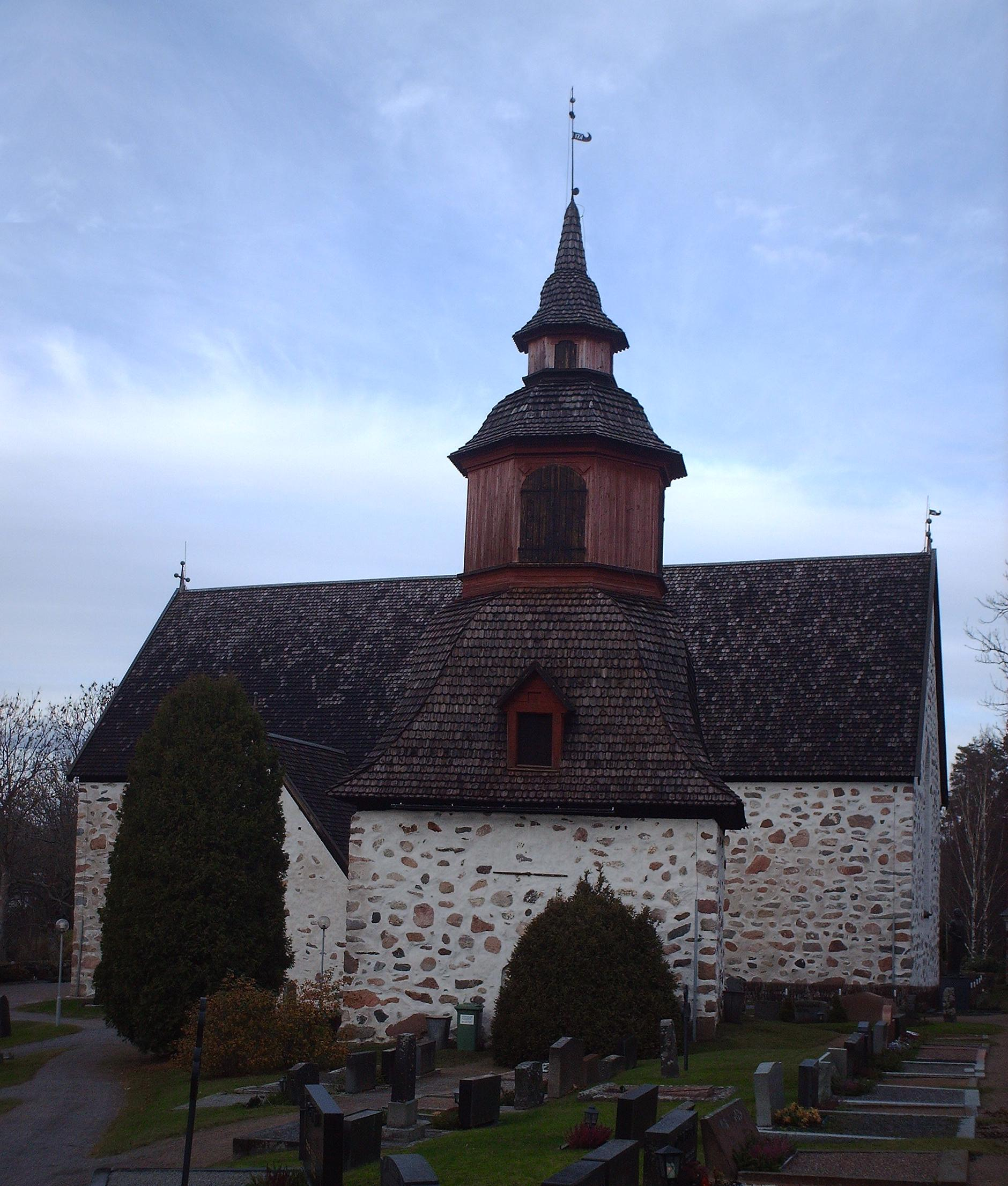
- Church in Tenala

- Coat of arms

- Interactive map of Tenala
- Location within Uusimaa Location within Finland Location within Europe
- Coordinates: 60°03′30″N 23°18′00″E
- Country: Finland
- Region: Uusimaa
- Established: 1329
- Consolidated: To Ekenäs in 1993
- Seat: Tenala

Area
  - Total: 443.6 km^{2} (171.3 sq mi)

Population (1988)
  - Total: 2,991
  - Density: 6.743/km^{2} (17.46/sq mi)

Languages
  - Swedish: 86.96%
- Climate: Dfb

Tenala (Finnish: Tenhola) is a former municipality in Uusimaa, Finland. It was neighboured by Hanko, Kisko, Perniö, Pohja, Särkisalo and Ekenäs. Most of the municipality of Bromarv was consolidated into Tenala in 1977.

The municipality was established in 1329. The stone church of Tenala was built in late 15th century and the paintings on the piers are from the 17th century. The bell tower of the church was renovated in 1762. In 1988, Tenala had 2991 inhabitants living in an area of 443.6 km^{2} and 86.96% of the inhabitants spoke Swedish as their native language. In 1993, the municipality was consolidated with Ekenäs. In 2009, Tenala became a part of the newly established city of Raseborg.

== Notable residents ==
- Ingeborg Norell, heroine of 1780
- Fredrik Stjernvall, senator
- Edvard Westermarck, sociologist and anthropologist (1862-1939)
