= Clara D. Bloomfield =

American physician and cancer researcher (1942-2020)

Clara Derber Bloomfield
- Born: May 15, 1942; Flushing, New York
- Died: March 1, 2020 (aged 77); Columbus, Ohio
- Occupations: Physician, scientist
- Spouse: Albert de la Chapelle (c. 1984–2020; her death)

Clara Derber Bloomfield (May 15, 1942 – March 1, 2020), was an American physician and cancer researcher. Her work focused on the genetic changes that are present in certain types of blood cancers, and how those can be utilized to improve treatment for the affected patients.

== Education ==
Clara D. Bloomfield graduated from University Laboratory High School in 1959, earned her B.A. from the San Diego State College (San Diego, California) in 1963, and earned her M.D. from the University of Chicago in 1968. She completed a residency in internal medicine at the University of Chicago and a fellowship in medical oncology at the University of Minnesota.

== Career ==
Bloomfield was the first woman to reach the rank of a full professor of medicine at the University of Minnesota in 1980. In 1989, she became professor of medicine and chief of the Division of Oncology at the State University of New York at Buffalo. At the same time, she was chair of the Division of Medicine at Roswell Park Comprehensive Cancer Center.

In 1997, she moved to Columbus, Ohio, where she became director of the Ohio State University Comprehensive Cancer Center - Arthur G. James Cancer Hospital and Richard J. Solove Research Institute (OSUCCC-James). She held this position until 2003.

Bloomfield was a distinguished university professor and senior adviser at the OSUCCC-James. She was also a member of the Molecular Biology and Cancer Genetics Program, a professor of internal medicine, and she held the William Greenville Pace III Endowed Chair in Cancer Research.

== Research ==
Early in her career, Bloomfield focused on the study of chromosome abnormalities in cancers of the hematopoietic system (leukemias and lymphomas). She and her co-workers identified several novel chromosome changes in leukemia and lymphoma, and discovered that these abnormalities are among the most important factors that determine a patient's prognosis. For example, Bloomfield was involved in the discovery of the Philadelphia chromosome in patients with acute lymphoblastic leukemia (ALL). She was also involved in describing the rearrangement of chromosome 16q22 in acute myeloid leukemia. In 1973, Bloomfield showed that older adults with acute myeloid leukemia (AML), a group often excluded from intensive chemotherapy, could tolerate intensive treatment, helping change assumptions about treating elderly AML patients.

Bloomfield co-authored the World Health Organization (WHO) Classification of Tumours of Haematopoietic and Lymphoid Tissues, and the European LeukemiaNet (ELN) guidelines on diagnosis and management of acute myeloid leukemia.

== Personal life ==
In 1984, Bloomfield was married to Albert de la Chapelle, a geneticist and professor in the Department of Molecular Virology, Immunology and Medical Genetics at Ohio State University and discoverer of XX male syndrome.

== Death ==
Bloomfield died on March 1, 2020, aged 77, after an accident in Columbus, Ohio.

== Honors and awards ==
Bloomfield was elected a member of the Institute of Medicine of the National Academy of Sciences in 2000. In 2011, she was elected as a fellow of the American Academy of Arts and Sciences. She also was an elected member of the Association of American Physicians and an elected fellow of the American Association for the Advancement of Science.

Among the awards Bloomfield received during her career are:

- The Joseph H. Burchenal Clinical Research Award from the American Association for Cancer Research (2004)
- The Distinguished Service Award for Scientific Achievement from the American Society of Clinical Oncology (ASCO) (2006)
- The Henry M. Stratton Medal from the American Society of Hematology (ASH) (2008)
- The David A. Karnofsky Memorial Award from ASCO (2009).
- The Giants of Cancer Care(R) Award in Myeloid Neoplasms (2015)
- Margaret Kripke Legend Award (2016)

== Sources ==
- National Library of Medicine. Biography: Dr. Clara D. Bloomfield
- Search Results for author Bloomfield CD on PubMed.
