= Raseborg =

Raseborg Raseborg – Raasepori
- Town
- Raseborgs stad Raaseporin kaupunki
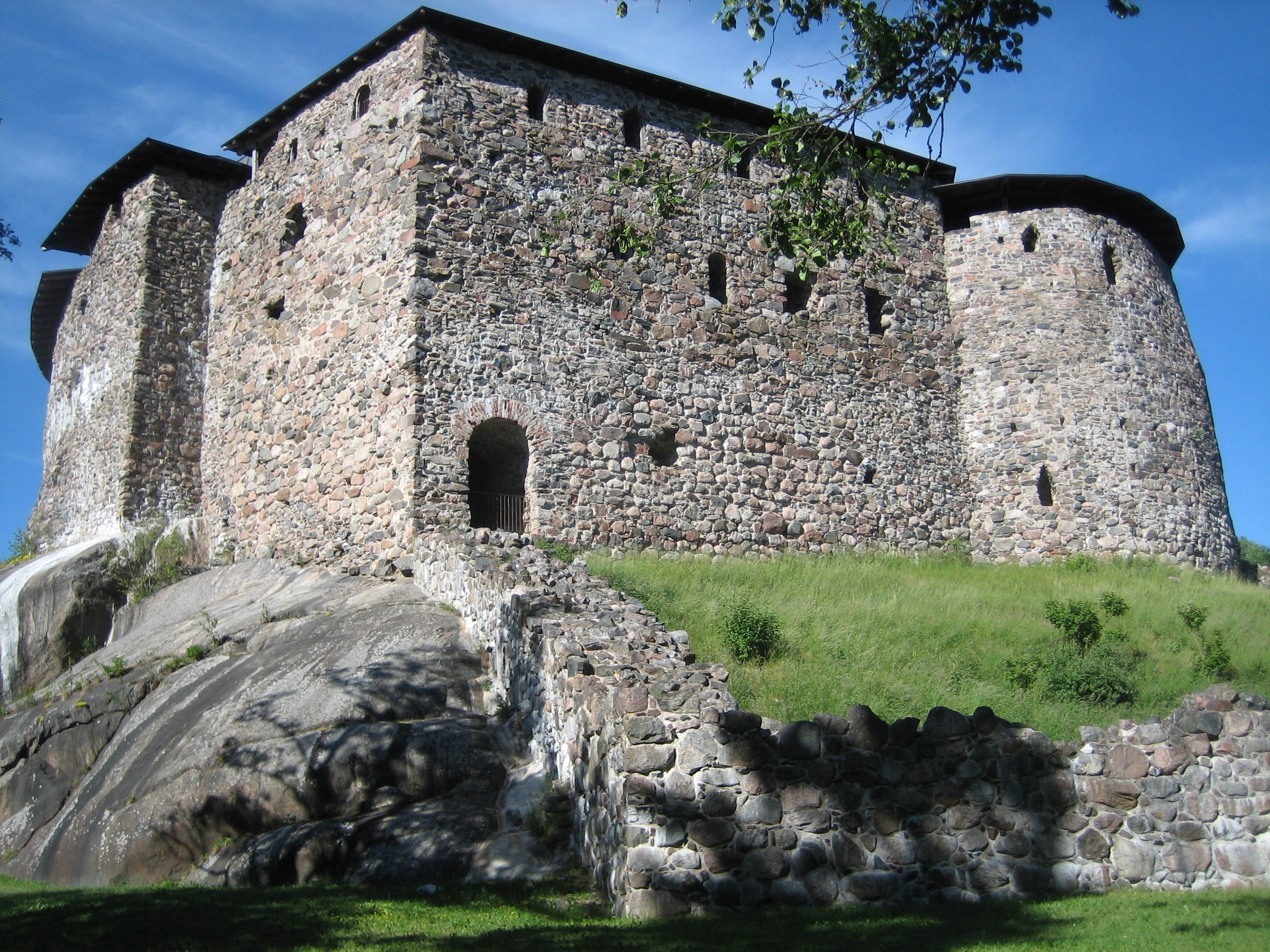
- Castle of Raseborg

- Flag Coat of arms

- Location of Raseborg in Finland
- Interactive map of Raseborg
- Coordinates: 59°58.5′N 023°26′E
- Country: Finland
- Region: Uusimaa
- Sub-region: Raseborg
- Charter: 2009
- Administrative centre: Ekenäs
- Other settlements: Fiskars, Karis, Tenala

Government
  - Town manager: Petra Theman

Area (2018-01-01)
  - Total: 2,354.24 km^{2} (908.98 sq mi)
  - Land: 1,149.36 km^{2} (443.77 sq mi)
  - Water: 1,206.47 km^{2} (465.82 sq mi)
  - Rank: 67th largest in Finland

Population (2025-12-31)
  - Total: 26,856
  - Rank: 39th largest in Finland
  - Density: 23.37/km^{2} (60.5/sq mi)

Population by native language
  - Swedish: 63.3% (official)
  - Finnish: 30.3% (official)
  - Others: 6.4%

Population by age
  - 0 to 14: 14.5%
  - 15 to 64: 58%
  - 65 or older: 27.6%
- Time zone: UTC+02:00 (EET)
  - Summer (DST): UTC+03:00 (EEST)
- Climate: Dfb
- Website: www.raseborg.fi

Raseborg (Finland Swedish: [ˈrɑːseˌborj]; Finnish: Raasepori, Finnish: [ˈrɑːseˌpori]) is a town in Finland, located in the southern coast of the country. Raseborg is situated in the western part of the Uusimaa region. The population of Raseborg is approximately 27,000, while the sub-region has a population of approximately 40,000. It is the 39th most populous municipality in Finland.

Raseborg was created on January 1, 2009, when the municipalities of Ekenäs, Karis and Pojo were consolidated into a single town, creating the largest Swedish-speaking-majority city of Finland in terms of population. Of these, Ekenäs now serves as the administrative center of Raseborg. The name of the new town is based on the Raseborg Castle located in Ekenäs, or formerly in the municipality of Snappertuna. Historically the name of the county was also Raseborg in the 14th century.

Raseborg covers an area of 2,354.24 square kilometres (908.98 sq mi) of which 1,206.47 km^{2} (465.82 sq mi) is water. The population density is 23.37 inhabitants per square kilometre (60.5/sq mi).

Raseborg is a bilingual municipality with Finnish and Swedish as its official languages. The population consists of 30% Finnish speakers, 63% Swedish speakers, and 6% speakers of other languages.

The coat of arms of Raseborg, introduced in 2009, is inspired by the area's grove biotope and the eight former municipalities that originally belonged to the united municipality, which are symbolized by white windflowers arranged in a circle. The yellow wall crown on top of the green shield in the area therefore belongs to the history of the region and its three fortresses (including the Raseborg Castle). In addition to the coat of arms, the town of Raseborg uses a flag and pennon based on the coat of arms. The coat of arms has attracted criticism for its "non-heraldic structure".

In February 2011, Raseborg Municipality entered into a "Friendship Co-operation Agreement" with Makana Municipality in South Africa. The project, which is to last three years, seeks to facilitate information sharing in the fields of economic development, arts and culture, women's development, youth development, and education.

== History ==
Municipalities of the area, all of them except Hanko are now parts of Raseborg.

Raseborg as a municipal name is a new coinage, but the castle of Raseborg was first mentioned in 1378 as Rasaborge. It acted as the center of the Raseborg slottslän (Finnish: linnalääni) covering western Uusimaa and some parts of Finland Proper such as Kisko.

The area of the modern municipality had eight municipalities at its peak: Ekenäs, Ekenäs landskommun, Snappertuna, Karis, Karis landskommun, Pohja, Tenala and Bromarv. The first merger in the area happened in 1969, when Karis landskommun was merged into Karis. By 2008, only Ekenäs, Pohja and Karis were independent municipalities, forming the modern Raseborg municipality in 2009.

== Demographics ==
Population size 1990–2025
Year	Population
1990	28,565
1995	28,567
2000	28,436
2005	28,396
2010	29,065
2015	28,405
2020	27,528
2025	26,856

== Politics ==
After the 2021 municipal election the municipal council of Raseborg became the following:

Party	Share of vote (%)	Seats
Swedish People's Party	49.2	23
Social Democrats	27.6	12
Greens	7.5	3
National Coalition Party	5.9	2
Left	4.6	2
Finns Party	4	1

== Culture ==
=== Sights ===
- Ekenäs Church
- Riilahti Manor
- Raseborg Castle
- Raseborg Museum
- Fiskars Village

== See also ==
- Fiskars, Finland
- Ingå
- Tenala (village)
