= Ekenäs, Finland =

Ekenäs Ekenäs (Swedish) Tammisaari (Finnish)
- Former municipality
- Ekenäs stad Tammisaaren kaupunki Ekenäs Town
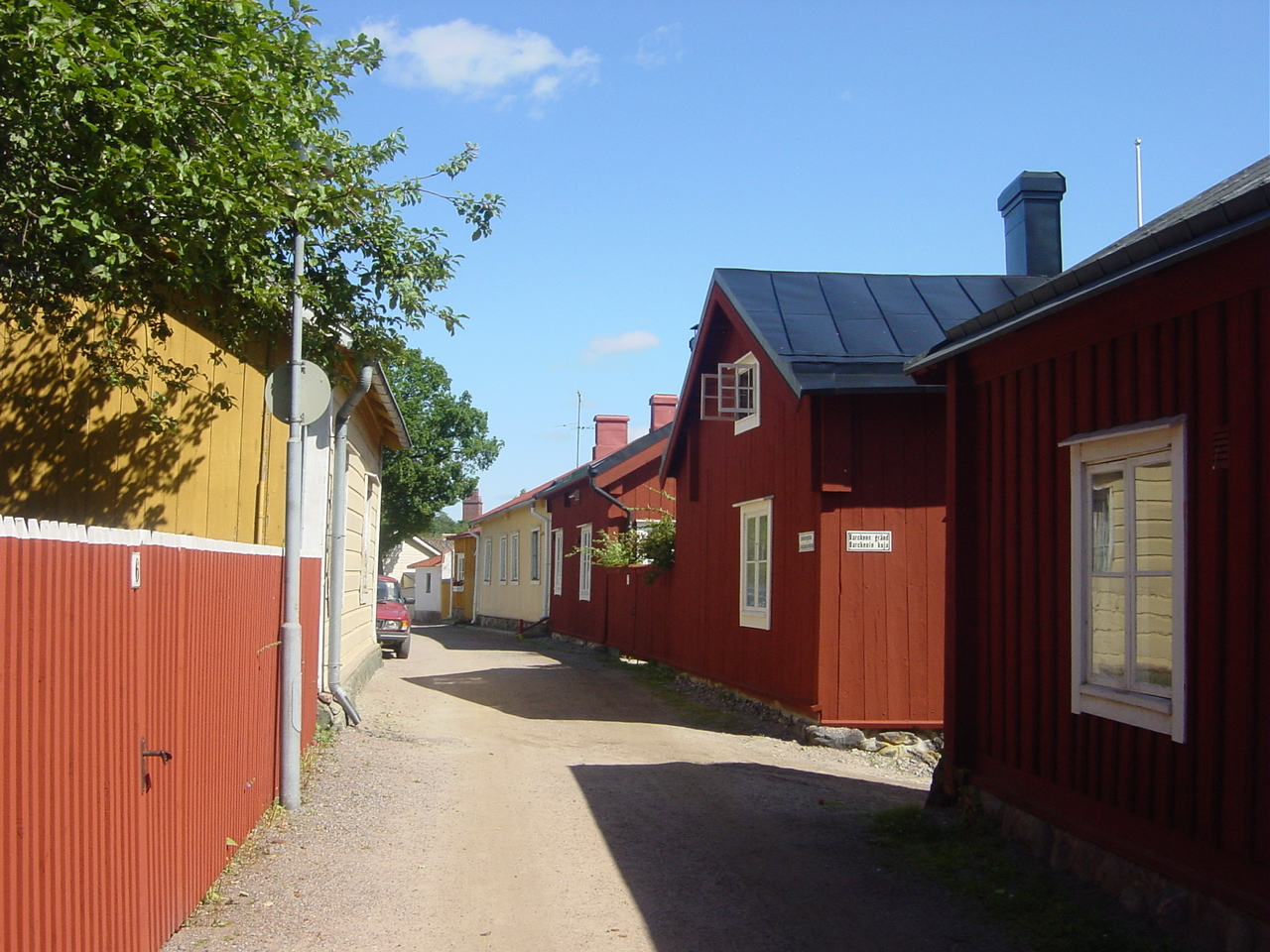
- An alley in Ekenäs

- Coat of arms

- Location of Ekenäs in Finland
- Interactive map of Ekenäs
- Location within Uusimaa Location within Finland Location within Europe
- Coordinates: 59°58′28″N 23°26′8″E
- Country: Finland
- Region: Uusimaa
- Sub-region: Ekenäs sub-region
- Founded: 1546
- Consolidated: 2009

Area
  - Total: 1,873.38 km^{2} (723.32 sq mi)
  - Land: 726.73 km^{2} (280.59 sq mi)
  - Water: 1,146.65 km^{2} (442.72 sq mi)

Population (2008-12-31)
  - Total: 14,754

Population by native language
  - Finnish: 17% (official)
  - Swedish: 81% (official)
- Time zone: UTC+2 (EET)
  - Summer (DST): UTC+3 (EEST)
- Climate: Dfb

Aerial views of Ekenäs

Ekenäs (Finland Swedish: [ˈeːkeneːs]; Finnish: Tammisaari [ˈtɑmːisɑːri]) is a town and former municipality in Finland that was formed by the merger of the former municipalities of Snappertuna and Tenala with the town of Ekenäs. It was then merged with Pohja and Karis to form the new municipality of Raseborg on 1 January 2009. Ekenäs is in the province of Southern Finland, and is part of the Uusimaa (Swedish: Nyland) region. The town had a population of 14,754 (as of 31 December 2008) and covered a land area of 726.73 square kilometres (280.59 sq mi). The population density was 20.30 inhabitants per square kilometre (52.6/sq mi). The town is bilingual, with the majority being Swedish speakers (81%), and the minority Finnish speakers (17%).

== History ==
Ekenäs is Finland's seventh oldest town and the first of the non-medieval towns. King Gustav Wasa granted town rights to Ekenäs on 15 December 1546, but even before that Ekenäs played a significant role in maritime transport. Today it is mostly noted for its archipelago, part of which is the Ekenäs Archipelago National Park. The old, mainly wooden town center is protected due to its cultural historical value, and renovation of even residential buildings is strictly controlled. The history of the old town dates back to 16th century, but most of the current buildings have been built between 18th and 19th century.

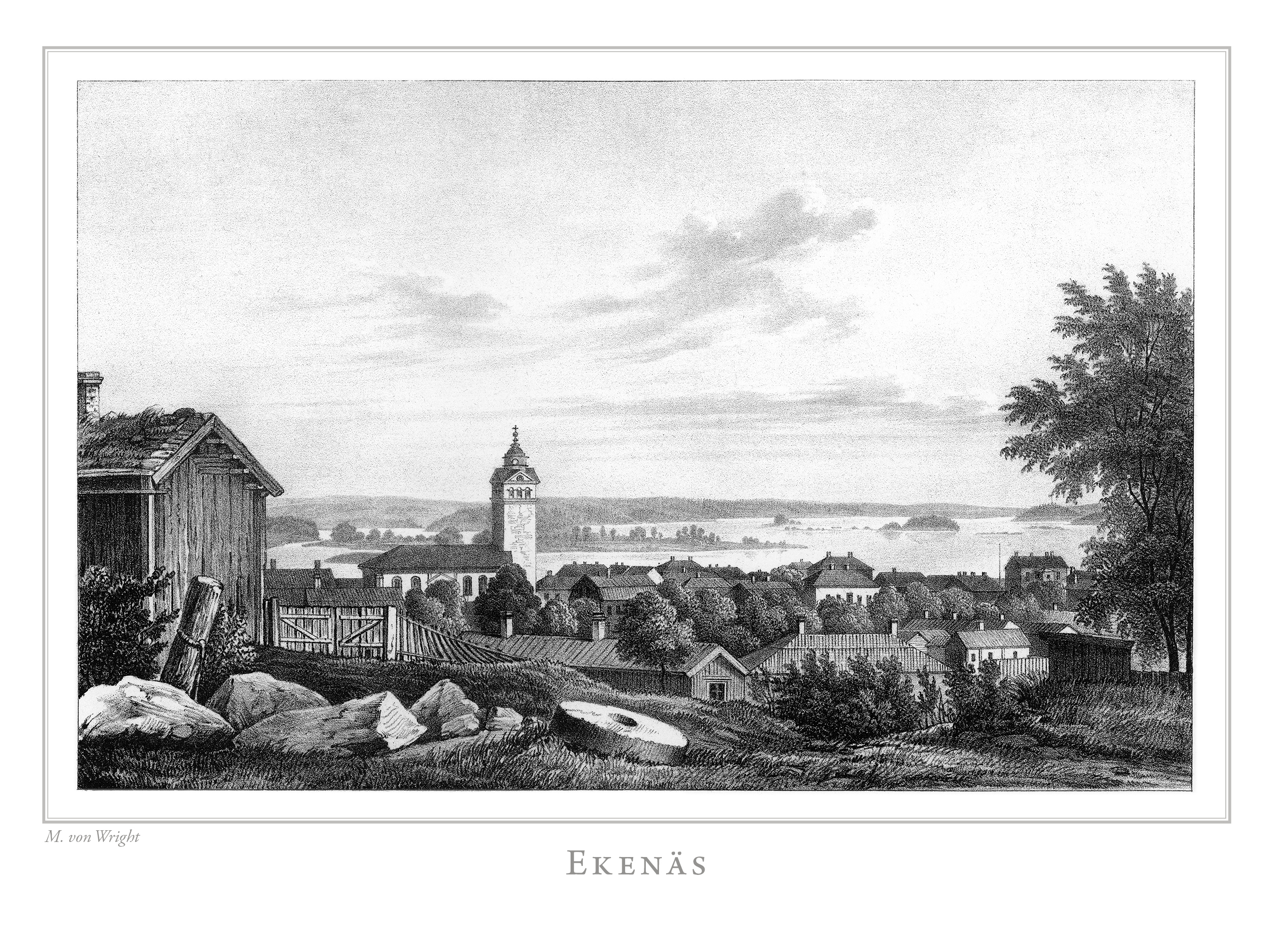
Ekenäs illustrated in the book series Finland framställdt i teckningar published 1845–1852

The present Neoclassical form of the Ekenäs church was designed by Italian-born architect Charles Bassi in 1839–1842 following a fire in 1821. There are two buildings in Ekenäs designed by world famous Finnish architect Alvar Aalto; the Ekenäs Savings Bank (1964) and Villa Skeppet (1969), the home of Aalto's biographer, Göran Schildt.

Ekenäs is home of the oldest still functional movie theatre in Finland called Bio Forum. The theatre is located in the old town centre in a small Art Nouveau (Jugend) building and it was founded in 1912. At the time it was called Ekenäs Nya Biograf Teater.

== Notable people ==
Among notable residents are author Marianne Alopaeus, who wrote in Swedish. She was born in Ekenäs in 1918. One of the most renowned finnish modernist painters Helene Schjerfbeck spend her summers 1918-1920 in Ekenäs and lived in the town permanently 1925-1941. Ekenäs museum center Ekta has a permanent exhibition of her work called Helene Schjerfbeck's Life and Art.

Emma Engdahl-Jägerskiöld, one of Finland's first internationally-recognised opera singers grew up in, and always retained a close connection with, Ekenäs.

Kaija Saarikettu, violinist and Professor at Sibelius Academy, was born in Ekenäs.

== Attractions ==
Every year Christmas Markets and Christmas opening are organized on the wooden house idyll, pedestrian street Kungsgatan and the market square.

Ekenäs has an award winning art museum Chappe, an art house by the Sea.

== Sub-region of Uusimaa ==
Ekenäs was also the name of a sub-region of Uusimaa, containing the following municipalities before 2009:

- Ekenäs
- Hanko
- Ingå
- Karis
- Pohja

== See also ==
- Bromarv
- Fiskars, Finland

== Gallery ==
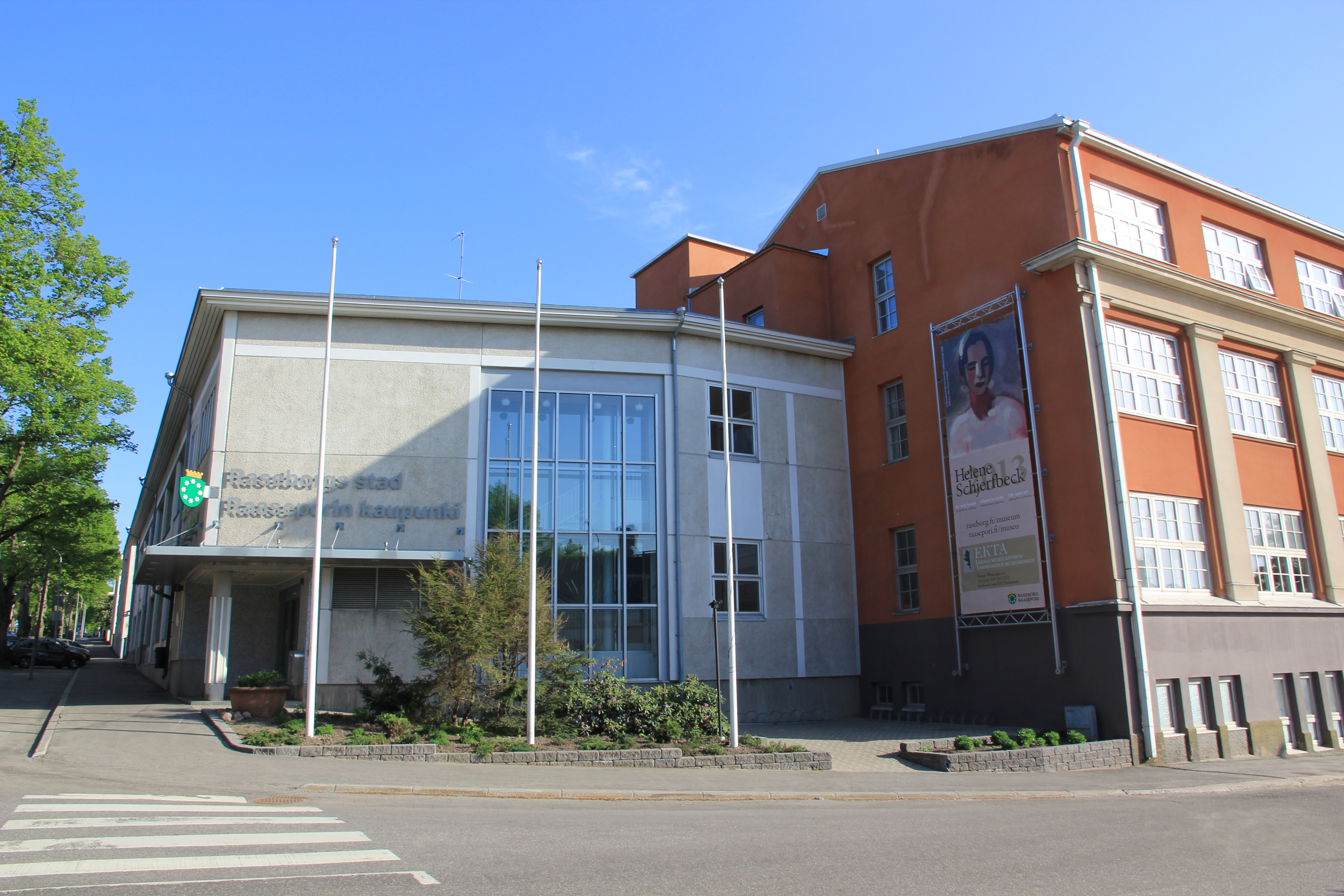
Raseborg City Hall in Ekenäs

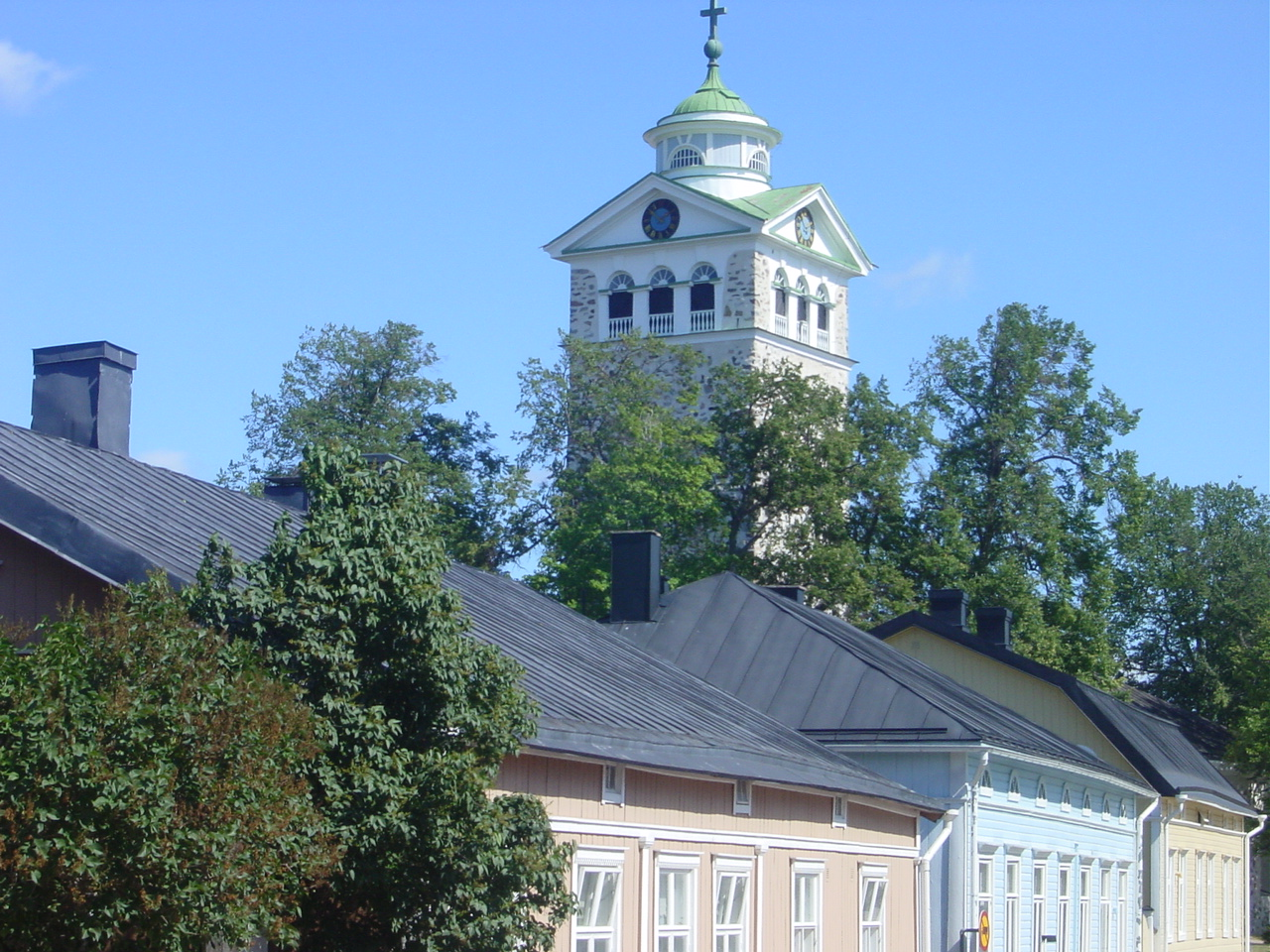
Charles Bassi, Ekenäs church

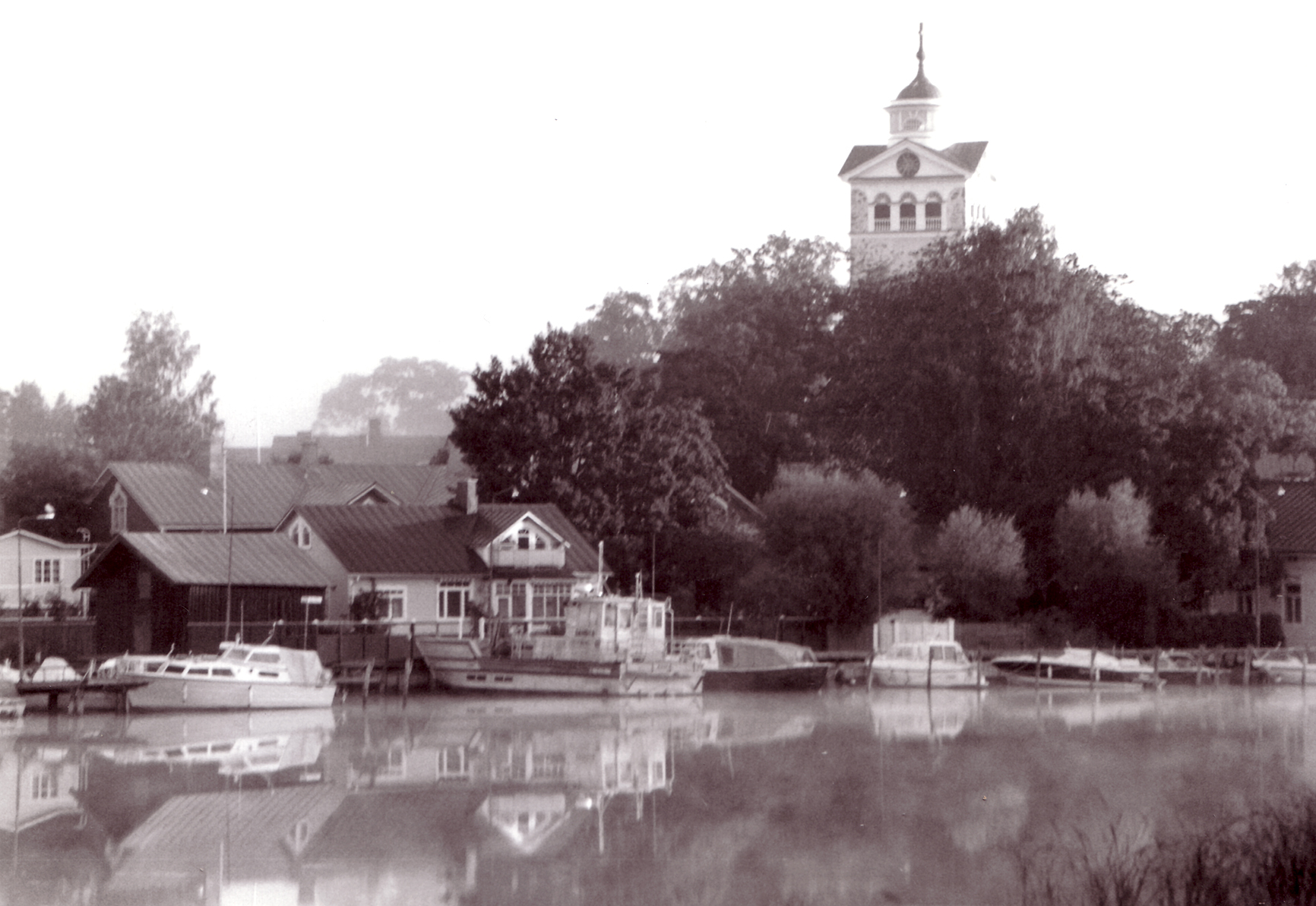
Ekenäs seen from south

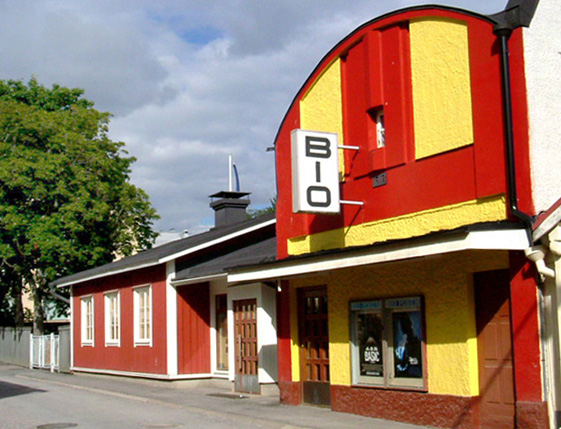
Movie theatre in Ekenäs

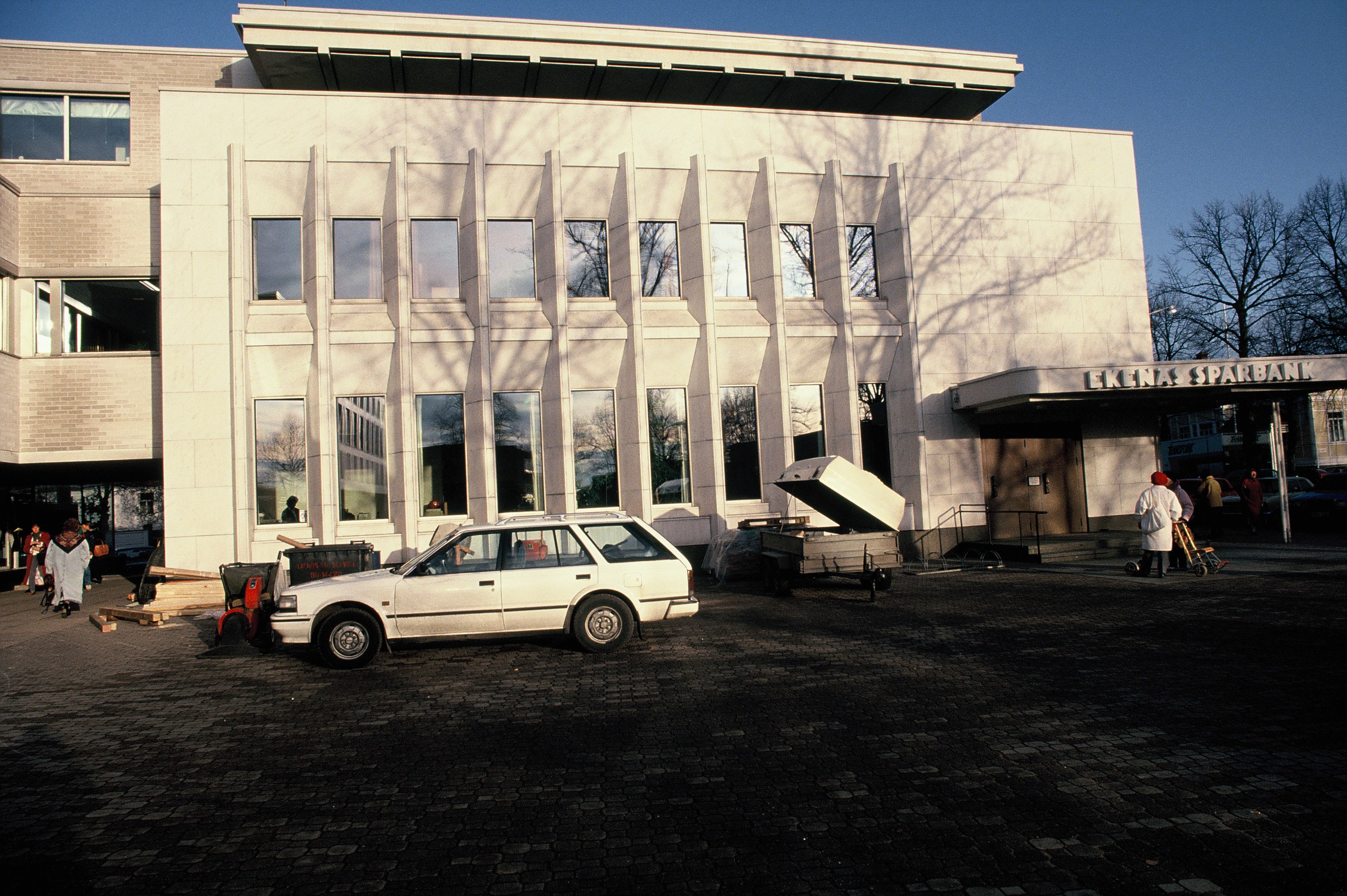
Alvar Aalto, Ekenäs Savings Bank
