= Aira Samulin =

Finnish dance teacher and businesswoman (1927–2023)

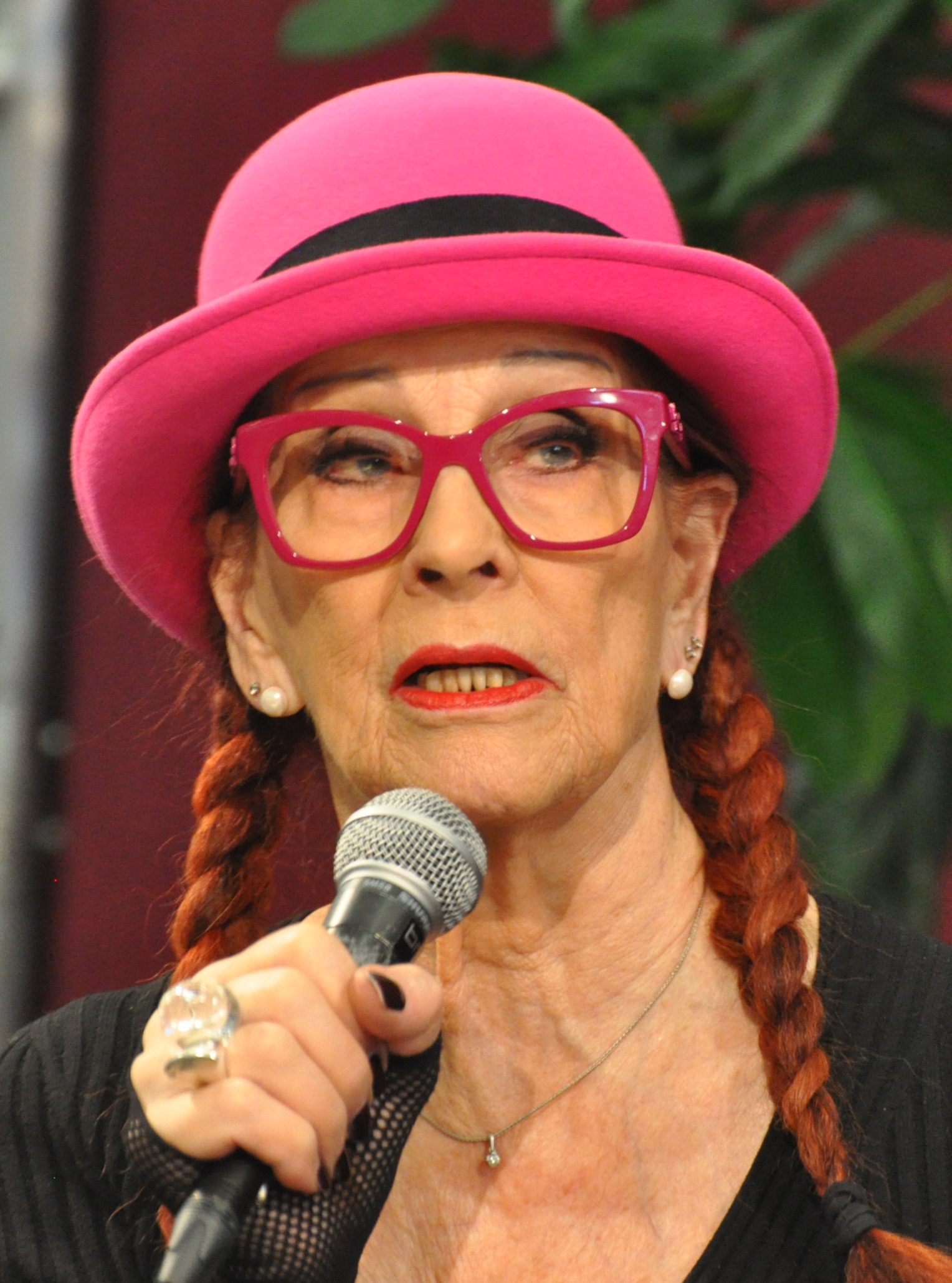
- Samulin at the Turku book fair in 2016
- Born: Aira Laila Suvio; 27 February 1927; Ignoila, Salmi, Finland (present-day Russia)
- Died: 23 October 2023 (aged 96); Helsinki, Finland
- Other names: Aira Laila Suvio-Samulin
- Occupations: Dance teacher, businesswoman
- Spouse: Helge Samulin (sep. 1963)
- Children: 1 daughter, 1 son
- Awards: Order of the Lion of Finland

Aira Laila Suvio-Samulin (née Suvio; 27 February 1927 – 23 October 2023) was a Finnish dance teacher and businesswoman.

== Life and career ==
Samulin was born on 27 February 1927 in Ignoila, Salmi, Finland (present-day Russia). The village was part of the municipality of Salmi, until it was annexed to Suojärvi in 1931. Ignoila was the easternmost of the villages in the so-called "Hyrsylä curve".

Samulin's father was killed in action as a troop leader in the Continuation War on 27 July 1941. Samulin's uncle, Sten Suvio, was an Olympic boxer.

In 1954, Samulin was chosen as a mannequin queen.

Samulin was the director of her own dance school and worked as a filming secretary at Suomen Filmiteollisuus. In the 1960s Samulin founded a fashion dance school called Rytmikkäät mannekiinit, (rhythmical mannequins).

From 1989 to 1996, Samulin was a member of the city council of Espoo, representing the Centre Party. From 1997, she was a member of the City Council of Helsinki, representing the National Coalition Party. Since 2001, she was a deputy member of the city council of Helsinki. She was a member of the Helsinki Week Foundation and of its environmental board, as well as a deputy member of the Helsinki Theatre Foundation.

In 2001, a film of Samulin's life called Tango Kabaree was made, with Samulin playing herself. She also played herself in the film Uuno Turhapuro – This Is My Life and on one episode of the TV sitcom Fakta homma.

Samulin had a Karelian-style house called "Hyrsylän mutka" in the village of Hyrsylä, Nummi, Lohja, which is a local sight. The house was named after the village of Hyrsylä in the Republic of Karelia, which was ceded to Russia after the Continuation War.

== Personal life and death ==
Samulin had a daughter, Pirjo (1947–2018) and a son, Jari Samulin (born 1955) from her marriage to Helge Samulin, which ended in a separation in 1963. Aira Samulin had a short relationship with designer Timo Sarpaneva and also a relationship with sports commentator Paavo Noponen from 1965 to 1972. Samulin was married to Ekku Peltomäki from 1973 to 2004.

Aira Samulin died from a brain haemorrhage in Helsinki, on 23 October 2023, at the age of 96.

== Awards and recognition ==
Samulin was awarded the Order of the Lion of Finland knight award, the Mental Health Award of Mieli ry for her artwork Auringonpimennys ("solar eclipse") about family violence and mental health disturbances and an Entertainment work award. She was especially active in youth activities.

In 2011 the Regional Organisation of Enterprises in Helsinki awarded its first life's work award to Samulin.

In 2017 the Finnish central chamber of commerce awarded Samulin for her life's work in the fashion industry.

In 2019 Reserviratsastajat ry awarded Samulin a golden rider's medal for her work for the riding tradition and defense of the country.

== Bibliography ==
- Soturi ja sunnuntailapsi. Edited by Sirkka-Liisa Lähteenoja. Helsinki: WSOY, 1987. ISBN 951-0-14684-6.
- Auringonpimennys. Edited by Sirkka-Liisa Lähteenoja. Helsinki: WSOY, 1989. ISBN 951-0-16070-9. 2nd edition 1999, common book Soturi ja sunnuntailapsi; Auringonpimennys. Helsinki: WSOY, 2007. ISBN 978-951-0-33045-6.
- Uskomaton Aira Samulin. Edited by Sauli Miettinen. Helsinki: WSOY, 2016. ISBN 978-951-041-565-8.
