= Leppäkorpi =

Leppäkorpi may refer to:

- Leppäkorpi (Pori), a district in Pori, Finland
- Leppäkorpi (Vantaa), a district in Vantaa, Finland
- Leppäkorpi (Nummi), a village in Lohja, Finland
