= Lohja =

Town in Uusimaa, Finland

Lohja Lohja – Lojo
- City
- Lohjan kaupunki Lojo stad
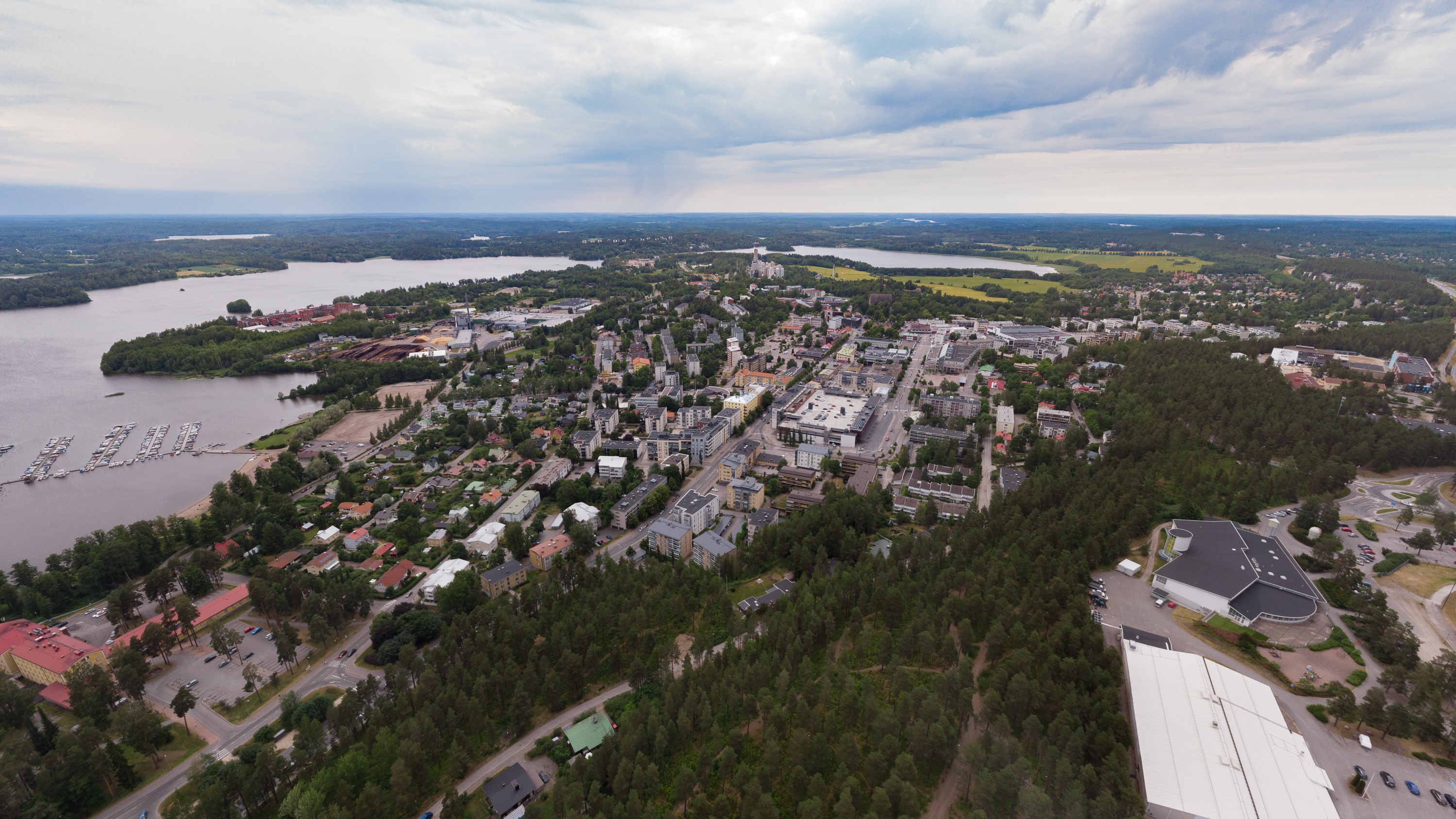

- Coat of arms
- Motto: Järvikaupunki – Insjöstaden
- Location of Lohja in Finland
- Interactive map of Lohja
- Coordinates: 60°15′N 024°04′E
- Country: Finland
- Region: Uusimaa
- Sub-region: Helsinki sub-region (formerly Lohja sub-region)
- Charter: 1926
- City rights: 1969

Government
  - City manager: Pasi Perämäki

Area (2018-01-01)
  - Total: 1,109.73 km^{2} (428.47 sq mi)
  - Land: 940.16 km^{2} (363.00 sq mi)
  - Water: 91.78 km^{2} (35.44 sq mi)
  - Rank: 82nd largest in Finland

Population (2025-12-31)
  - Total: 45,435
  - Rank: 25th largest in Finland
  - Density: 48.33/km^{2} (125.2/sq mi)

Population by native language
  - Finnish: 89.4% (official)
  - Swedish: 3.4% (official)
  - Others: 7.2%

Population by age
  - 0 to 14: 15.8%
  - 15 to 64: 59.5%
  - 65 or older: 24.7%
- Time zone: UTC+02:00 (EET)
  - Summer (DST): UTC+03:00 (EEST)
- Climate: Dfb
- Website: www.lohja.fi

Lohja (Finnish pronunciation: [ˈlohjɑ]; Swedish: Lojo) is a town in Finland, located in the southern interior of the country. Lohja is situated in the western part of the Uusimaa region. The population of Lohja is approximately 45,000. It is the 25th most populous municipality in Finland. Lohja is part of the Helsinki sub-region, but not directly part of the Helsinki metropolitan area.

Lohja covers an area of 1,109.73 square kilometres (428.47 sq mi) of which 91.78 km^{2} (35.44 sq mi), or 8.3 percent, is water. The population density of Lohja is 48.33 inhabitants per square kilometre (125.2/sq mi).

Lohja has the fourth most summer cottages of any municipality in Finland, with 8,468 in the city as of June 2018. Lohja is close to the Helsinki metropolitan area and benefits from a good road network. It takes less than an hour to drive from Helsinki to Lohja on the E18 motorway, which, along with Hangonväylä, is one of Lohja's main road connections.

Lohja is a bilingual municipality with Finnish and Swedish as its official languages. The population consists of 89% Finnish speakers, 3% Swedish speakers, and 7% speakers of other languages. City's bilingual slogan is: Järvikaupunki – Insjöstaden which translates to "Lake city".

The landscape of Lohja is characterized by manors and gardens. Its area is divided by the Lohja ridge, which forms a watershed for the largest lake system in Uusimaa, Lake Lohja (Lohjanjärvi); mostly that's why Lohja is also referred to as "Lake City" (järvikaupunki). The medieval Church of St. Lawrence is the architectural highlight of downtown Lohja, which also includes a heterogeneous mix of buildings mostly dating from the 1960s onwards. The Lohja library, which was opened in 2005, is a distinctly modern building placed in the very centre of the city.

Lohja has been a focal point for the population and economy of western Uusimaa since the early 14th century. It was renowned as a trading centre in the Middle Ages. The local inhabitants were among the pioneers of the Finnish mining and construction material industries. Lohja has long-established traditions in horticulture and especially in market gardening. These traditions are represented by the symbols of present-day Lohja: limestone and an apple.

== Politics ==
=== Local ===
Pasi Perämäki is the city manager of Lohja. The city manager oversees the city committee. In addition to the city committee, Lohja has a 51-seat municipal council. The parties represented in the council as well as their seat counts are listed below.

City Council of Lohja
Party	Seats
Social Democratic Party	11
National Coalition Party	10
Green League	7
Left Alliance	6
Finns Party	6
Centre Party	5
Meidän Lohja	3
Swedish People's Party	1
Christian Democrats	1
Haloo Lohja	1

=== National ===
==== 2015 parliamentary election ====
Results of the 2015 parliamentary election in Lohja
Party	Vote share
Social Democratic Party	25,5%
Finns Party	22,9%
National Coalition Party	16,5%
Centre Party	12,9%
Green League	7,2%
Left Alliance	5,9%
Swedish People's Party	3,1%
Christian Democrats	3,1%
Change 2011	1,1%

== Climate ==
Lohja has a humid continental climate (Köppen: Dfb)

Climate data for Lohja Porla (1991-2020 normals, extremes 1959-present)
Month	Jan	Feb	Mar	Apr	May	Jun	Jul	Aug	Sep	Oct	Nov	Dec	Year
Record high °C (°F)	8.5 (47.3)	9.4 (48.9)	14.4 (57.9)	23.4 (74.1)	29.0 (84.2)	31.0 (87.8)	31.7 (89.1)	30.8 (87.4)	25.7 (78.3)	16.7 (62.1)	13.3 (55.9)	10.5 (50.9)	31.7 (89.1)
Mean daily maximum °C (°F)	−1.3 (29.7)	−1.7 (28.9)	2.3 (36.1)	8.8 (47.8)	15.6 (60.1)	19.4 (66.9)	22.1 (71.8)	20.3 (68.5)	15.0 (59.0)	8.5 (47.3)	3.6 (38.5)	0.7 (33.3)	9.4 (48.9)
Daily mean °C (°F)	−3.8 (25.2)	−4.6 (23.7)	−1.4 (29.5)	4.1 (39.4)	10.5 (50.9)	14.9 (58.8)	17.7 (63.9)	16.2 (61.2)	11.5 (52.7)	6.0 (42.8)	1.8 (35.2)	−1.4 (29.5)	6.0 (42.8)
Mean daily minimum °C (°F)	−6.5 (20.3)	−7.6 (18.3)	−4.8 (23.4)	0.4 (32.7)	6.1 (43.0)	11.0 (51.8)	14.1 (57.4)	13.1 (55.6)	8.9 (48.0)	3.8 (38.8)	−0.1 (31.8)	−3.6 (25.5)	2.9 (37.2)
Record low °C (°F)	−35.6 (−32.1)	−35.1 (−31.2)	−29.3 (−20.7)	−19.2 (−2.6)	−3.6 (25.5)	1.8 (35.2)	6.1 (43.0)	2.6 (36.7)	−3.2 (26.2)	−11.3 (11.7)	−20.1 (−4.2)	−32 (−26)	−35.6 (−32.1)
Average precipitation mm (inches)	58 (2.3)	45 (1.8)	38 (1.5)	35 (1.4)	38 (1.5)	62 (2.4)	68 (2.7)	83 (3.3)	59 (2.3)	76 (3.0)	75 (3.0)	66 (2.6)	701 (27.6)
Average precipitation days (≥ 1.0 mm)	11	9	8	7	7	9	9	10	9	11	12	12	114
Source 1: FMI normals 1991-2020
Source 2: Record highs and lows

== Culture ==
Lohja is famed for its cultural events. More than a hundred different events are arranged in the city each year by its residents and organizations. The most notable are the Lohja Summer Cultural Festival, the Apple Carnival organized by representatives of business and commerce, the retailers' Hurlumhei Carnival and the Old Time Christmas market continue the tradition of fairs dating back to the Middle Ages.

The Doom Metal band Reverend Bizarre hails from Lohja.

Elias Lönnrot, who wrote the Kalevala, was both born and died in Sammatti, which has been part of Lohja since 2009.

== Sights ==
=== Museums ===
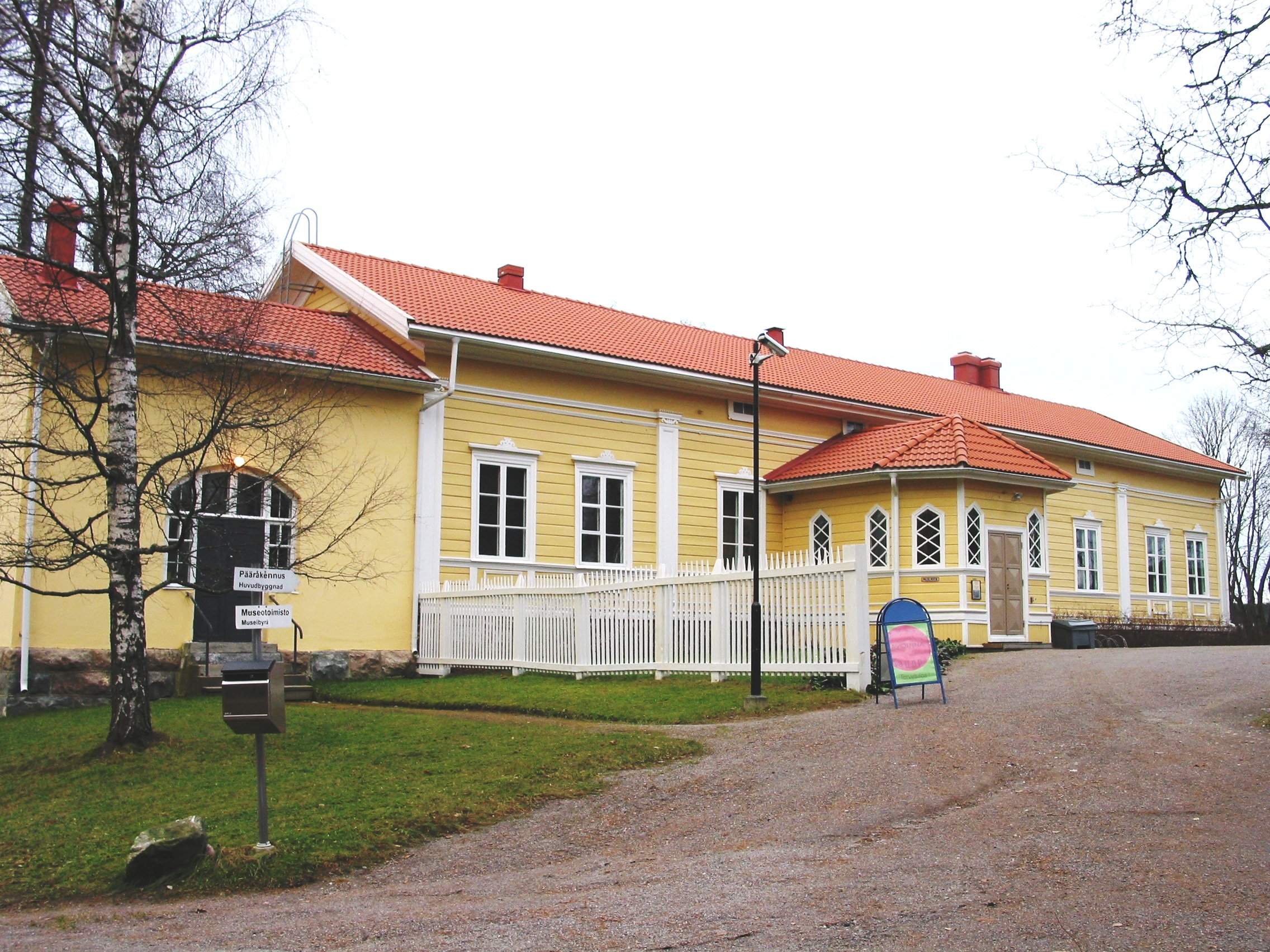
Lohja Museum

- Lohja Museum
- Paikkari Croft, the home of Elias Lönnrot
- Johannes Lohilampi museum
- Tytyri Mine Museum
- Kaarre Military Museum
- Kovela Agricultural Museum
- Hyrsylän Mutka, the home of dancer Aira Samulin
- Nummi Local History Museum
- Pusula Local History Museum

=== Churches ===
- The medieval St. Lawrence's Church
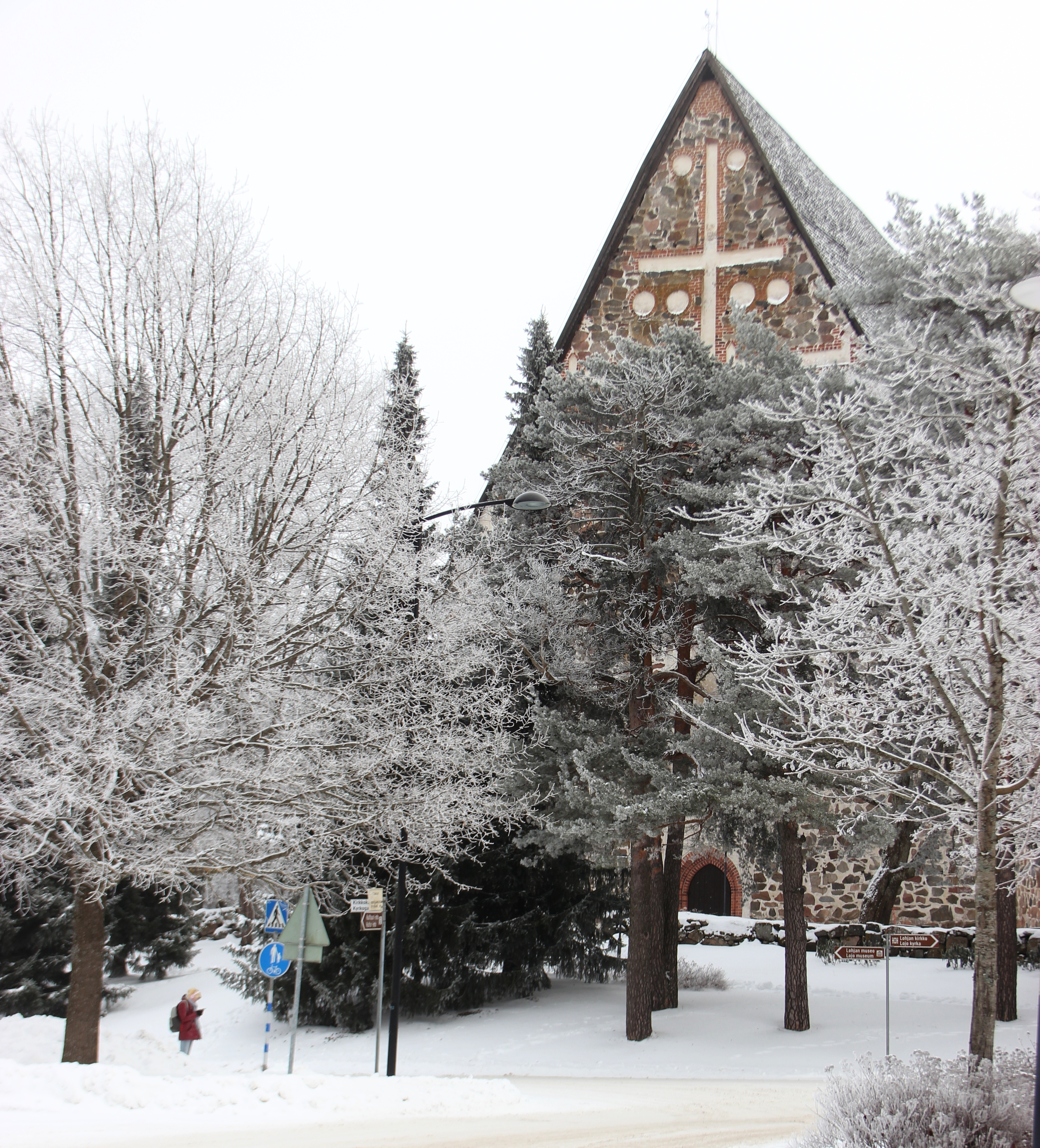
  The Church of St. Lawrence in Lohja
- Karjalohja Church
- Kärkölä Village Church
- Nummi Church
- Pusula Church
- Sammatti Church

=== Other places of interest ===
- Surroundings of Lake Lohjanjärvi
- Alitalo vineyard
- Paavola Oak and nature trail
- Karkali Nature Park
- Lohja Theatre
- Liessaari Nature Trail
- Torhola Cave

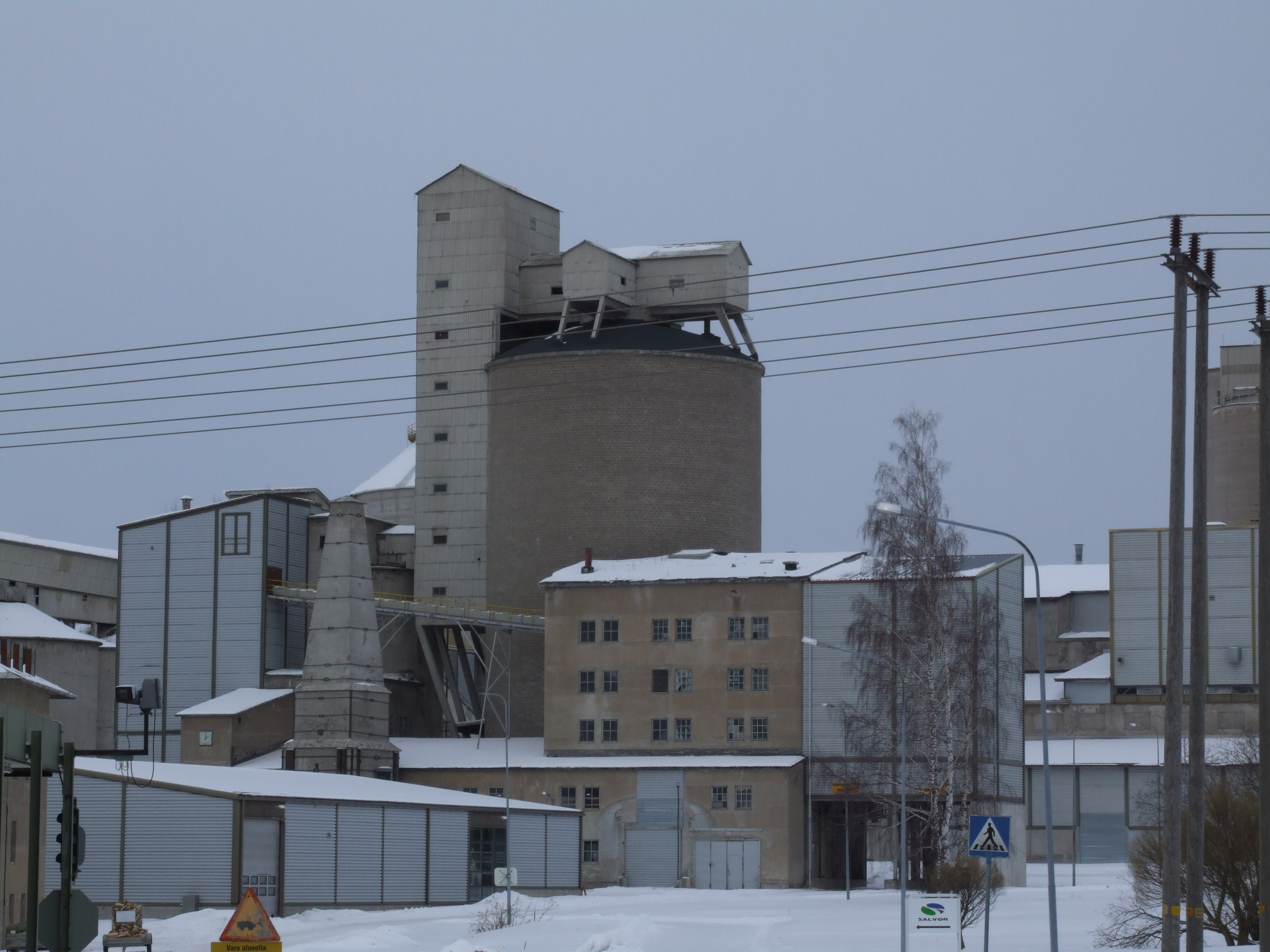
Limestone and cement factory in the Virkkala district, in March 2006

=== Manor Houses ===
- Ojamo Manor
- Kirkniemi Manor
- Kyrkstad Manor
- Laakspohja Manor

== Sports ==
Lohjan Pallo is the football team of the city. Lohja also has an ice hockey team called Lohjan Jääankat.

Kisakallio Sports Institute is located in Lohja. Other important sports venues in the town are Neidonkeidas Indoor Swimming Pool and Lohja Spa Resort in Karjalohja.

== Demographics ==
Population size 1990–2025
Year	Population
1990	41,632
1995	42,499
2000	43,786
2005	45,361
2010	47,341
2015	47,353
2020	45,886
2025	45,435

== Municipal consolidations ==
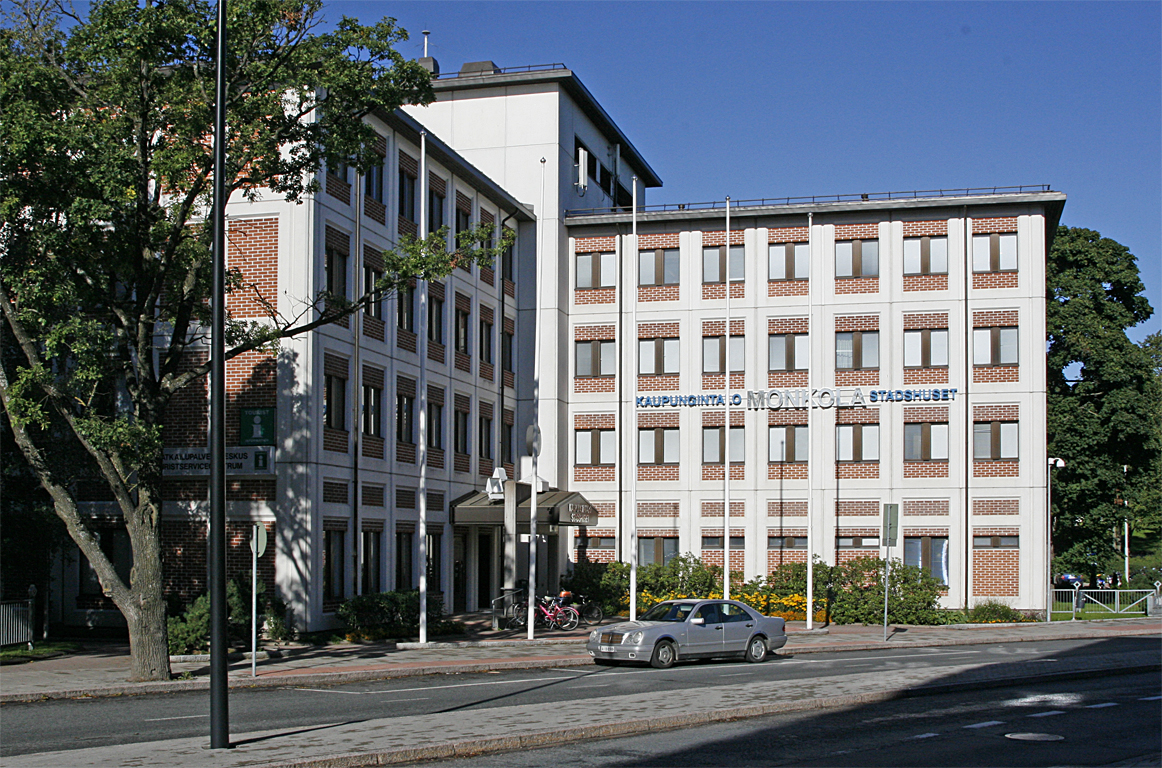
Lohja Town Hall

The municipality of Lohja was consolidated with the city of Lohja in 1997, and the municipality of Sammatti in 2009. The municipalities of Karjalohja and Nummi-Pusula were consolidated with Lohja in 2013.

List of municipal consolidations into Lohja
Municipality	Year
Lohja (municipality)	1997
Sammatti	2009
Karjalohja	2013
Nummi-Pusula	2013

== Local subdivisions ==
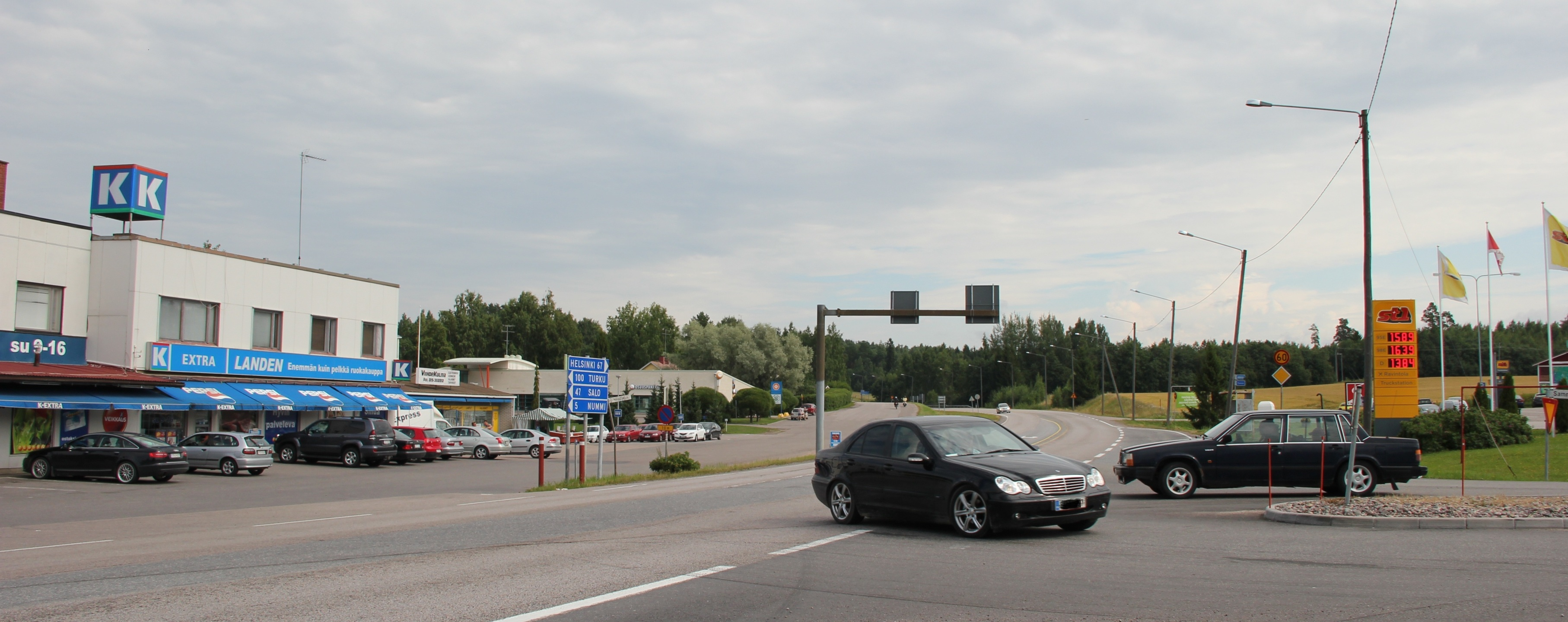
Saukkola in 2011

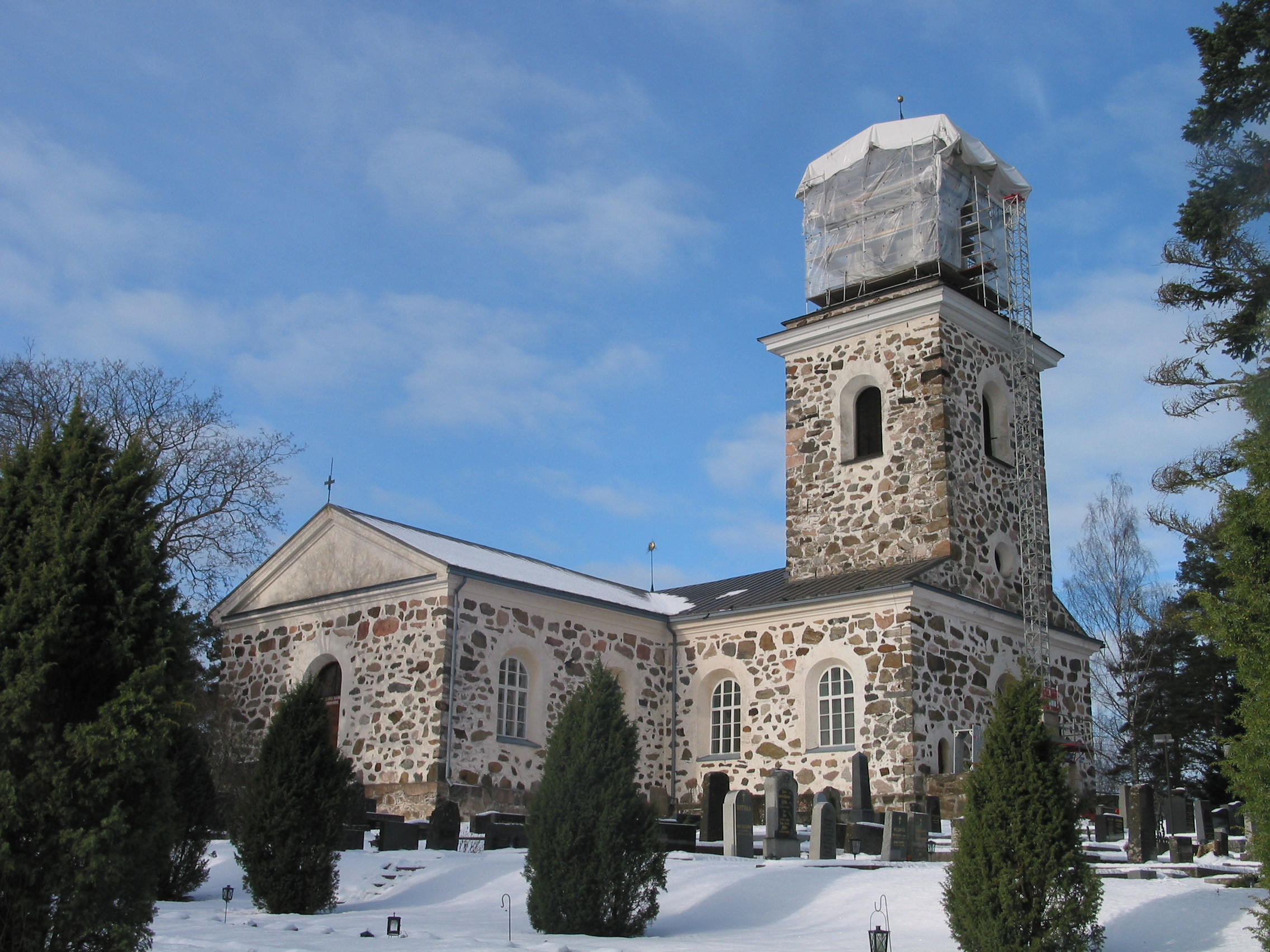
Nummi Church in the Nummi village

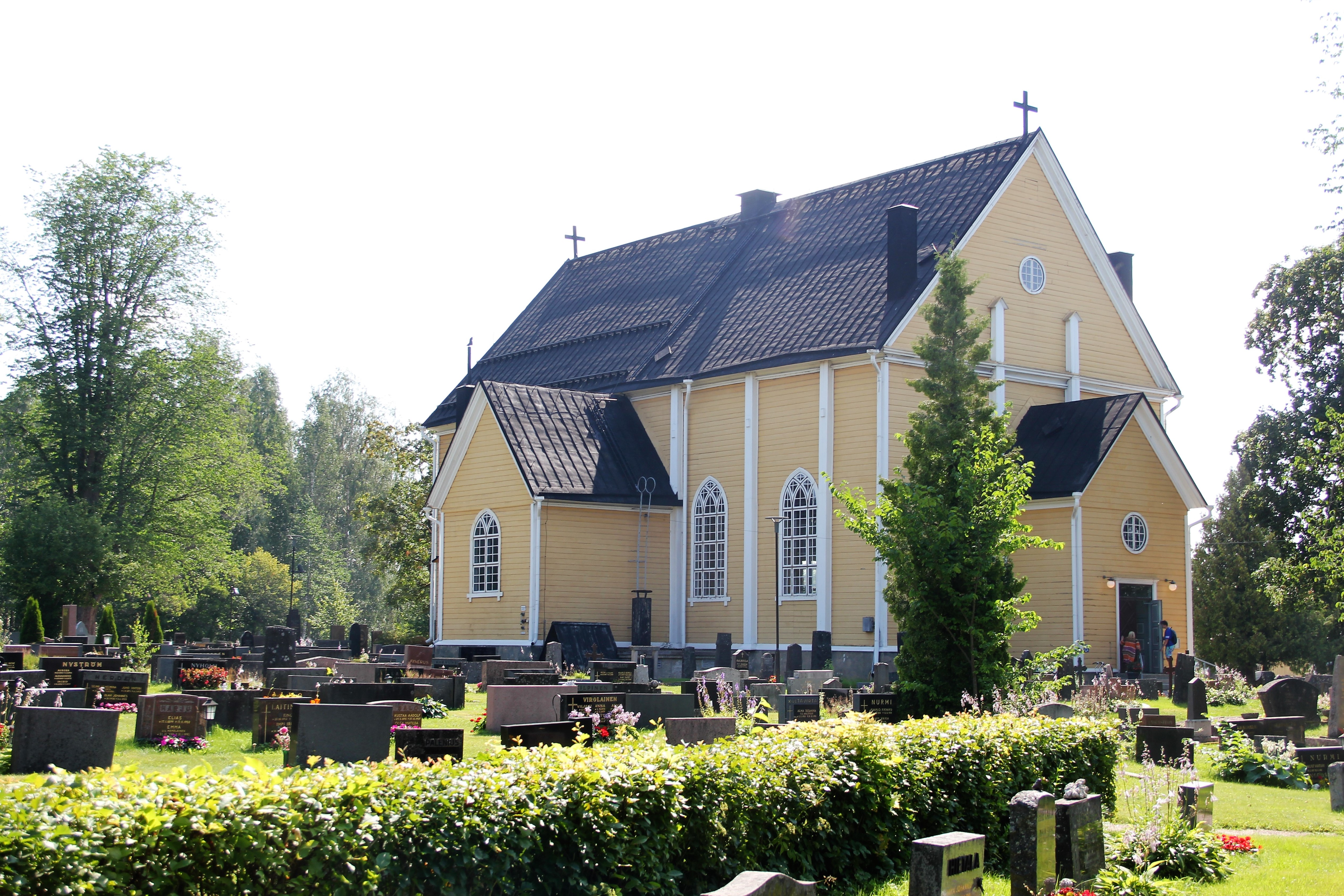
Pusula Church in the Pusula village

A significant part of the city of Lohja is not yet part of any district, since after the 1997 municipal association with the former rural municipality of Lohja.

=== Neighborhoods ===
The official city districts within the city proper of the municipality of Lohja are:

- Ahtsalmi, Anttila, Gruotila, Gunnarla, Hiidensalmi, Immula, Keskilohja, Kirkniemi (Swedish: Gerknäs), Kukkumäki (formerly Luttula, Swedish: Jönsböle), Kirkonkylä (Swedish: Kyrkstad), Lempola, Maksjoki, Metsola, Moisio, Muijala, Myllylampi, Neitsytlinna, Ojamo, Ojamonkangas, Paloniemi (Swedish: Fagernäs), Pappila (Swedish: Prästgården), Pappilankorpi, Perttilä (Swedish: Bertbacka), Pitkäniemi, Routio (Swedish: Routiobacka), Röylä, Sammatti, Vappula (Swedish: Vabby), Ventelä (Swedish: Vendelä), Vienola and Virkkala (Swedish: Virkby).

=== Villages ===
The villages and hamlets of the municipality of Lohja are:

==== Lohja rural ====
- Ahtiala, Askola, Hermala, Hietainen, Hiittinen, Hongisto, Iso-Teutari (Swedish: Stortötar), Jalassaari, Jantoniemi, Kaijola, Karjalohjan Ahtiala, Karjalohjan Pappila, Karkalniemi, Karnainen, Kittilä (Swedish: Kittfall), Koikkala, Kokkila, Korkenoja, Koski, Kouvola, Kunnarla (Swedish: Gunnars), Kutsila, Laakspohja (Swedish: Laxpojo), Lehmijärvi, Lieviö (Swedish: Skräddarskog), Lohjankylä, Lylyinen, Maksjoki, Mynterlä* (Swedish: Mynderlä), Niemi, Nummenkylä, Näätälä (Swedish: Mårbacka), Osuniemi (Swedish: Orsnäs), Outamo, Paavola, Paksalo, Pauni, Pietilä, Piispala (Swedish: Biskopsnäs), Pulli, Seräjärvi, Skraatila, Suittila, Särkijärvi, Talpela, Torhola, Vaanila, Valla, Vanhakylä, Varola, Vasarla, Veijola (Swedish: Vejby), Virkkala (Swedish: Virkby), Vohloinen, Vähä-Teutari (Swedish: Lilltötar) and Yli-Immola.

==== Sammatti ====
- Haarijärvi (Haarjärvi), Karstu, Kaukola, Kiikala, Leikkilä, Lohilampi, Luskala, Myllykylä, Niemenkylä and Sammatti

==== Karjalohja ====
- Härjänvatsa, Ilmoniemi, Immola, Karkali, Kattelus, Kourjoki, Kuusia, Kärkelä, Lohjantaipale, Lönnhammar (Linhamari), Maila, Makkarjoki, Murto, Mustlahti, Nummijärvi, Pappila, Pellonkylä, Pipola, Pitkälahti (Långvik), Puujärvi, Pyöli, Saarenpää, Sakkola, Suurniemi, Särkjärvi, Tallaa and Tammisto

==== Nummi ====
- Haarla, Hakula, Heijala, Heimola, Huhti, Hyrsylä, Hyvelä, Immola, Jakova, Järvenpää, Jättölä, Korkianoja, Kovela, Leppäkorpi, Luttula, Maikkala, Maskila, Mettula, Miemola, Millola, Mommola, Mäntsälä, Nummi Church Village, Näkkilä, Oinola, Oittila, Pakkala, Pälölä, Raatti, Remala, Retlahti, Röhkölä, Salo, Saukkola, Sierla, Sitarla, Tavola, Varttila and Vivola

==== Pusula ====
- Ahonpää, Hattula, Hauhula, Herrala, Hirvijoki, Hyrkkölä, Hyönölä, Ikkala, Karisjärvi, Kaukela, Koisjärvi, Kärkölä, Marttila, Mäkkylä, Pusula, Radus, Seppälä, Suomela, Uusikylä, Viiala and Vörlö

== Twin towns ==
Lohja is twinned with:

- Växjö, Sweden
- Ringerike, Norway
- Aabenraa, Denmark
- Skagaströnd, Iceland
- Sátoraljaújhely, Hungary
- Kalush, Ukraine

== Notable people ==
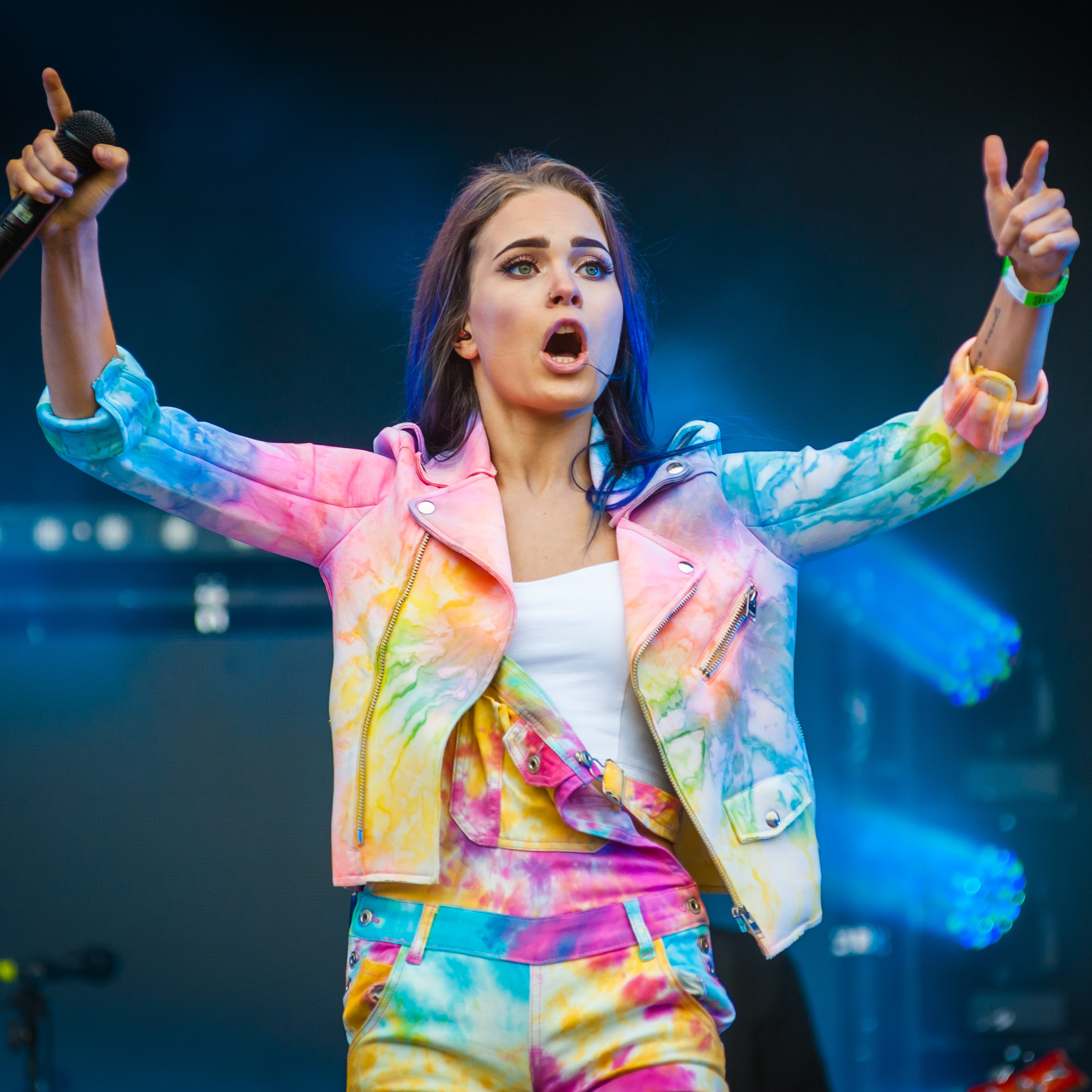
Sanni, 2016

- Eeva Joenpelto (1921-2004), autor
- Marjo Matikainen-Kallström (born 1965), politician and cross-country skier
- Marjut Rolig (* 1966), cross-country skier (gold at 1992 Winter Olympics)
- Tomi Joutsen (* 1976), singer
- Sanna Stén (* 1977), rower (silver at 2008 Summer Olympics)
- Laura Mononen (* 1984), cross-country skier
- Henri Laaksonen (* 1992) professional tennis player
- Jenni Vähämaa (* 1992), figure skater
- Sanni Kurkisuo (* 1993), singer, songwirter and actress
- Tuukka Taponen (* 2006), racing driver

== See also ==
=== Districts of Lohja ===
- Saukkola
- Virkkala

=== Neighbourhooding municipalities ===
- Ingå
- Siuntio
- Vihti
