= Lohja Museum =

Coordinates: 60.2564°N 24.0709°E

- Lohjan museo / Lojo museum
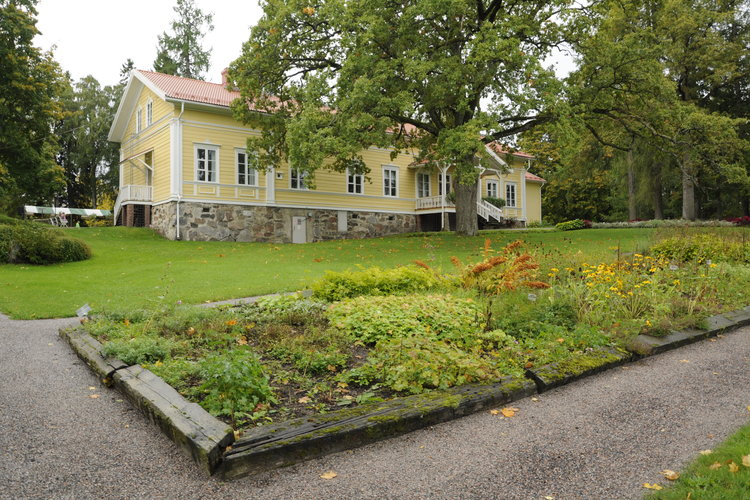
- The main building of Lohja Museum, the old vicarage.
- Established: 1911
- Location: Lohja, Uusimaa region, Finland
- Type: Local history museum
- Collection size: 25 000
- Founder: Lohjan Kotiseutututkimuksen Ystävär ry
- Owner: City of Lohja
- Parking: On site (no charge)
- Website: https://www.lohja.fi/vapaa-aika-liikunta/lohjan-museo/

Lohja Museum (Finnish: Lohjan museo, Swedish: Lojo museum) is a local history museum in Lohja, Finland. The museum is housed in an old vicarage near the medieval St. Lawrence's Church. It was founded in 1911 and boasts a collection of around 25,000 items and tens of thousands of photos.

Additionally, Lohja Museum operates a local history archive and library, and visitors can enter the museum with Finnish Museum Card.

== History ==
In 1894, Robert Boldt founded Finland's first local heritage organisation in Lohja, called Lohjan Kotiseutututkimuksen Ystävät ry. Within the organisation, the idea of a museum began to take shape. Lohja Museum was officially founded in 1911, and in 1978, The City of Lohja, together with the rural Municipality of Lohja, assumed responsibility for the museum's management. They rented the old vicarage from Lohja Parish, which had been unused, to serve as the main building for the museum.

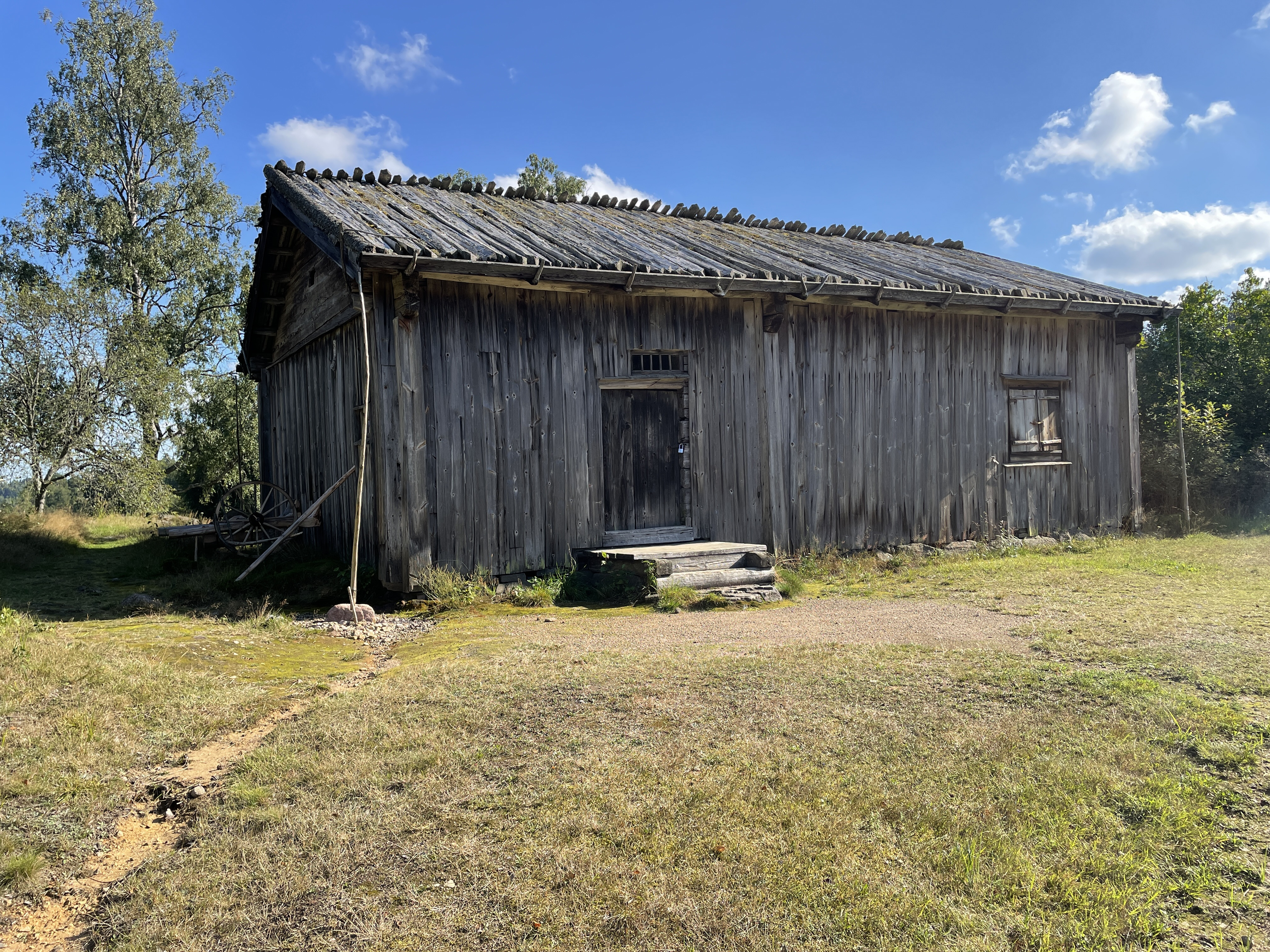
Paikkari Croft, house of Elias Lönnrot.

In addition to the main museum located by the Lohja Vicarage, the museum also oversees the house museum of Elias Lönnrot, Paikkari Croft, in Sammatti, and the Johannes Lohilampi Museum, also in Sammatti. Temporary exhibitions are also held at the Lohja Main Library.
