= Museum card =

Museum card may refer to:

- Museum card (Finland)
- Museumkaart, in the Netherlands
