= Nummi Church =

Coordinates: 60.3954°N 23.8795°E

- Nummen kirkko / Nummis kyrka
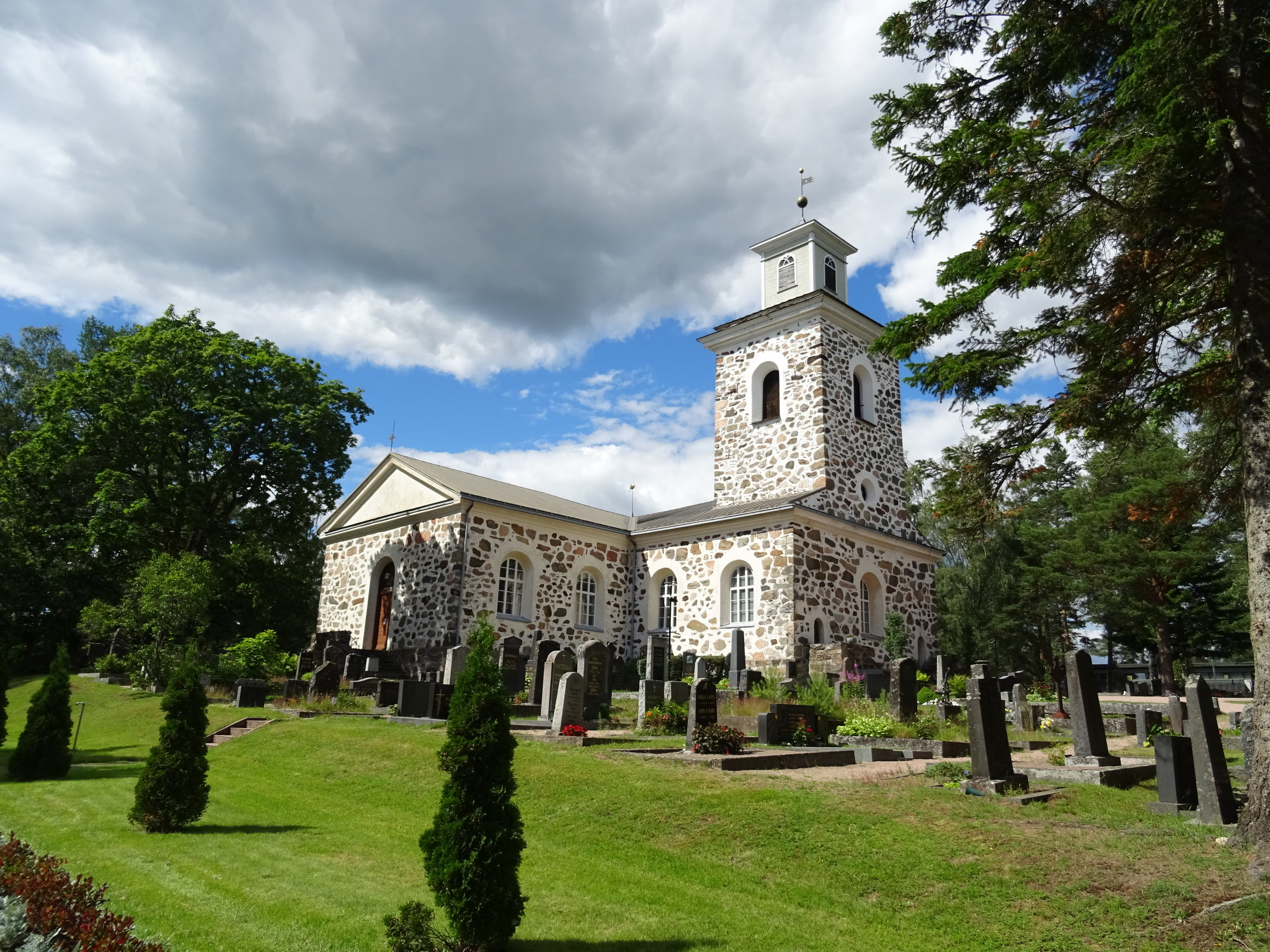
- Nummi Church in 2020.
- Nummi Church
- Location: Nummi, Lohja, Uusimaa Region
- Country: Finland
- Denomination: Lutheran
- Religious institute: Evangelical Lutheran Church of Finland
- Website: https://www.lohjanseurakunta.fi

Architecture
- Heritage designation: Protected by law
- Architect: Abraham Niclas Edelcrantz
- Style: Neoclassicism
- Completed: 1822

Administration
- Diocese: Diocese of Espoo
- Parish: Lohja Parish

Nummi Church (Finnish: Nummen kirkko, Swedish: Nummis kyrka) is a Lutheran stone church in the former municipality of Nummi, situated in the Finnish city of Lohja in the Uusimaa region. Constructed of gray stone in 1822, the church was designed by Abraham Niklas Edelcrantz at the Royal Intendent's Office in Stockholm in 1807.

Nummi Church is located in the Diocese of Espoo and is owned by Lohja Parish. It is the largest church in the parish in terms of seating capacity.

== History and architecture ==
Nummi Church represents the neoclassical style and was completed in 1822. The current stone church replaced a 17th-century wooden church, which stood at the old graveyard of Nummi. Nothing remains of the former church except for a sacristy made of gray stone.

The church is shaped like a cross, with a tall bell tower attached to the eastern wall. The bell tower is adorned with a weathervane depicting the sun and the moon. On the roof's ridge, there are three crosses and a blazing sun, symbolising God's righteousness.

In 1922, following the church's centenary celebration, it underwent a significant restoration. During this restoration, the shape of the benches was altered, and the doors to the bench rows were removed. Additionally, stained glass windows designed by architect Ilmari Launis were installed in the choir of the church. The window on the southern wall depicts the death and suffering of Christ, while the window on the northern wall of the choir portrays Christ as victorious and as a king.

In the summer of 2008, lightning struck the bell tower of Nummi Church, igniting several fires there. The fire department was alerted to the church after the church caretaker called the emergency number shortly after four in the morning. The lightning strike had caused a malfunction in the automatic fire detection system, rendering the fire alarms inoperable. The church caretaker received a fault notification on his phone, which enabled him to call the fire department after climbing to the top of the Nummi Church tower to assess the situation.

As a result of the fire, the outer shell of the wooden hat of the tower had to be replaced.

=== Decoration and Points of Interest ===
The two-part altarpiece was painted in 1825 by Axel Johan Fägerplan in Stockholm. In one panel, Jesus is depicted at the Last Supper, and in the other, Jesus is portrayed crucified

The pulpit of Nummi Church dates back to the wooden church built in 1635, which was later dismantled.

The facade of the organ, manufactured in 1864 by Gustaf Normann's organ factory in Tallinn, Estonia, still remains in the church, but its pipes are not operational. New organ were made by Kangasala Organ Factory in 1973, comprising 20 sets of pipes.

The oldest item in Nummi Church is a large crucifix, acquired from St. Lawrence's Church in Lohja, made in the late 1300s.

The church textiles were made by Impi Laaksonen in 1974.

Nummi Martha Association made the wedding ryijy for the church in 1955.

=== Cemeteries ===
The old cemetery dates back to the 1600s. A newer one was established in the 1820s. The latest one was inaugurated on October 4, 2009. The memorial for fallen soldiers, depicting a wounded soldier wading through snow, was designed by Emil Filén in 1951.

== Images ==
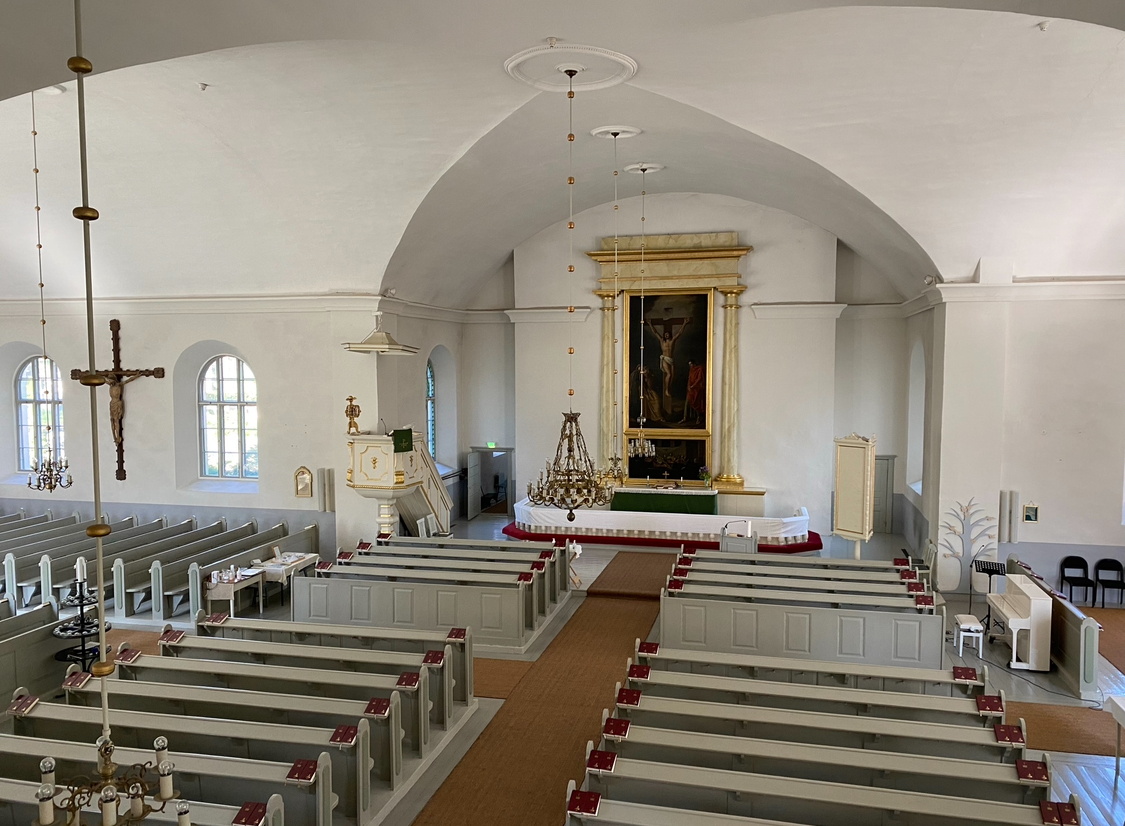
Church hall.

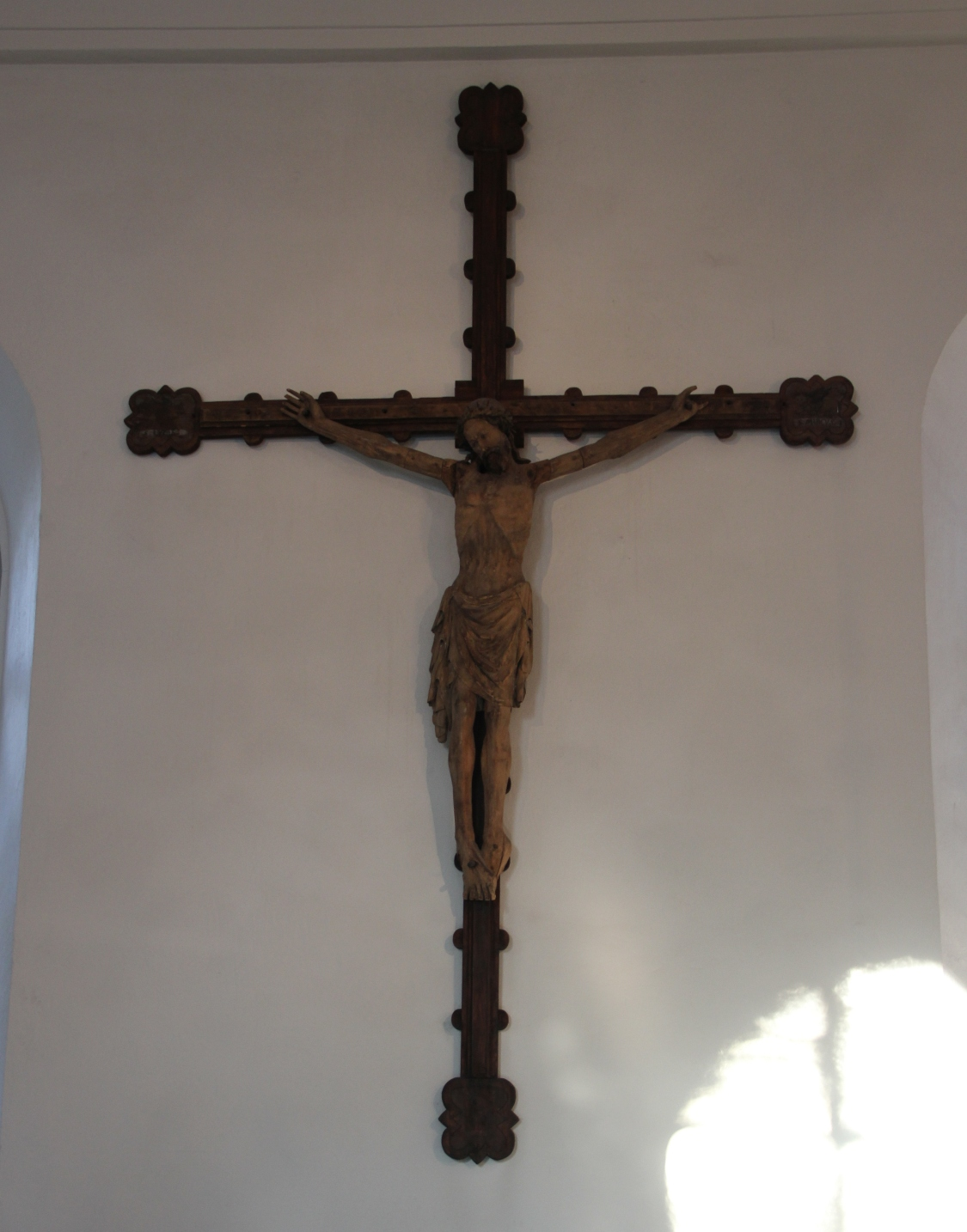
Medieval crucifix.

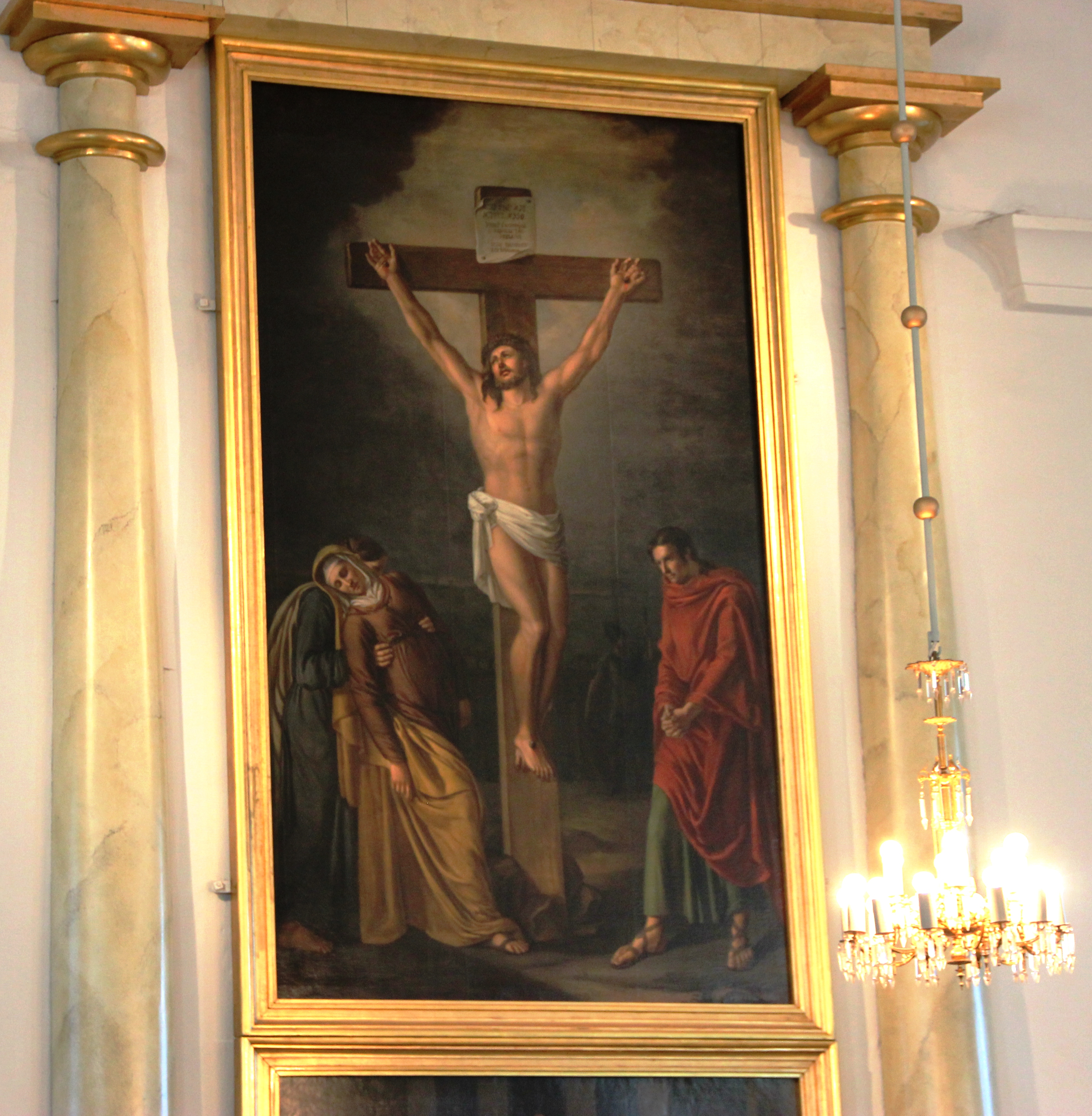
The altar painting.

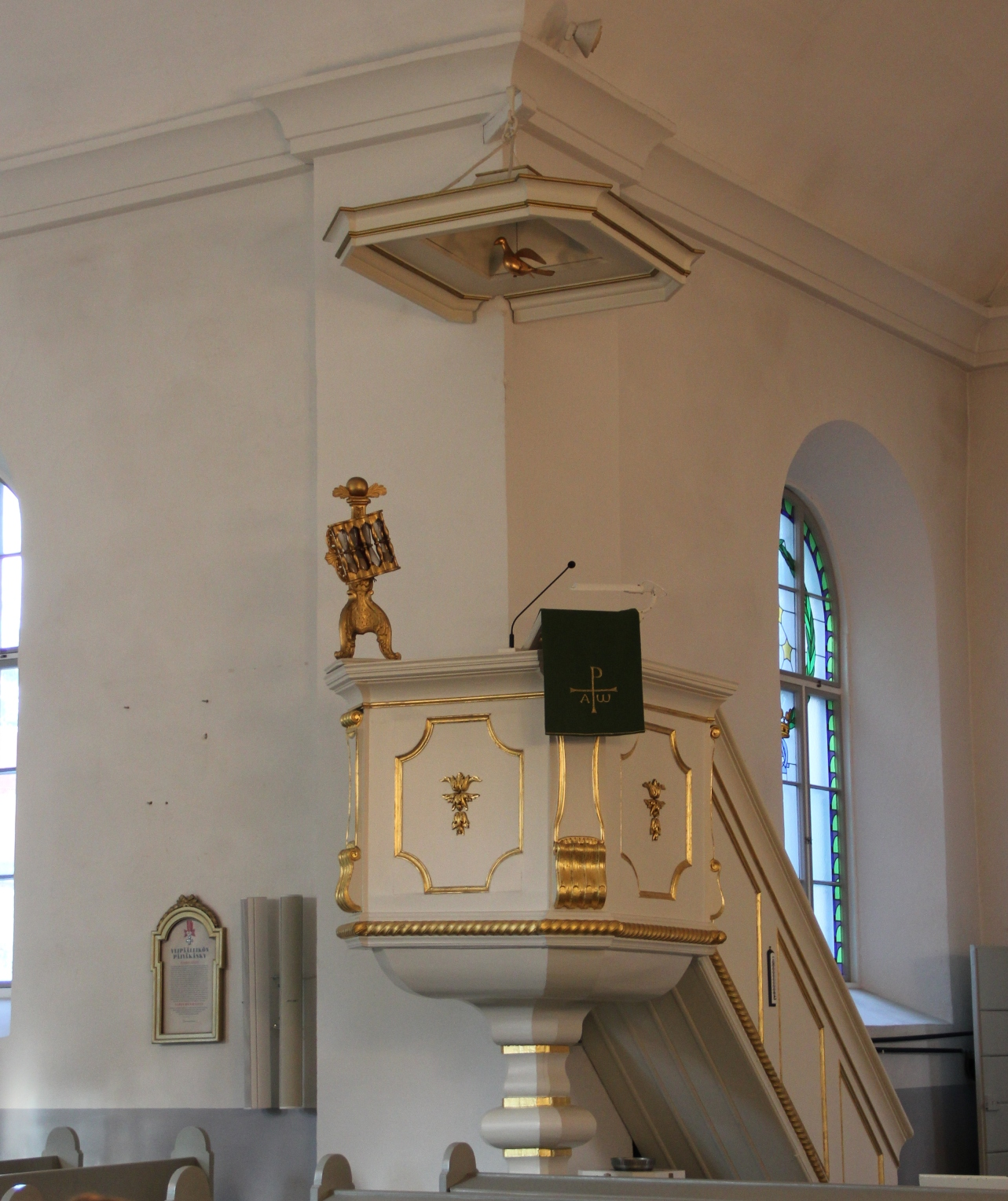
The pulpit.

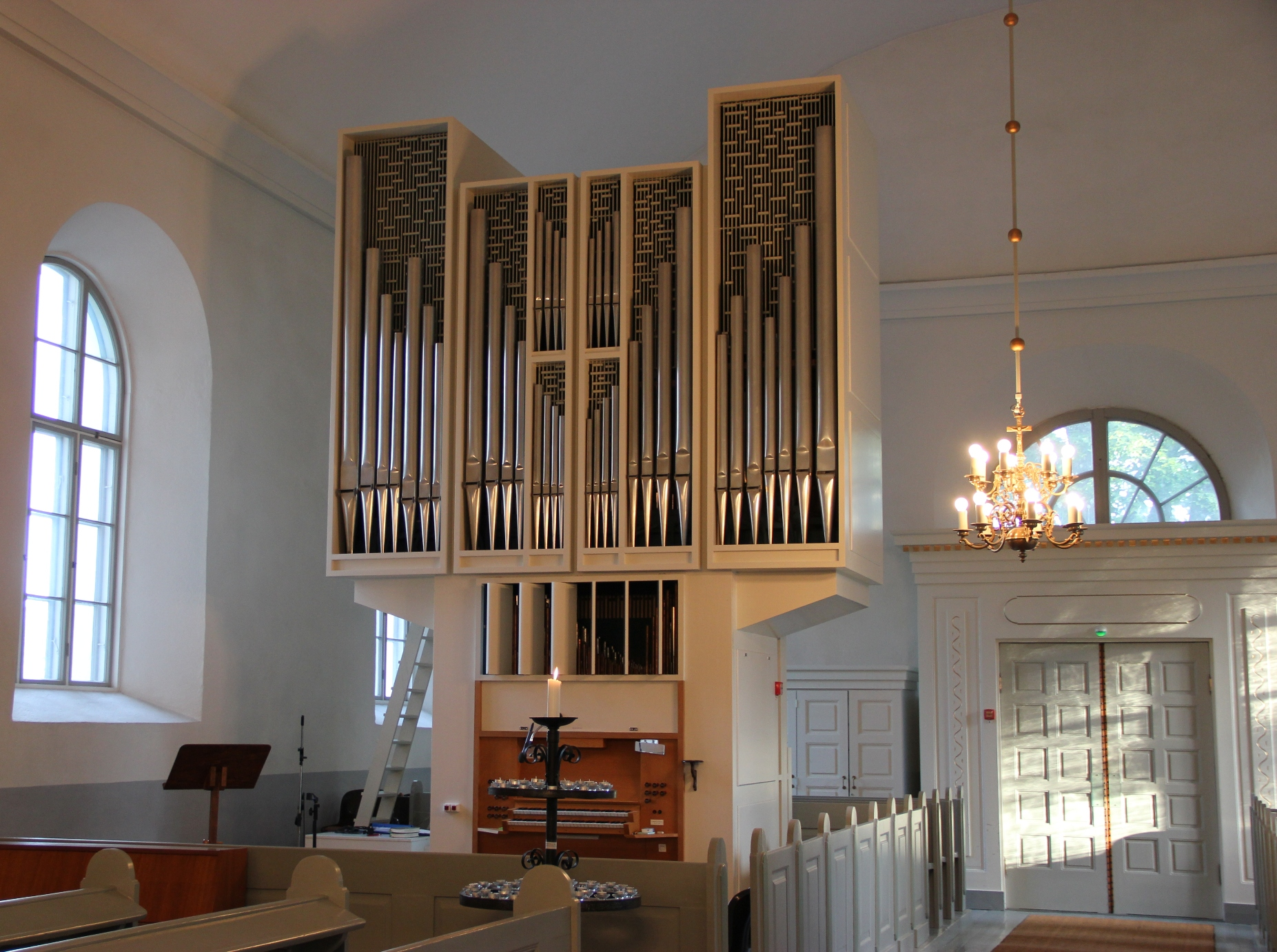
The newer organ.

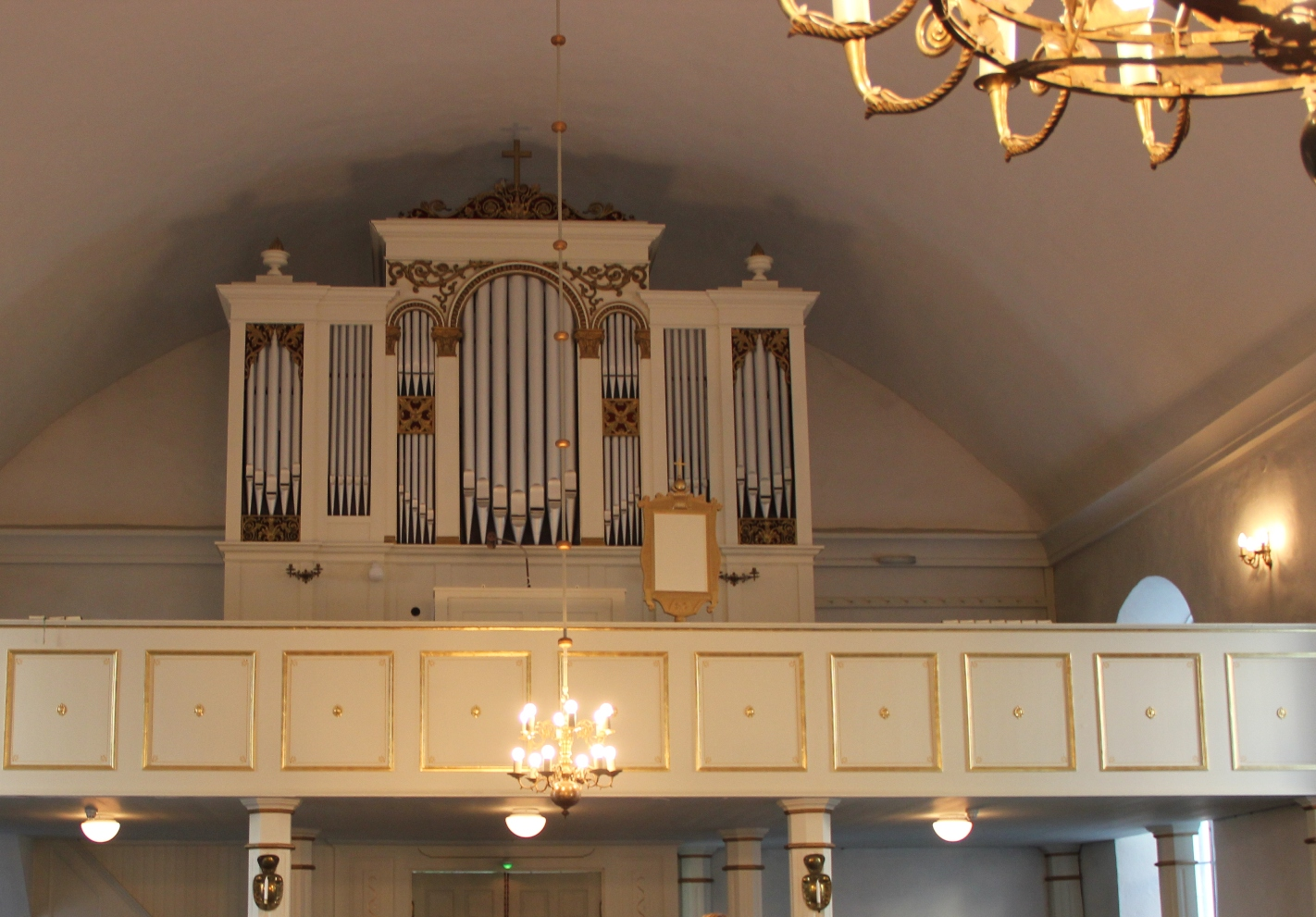
The older organ.

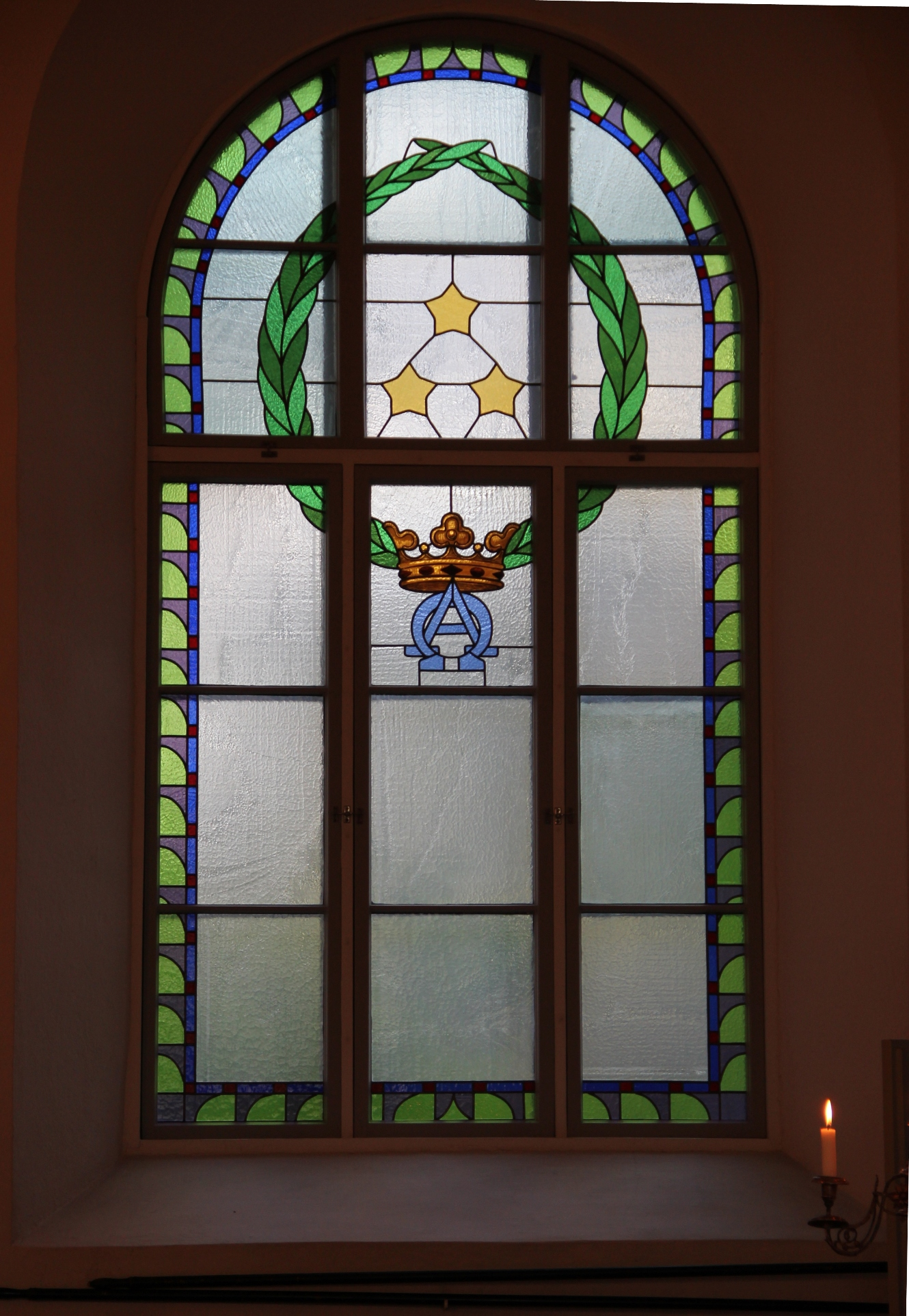
One of the stained glass windows.

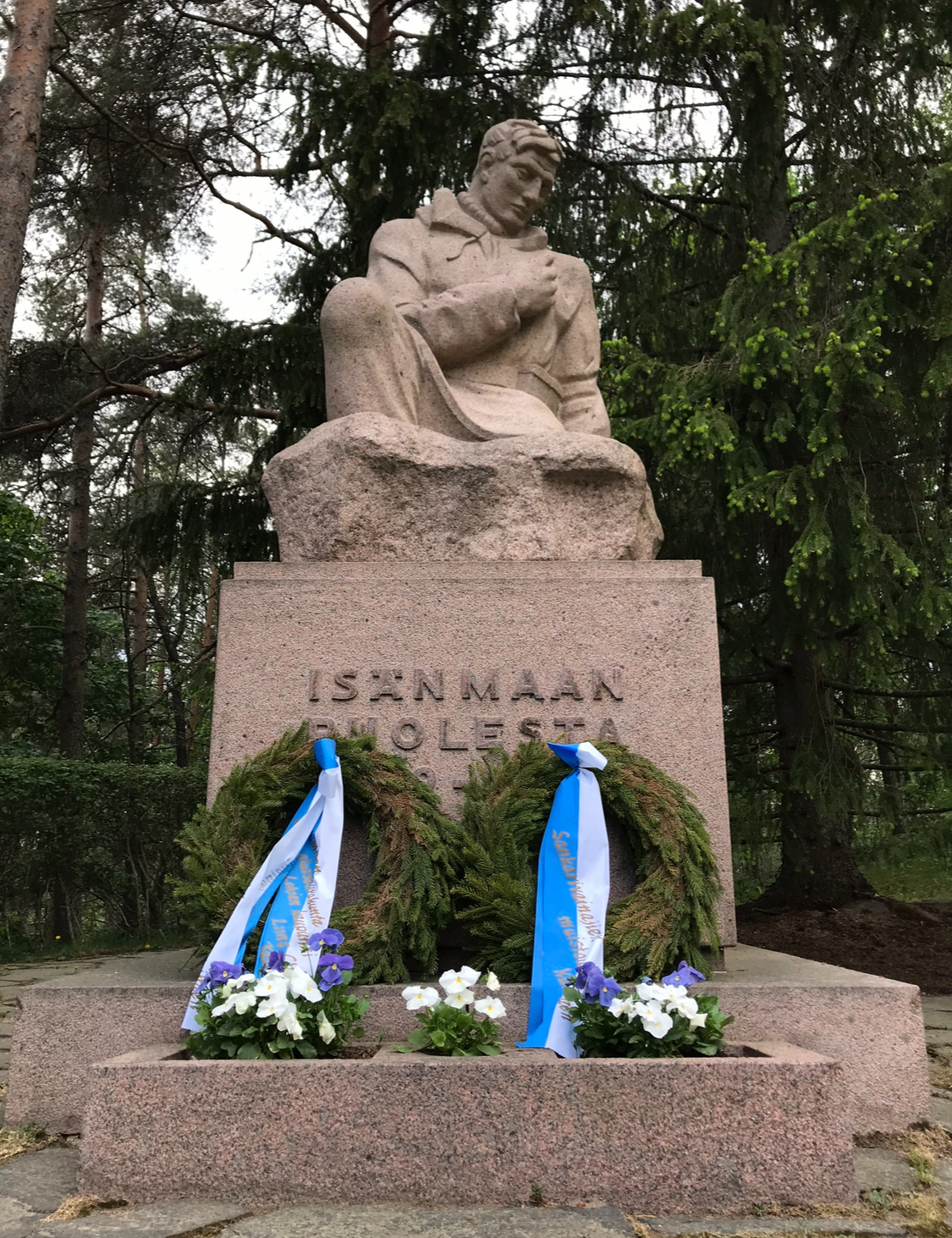
Memorial sculpture at the military graveyard.

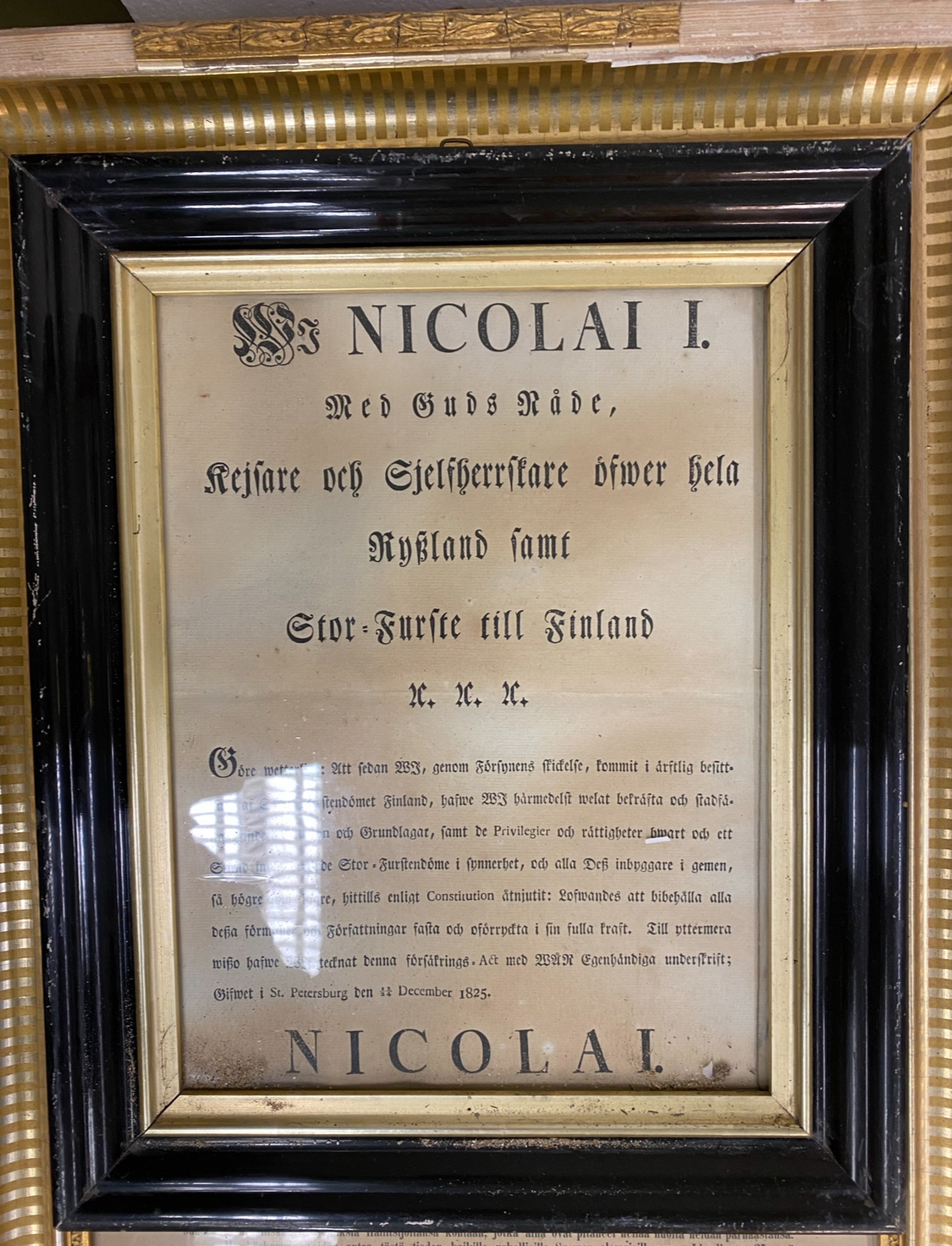
Pledge from Emperor Nicholas I at the start of his reign.

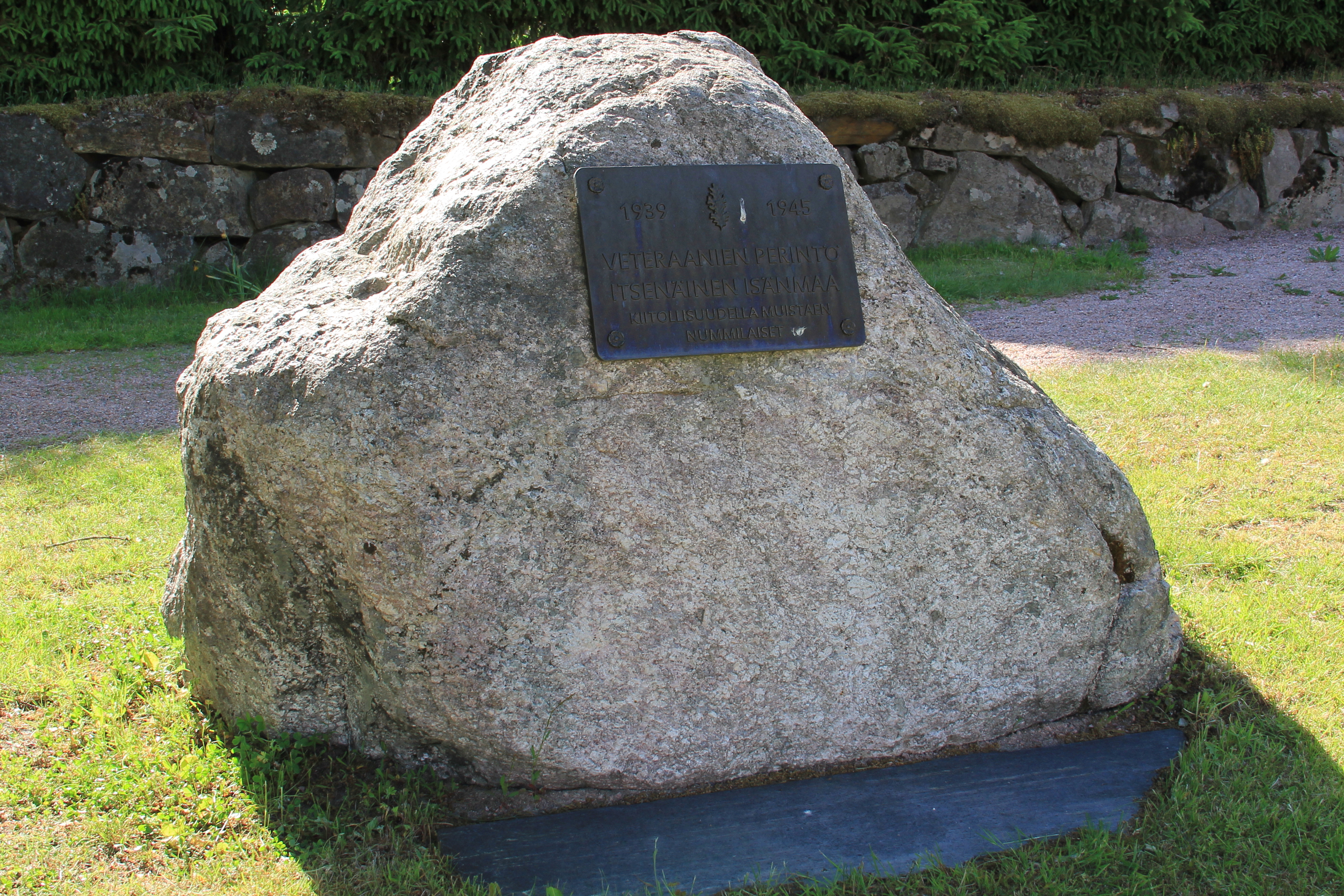
Veteran stone.
