= Pusula Church =

Church in Uusimaa, Finland

Pusula Church Pusulan kirkko Pusula kyrka
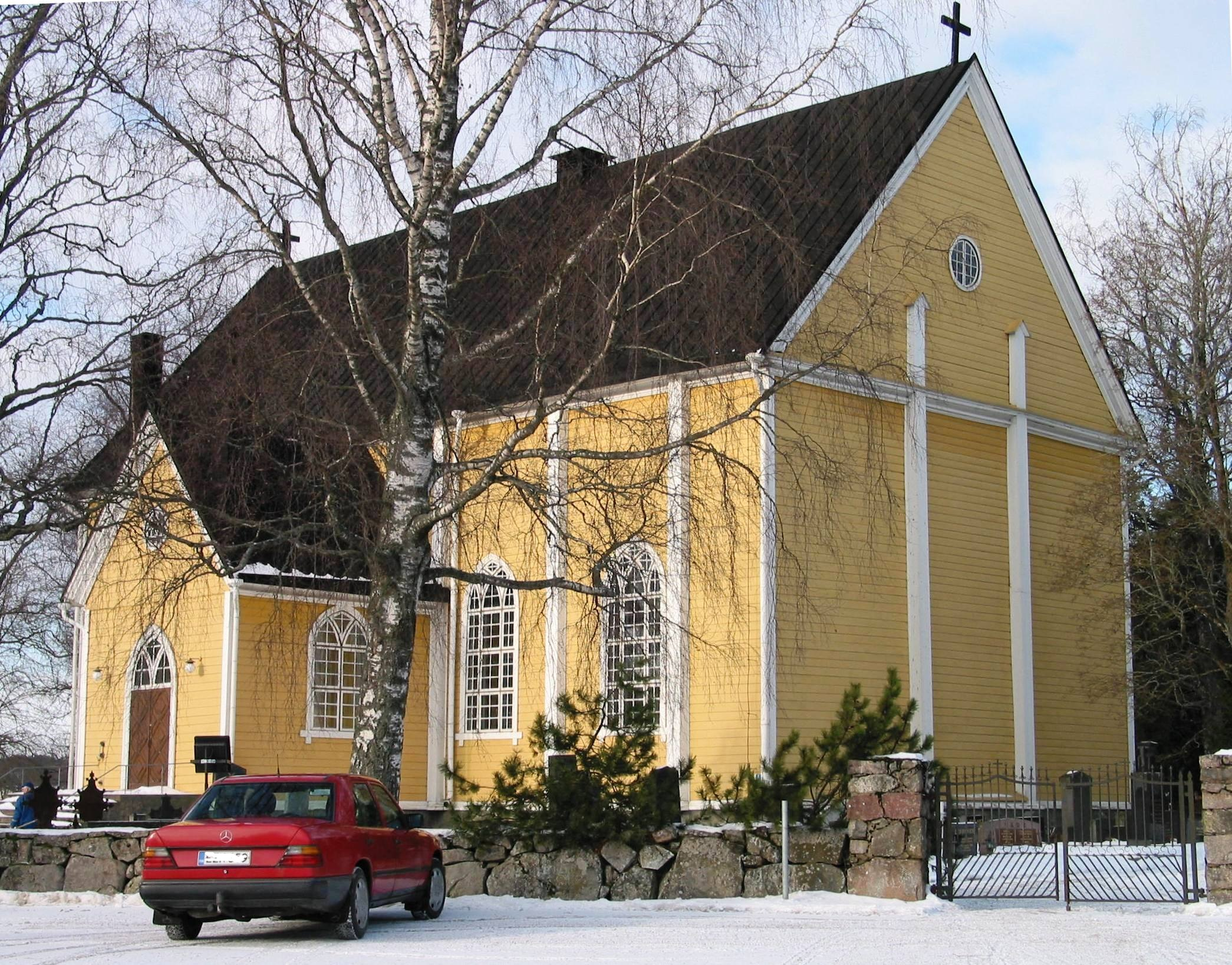
- Pusula Church in February 2009

Religion
- Affiliation: Evangelical Lutheran Church of Finland
- Ecclesiastical or organizational status: Church (building)

Location
- Location: Pusula, Lohja, Finland
- Interactive map of Pusula Church; Pusulan kirkko Pusula kyrka
- Coordinates: 60°28′24.96″N 23°58′59.88″E

Architecture
- Architect: Carl Ludvig Engel
- Completed: 1838

Specifications
- Capacity: 750
- Materials: Wood

Pusula Church (Finnish: Pusulan kirkko; Swedish: Pusula kyrka) is a wooden church located in the Pusula village in Lohja, Finland. The church was designed by Carl Ludvig Engel and it was built by master builder Henrik Andsten. The church was completed in 1838. After its completion, structural problems appeared in the church, as its walls could not withstand the weight of the roof, so the roof had to be lowered by 8 meters. The repair work was done in 1858-59.

The altarpiece of the church was painted by Felix Frang from Urjala in 1921.

The church's pipe organ was manufactured by the Kangasala organ factory in 1936. Most of the organ pipes were taken from the church's previous organs, which were manufactured by the Tallinn-based Normann organ factory.
