= Pusula (village) =

- Village
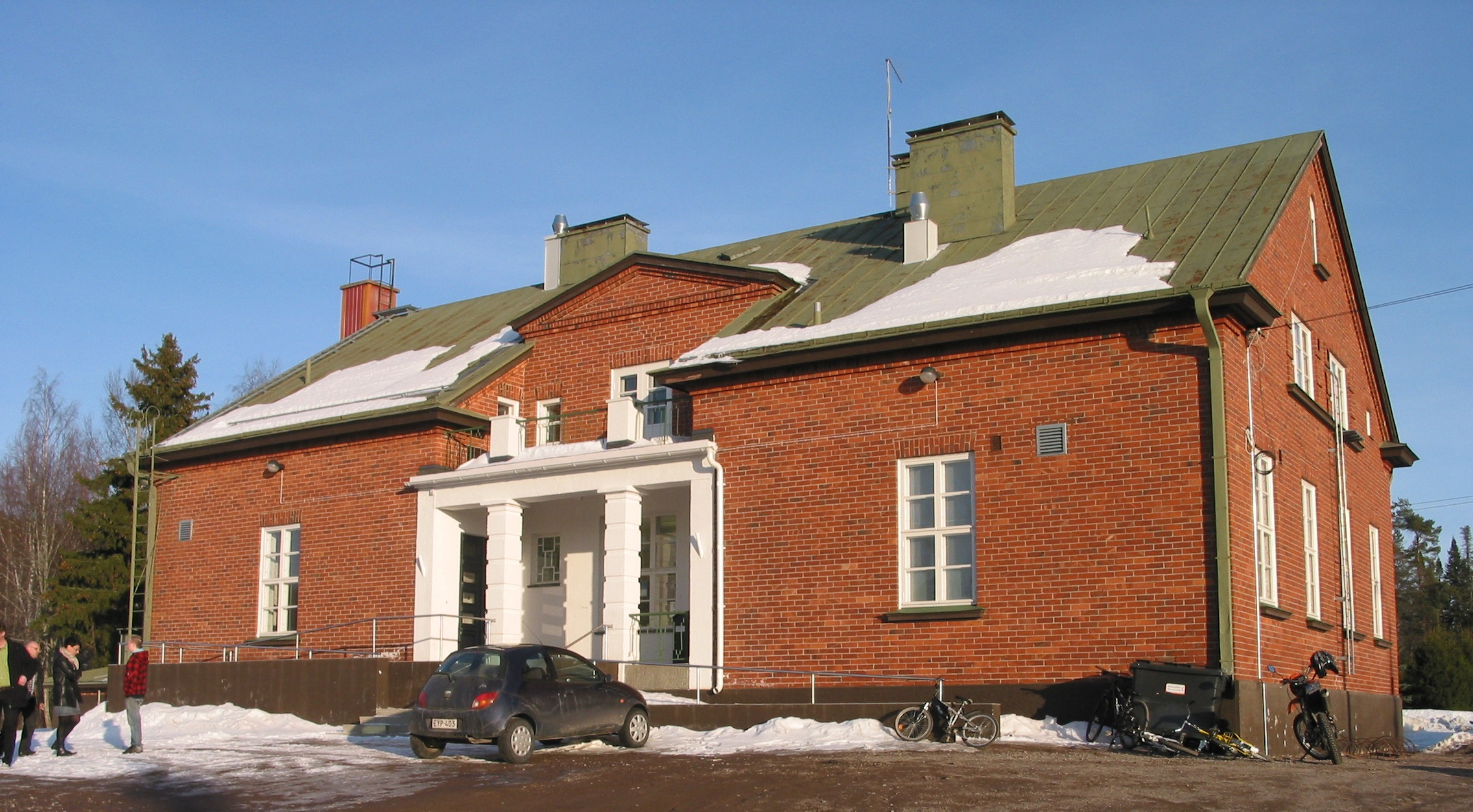
- The Pusula Library

- Location in Finland
- Coordinates: 60°28′22″N 23°58′53″E
- Country: Finland
- Region: Uusimaa
- Municipality: Lohja
- Subdivision: Nummi-Pusula

Area
  - Total: 1.97 km^{2} (0.76 sq mi)

Population (31 December 2020)
  - Total: 741
  - Density: 3,761/km^{2} (9,740/sq mi)
- Time zone: UTC+2 (EET)
  - Summer (DST): UTC+3 (EEST)
- Postal code: 03850

Pusula is a village in the city of Lohja in Uusimaa, Finland. It was former administrative center of the former Pusula municipality. It has over 700 inhabitants. Lake Pusula (Pusulanjärvi) is located on the southern edge of the village.

Pusula church, a Sale grocery store, village shopping center PikkuOmena, health center, hardware store, gas station, car service, pharmacy, fire station, library, museum and elementary school are located in the village. Pusula's old town hall was sold to a private person in 2007 and is currently in residential use. Some buildings in the village were used in the television crime drama Helsinki Syndrome (2022).

== See also ==
- Karkkila
- Nummi-Pusula
- Saukkola
- Vihti
