= Leppäkorpi (Nummi) =

Leppäkorpi Leppäkorpi
- Village
- Location of Leppäkorpi in Finland
- Coordinates: 60°28′32″N 23°49′21″E
- Country: Finland
- Province: Southern Finland
- Region: Uusimaa
- Municipality: Lohja

Population
  - Total: Under 500
- Time zone: UTC+3:00
- Postal code: 09930

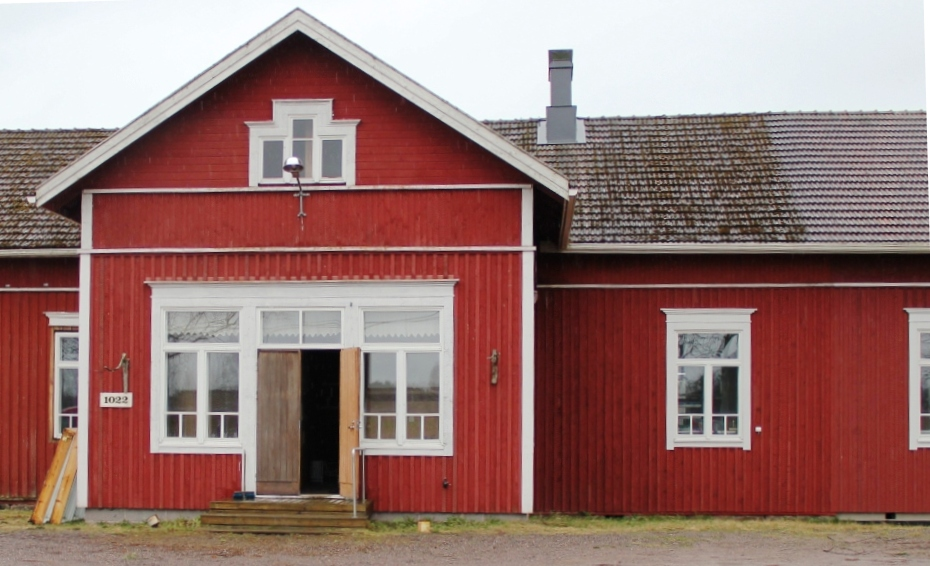
House in Leppäkorpi, Lohja

Leppäkorpi is a sparsely populated rural village in the municipality of Lohja, Finland. The village contains a workers' hall, a shop, a day-care, and a bus stop. The river Pitkiönjoki runs through the village. The lake Iso-Palmottu is a small lake near the edges of the village. The Finnish company Akiro Oy is based in Leppäkorpi.
