= Paikkari Croft =

Coordinates: 60°21′08″N 23°48′18″E

- Paikkarin torppa / Paikkari torp
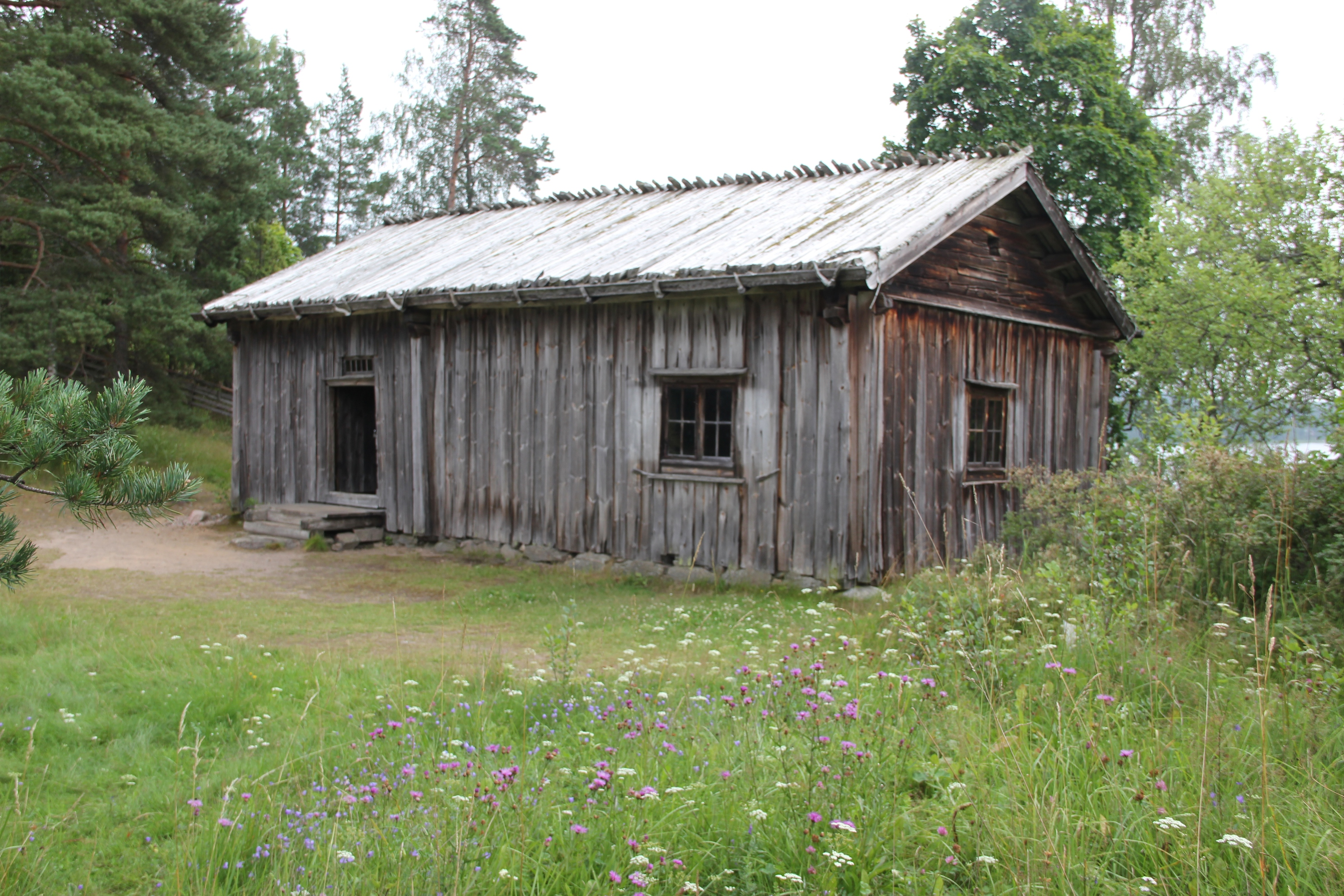
- Established: 1887
- Location: Sammatti, Finland
- Type: House museum
- Owner: The State of Finland
- Nearest parking: On site

Paikkari Croft (Finnish: Paikkarin torppa, Swedish: Paikkari torp) is a 19th-century croft in Sammatti, Finland. The croft is known as the childhood home of Elias Lönnrot, the creator of the Finnish national epic Kalevala.

== History ==
Paikkari Croft was built by the lake Valkjärvi to house tailor Fredrik Johan Lönnrot and his family around the year 1800. Elias Lönnrot was born in Paikkari Croft in 1802 and lived there until 1814 when he left for school in Ekenäs.

The croft was bought by the state of the Grand Duchy of Finland in 1889. The croft had functioned as a museum since 1887. It was originally managed by the Finnish Heritage Agency. In 2014, the ownership of the Senate Properties, a government-owned property management organisation. The same year Paikkari Croft fell under the management of Lohja Museum. Paikkari Croft is open to visitors during the summer months and houses a collection of items related to Lönnrot, such as Lönnrot's cradle and a kantele, a Finnish instrument that he used. Visitors can enter the museum with the Finnish Museum Card.

== Ownership and Museum Development ==
In 2014, ownership of the house was transferred from the Finnish National Board of Antiquities to the Senate property.

== See also ==
- Elias Lönnrot
- Kalevala
