= The Regional Organisation of Enterprises in Helsinki =

The Regional Organisation of Enterprises in Helsinki was founded in 1939 and is an organisation of more than 6300 business owners in Helsinki, Finland. It is one of the 21 regional organisations of the Federation of Finnish Enterprises, which has the largest membership of all business-related federations in Finland.

The mission of the organisation is to create a favourable enterprise climate and provide its members with information, mentoring, networking, events and educational opportunities.

== The Regions and Young Entrepreneurs Network ==
The Regional Organisation of Enterprises in Helsinki is divided into 7 regions:

- Helsingin Vanhankaupungin Yrittäjät
- Itä-Helsingin Yrittäjät
- Kanta-Helsingin Yrittäjät
- Koillis-Helsingin Yrittäjät
- Helsingin Yrittäjät Töölö ry
- Lauttasaaren Yrittäjät and
- Länsi-Helsingin Yrittäjät

In addition, the organisation has its own informal network HYNY for entrepreneurs less than 35 years of age. Founded in 2006, HYNY helps young entrepreneurs to learn and grow, leading to greater business success. For its members HYNY provides training, events and networking opportunities.

== History ==
The founding meeting of the Regional Organisation of Enterprises in Helsinki was held 10 January 1939. At that time the members consisted mainly of industry associations but soon more and more independent entrepreneurs became members.

Due to the change in regulations in 1962, the name of the organisation was changed to Suur-Helsingin Yrittäjät ry and the organisational activities and number of members increased. Caused by the strong development of the region, several structural solutions were implemented and organisation's activities took their current form. In addition, Espoo and Vantaa founded their own regional organisations in 1979, thus the responsibilities of these strongly developing and growing regions were divided and organisational activities redefined.

The original mission statement: bring entrepreneurs together, influence and safeguard the common interests, has never changed its core. The most significant change is its key function: the nature of the organisation as an information, mentoring, networking, events and educational opportunities provider for its members.

In 2009 the Regional Organisation of Enterprises in Helsinki celebrated its 70th anniversary. In the same year the organisation hosted the National Entrepreneur's Day at the Helsinki Fair Centre.
