= Nummi, Uusimaa =

Nummi
- Former municipality
- Nummen kunta Nummis kommun
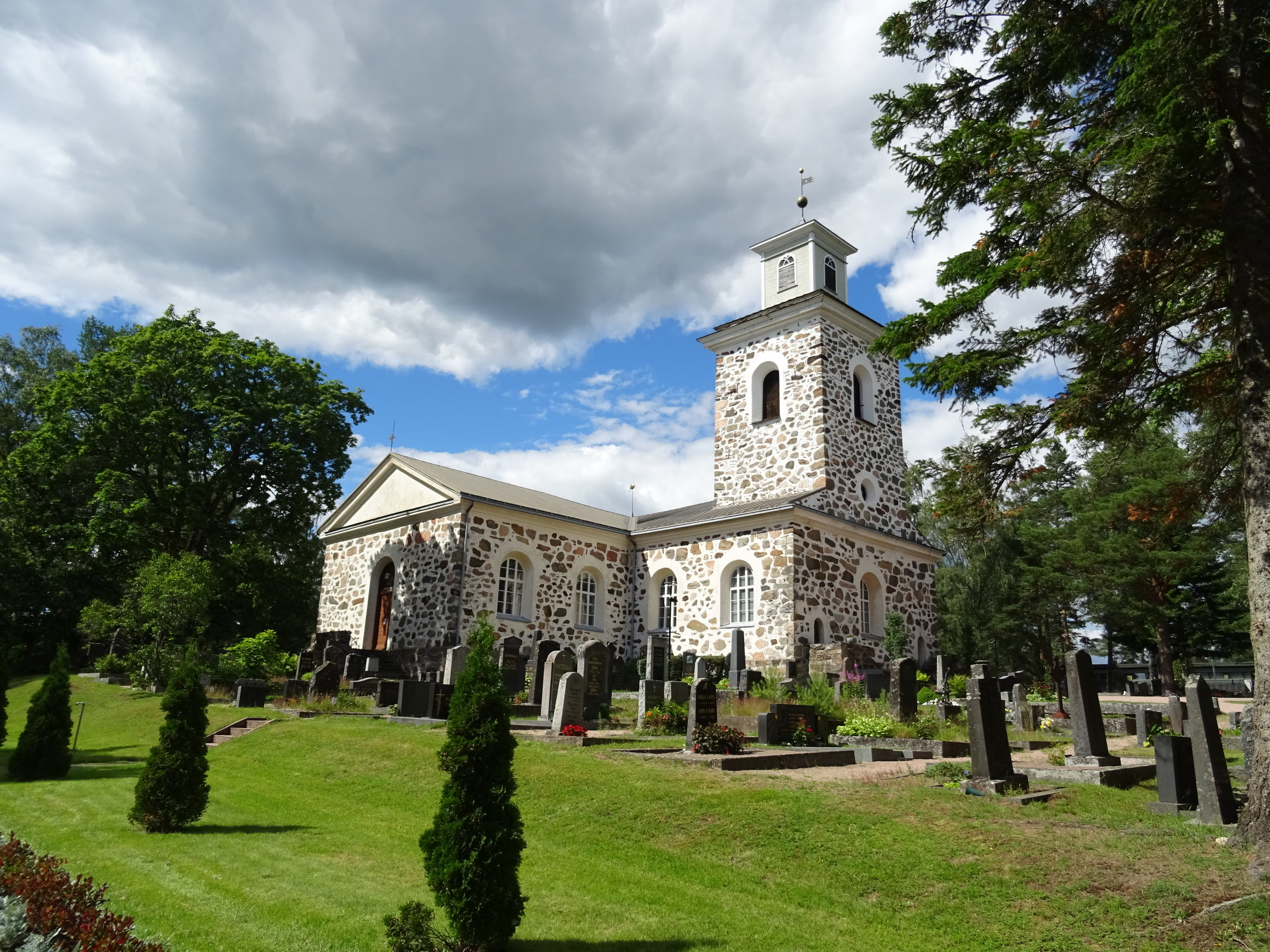
- Nummi Church

- Coat of arms

- Location of Nummi in Finland
- Coordinates: 60°23.5′N 023°53′E
- Country: Finland
- Province: Southern Finland
- Region: Uusimaa
- Sub-region: Helsinki sub-region
- Charter: 1981
- Seat: Nummi church village

Area
  - Land: 196.4 km^{2} (75.8 sq mi)
  - Water: 36.8 km^{2} (14.2 sq mi)

Population (31 December 2012)
  - Total: 2,915
- Climate: Dfb

Nummi (Swedish: Nummis) is a former municipality in the Uusimaa region of Finland. In 1981, Nummi merged with Pusula to form the municipality of Nummi-Pusula. In 2013, Nummi-Pusula in turn merged with the city of Lohja, and nowadays the Nummi village centre is the 103rd district of Lohja. Before the 1981 merger, the neighbouring municipalities of Nummi were Kiikala, Lohja, Pusula, Sammatti, Somero (until 1977, Somerniemi), Suomusjärvi and Vihti.

== History ==
In the 17th century, Nummi was part of the Lohja parish and had its own churchyard. In 1822, a new stone church was built in the neoclassical style by the shore of Lake Pitkäjärvi. In 1843, Nummi separated from Lohja to become an independent municipality.

The Finnish Heritage Agency has recorded over a hundred relics found in the Nummi and Pusula area. Most of these items are from the Stone Age. The Nummi village centre and church area together are a nationally valuable built environment protected by law.

== Notable people ==
Name	Occupation	Relation to Nummi
Pentti Hiidenheimo	MP	Former farmer in Nummi
Johannes Korhonen	CEO	Former entrepreneur in Nummi
Juhani Leppälä	MP and Minister	Born in Nummi
Kaarle Ojanen	MP	Former farmer in Nummi
Ruben Stiller	Journalist and compere	Born in Nummi
Esa Saario	Actor	Born in Nummi

== Localities ==
The main population centres of Nummi are Nummi village centre (around the church) and Saukkola.

The hamlets of Nummi are: Haarla, Hakula, Heijala, Heimola, Huhti, Hyrsylä, Hyvelä, Immola, Jakova, Järvenpää, Jättölä, Korkianoja, Kovela, Leppäkorpi, Luttula, Maikkala, Maskila, Mettula, Miemola, Millola, Mommola, Mäntsälä, Nummi, Näkkilä, Oinola, Oittila, Pakkala, Pälölä, Raatti, Remala, Rettlahti, Röhkölä, Salo, Saukkola, Sierla, Sitarla, Tavola, Varttila and Vivola.

== Nature ==
The largest water systems in Nummi are lake Pitkäjärvi, which is connected to Nummi river, and Lake Valkerpyy which is connected to Lake Lohja.

The cultivated Nummi river valley is a nationally valuable and protected area.
