= Museum card (Finland) =

Personal 12-month pass to 300 museums in Finland

The Finnish museum card (Finnish: museokortti) is the shared museum entrance ticket of the Finnish Museums Association. As of June 2021 the card grants access to 327 museums throughout Finland (including the autonomous region of Åland).

The museum card was launched in 2015 and during its first three months 16,000 cards were purchased. At the beginning the card cost €54 for a year and granted access to over 200 museums.

The museum card has reportedly grown in popularity despite the COVID-19 pandemic in 2020 when 200,000 cards were purchased and 70 per cent of the card holders renewed their expired card. In total the card brought in 10,1 million euro for the Finnish museums. In 2023 the cost of the card is 76 euro for a year and it can also be installed as an application to a smartphone.

In 2019 the most visited museums among the card holders were:

Museum	Location
Ateneum Art Museum	Helsinki
Amos Rex	Helsinki
Museum of Contemporary Art Kiasma	Helsinki
Helsinki Art Museum	Helsinki
Kunsthalle Helsinki	Helsinki
National Museum of Finland	Helsinki
WeeGee	Espoo
Design Museum	Helsinki
Sinebrychoff Art Museum	Helsinki
Vapriikki	Tampere
