= Finnish regional road 280 =

Road in Finland

Regional Road 280
- Yhdystie 280 (Finnish); Förbindelseväg 280 (Swedish)
- Somero Road: Somerontie; Somerosvägen
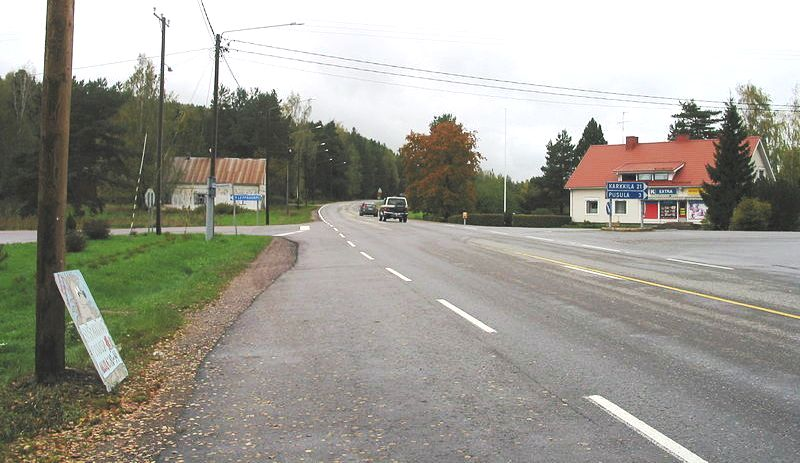

Route information
- Length: 42 km (26 mi)

Major junctions
- From: Somero
- To: Näkkilä, Lohja

Location
- Country: Finland

Highway system
- Highways in Finland

Finnish regional road 280 (Finnish: Seututie 280, Swedish: Regionalväg 280), or Somero Road (Finnish: Somerontie, Swedish: Somerosvägen), is the road between highway 52 and road 110. At the southern end it starts near the village of Näkkilä in Lohja, Uusimaa and at the northern end from the town centre of Somero, Southwest Finland.

The road has traditionally formed the most important road connection between Somero and Helsinki. However, after Highway 1 was completed as a motorway, it has been found that the connection road 2410 leading from Highway 1 to Somero via Kiikala offers an almost equally fast route from Somero to Helsinki; although the journey is longer, the longer section of motorway is said to increase safety. Before the current Highway 2 was completed in the 1960s, the section of current regional road 280 from the intersection of current regional road 125 in Nummi-Pusula to current road 52 in Somero was part of Highway 2.

The initial part of the road is dominated by cultivated valleys with villages, into which the edge formations of the second and third Salpausselkä with their longitudinal ridges intertwine in Pusula and Somerniemi, and the ridges also continue in Somero. There are no fewer than three manors along the road in Somero. Also, in the village of Hirsjärvi, about 9 kilometres (5.6 mi) from the town centre of Somero and about 5 kilometres (3.1 mi) from Somerniemi, there is a kiosk along the regional road that is served as a memorial to singer Rauli "Badding" Somerjoki (1947–1987) since 1997.

== Route ==
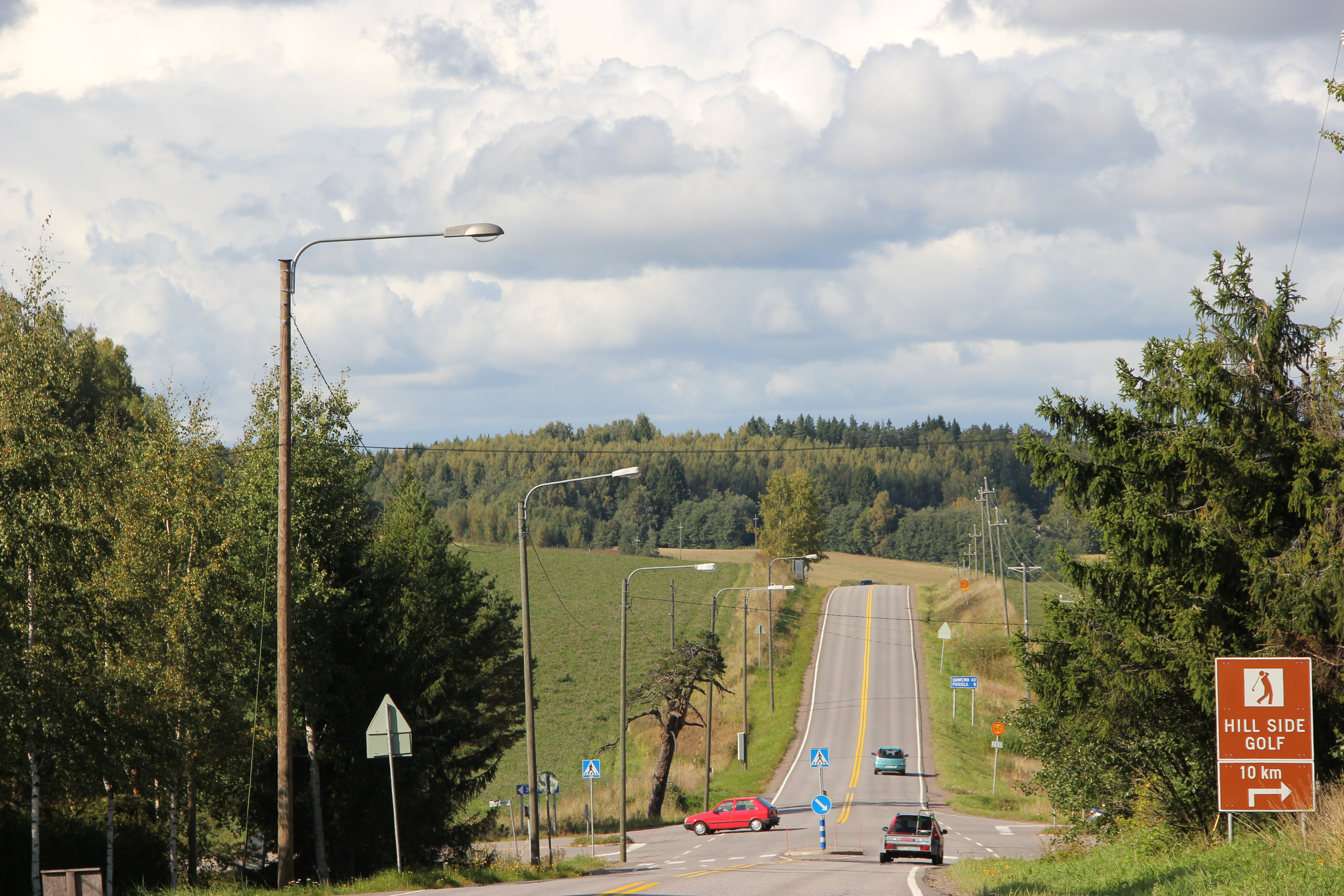
Road 280 in Koisjärvi towards Pusula and Somero

- Lohja
  - Näkkilä
  - Koisjärvi
  - Hyönölä
- Somero
  - Somerniemi
  - Hirsjärvi
  - Somero

== See also ==
- Turuntie
