= Sammatti =

- Former municipality
- Sammatin kunta Sammatti kommun
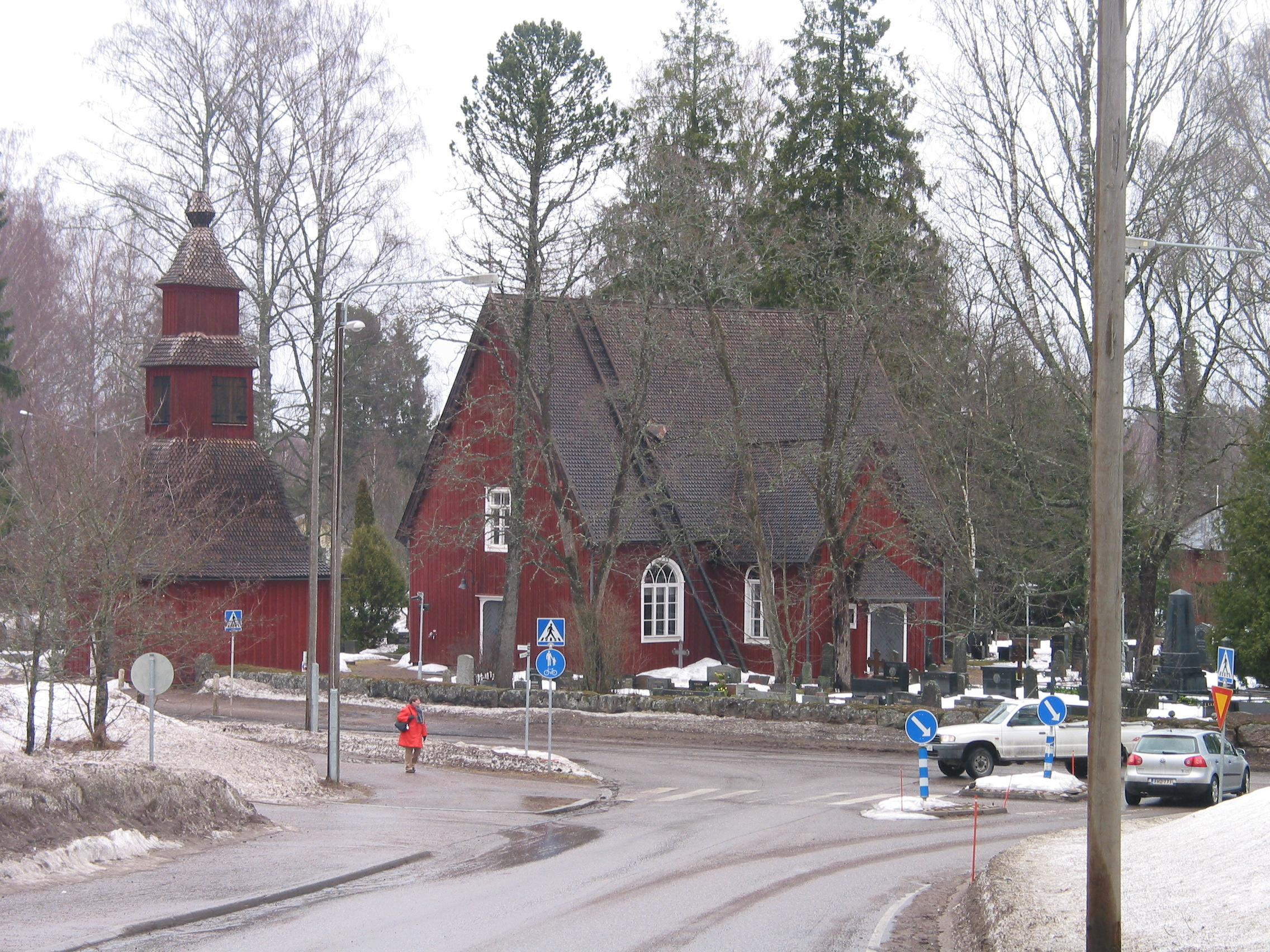
- Sammatti Church

- Coat of arms

- Location of Sammatti in Finland
- Coordinates: 60°19′15″N 023°49′15″E
- Country: Finland
- Region: Uusimaa
- Sub-region: Helsinki sub-region (formerly Lohja sub-region)
- Consolidated with Lohja: 2009

Area
  - Total: 85.06 km^{2} (32.84 sq mi)
  - Land: 72.01 km^{2} (27.80 sq mi)
  - Water: 13.05 km^{2} (5.04 sq mi)

Population (2008-12-31)
  - Total: 1,365
  - Density: 18.96/km^{2} (49.10/sq mi)

Population by age
  - 0 to 14: 18.8%
  - 15 to 64: 65.1%
  - 65 or older: 16.0%
- Time zone: UTC+2 (EET)
  - Summer (DST): UTC+3 (EEST)
- Climate: Dfb

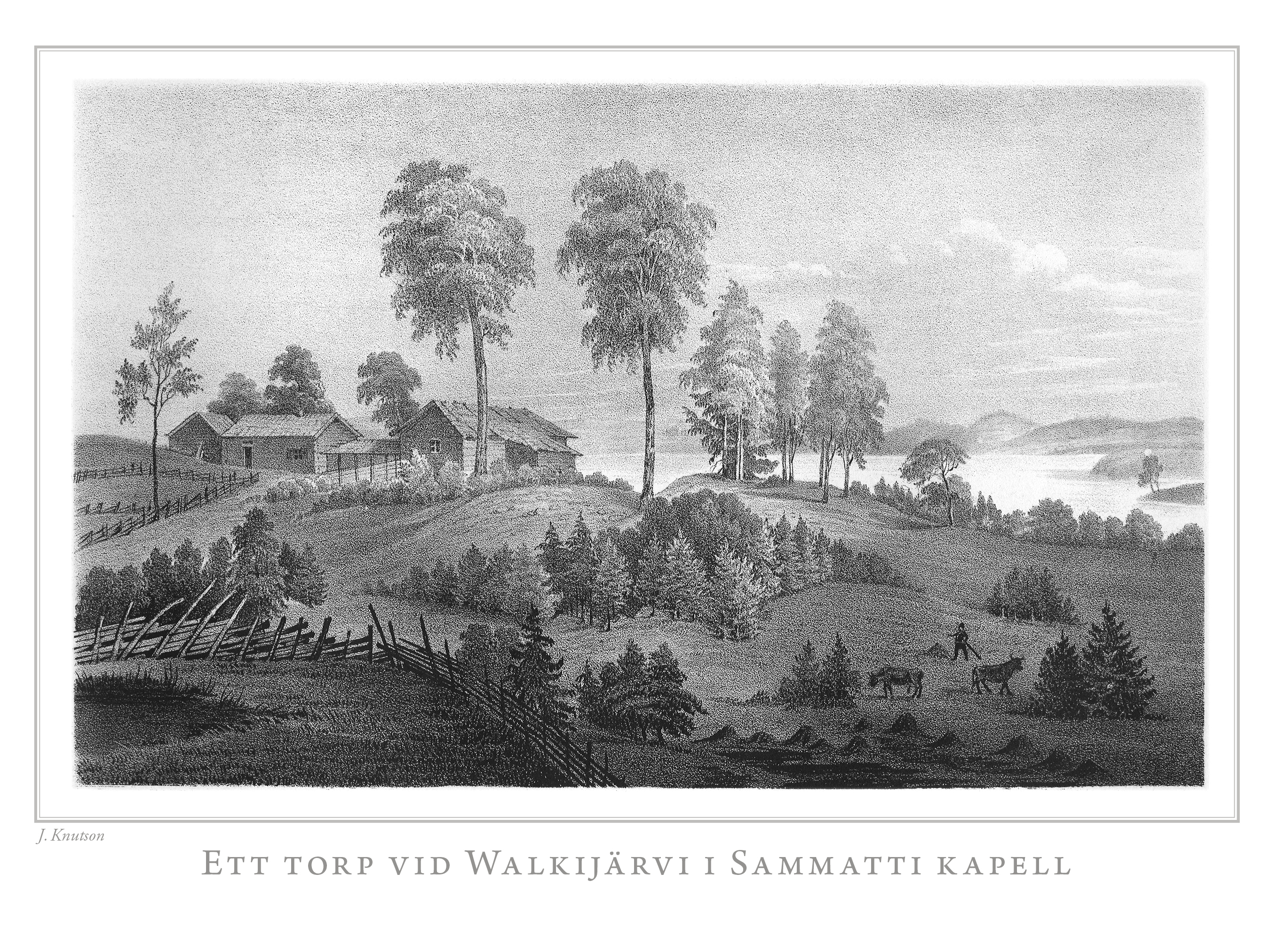
An illustration of Sammatti in Finland framställdt i teckningar (1845-1852)

Sammatti (Finnish pronunciation: [ˈsɑmːɑtːi]) is a former municipality of Finland. It was consolidated with the city of Lohja in the beginning of 2009.

It is located in the province of Southern Finland and is part of the Uusimaa region. The municipality had a population of 1,365 (31 December 2008) and covered a land area of 72.01 square kilometres (27.80 sq mi). The population density was 18.96 inhabitants per square kilometre (49.1/sq mi).

The municipality is unilingually Finnish.

It was the birthplace of one of Finland's most famous writers, Elias Lönnrot, the compiler of the Kalevala.

== Villages ==
Prior to its consolidation into Lohja in 2009, Sammatti contained the following villages:

- Haarijärvi (Haarjärvi)
- Karstu
- Kaukola
- Kiikala
- Leikkilä

- Lohilampi
- Luskala
- Myllykylä
- Niemenkylä
- Sammatti

== See also ==
- Karjalohja
- Nummi-Pusula
