= Reino Sylvander =

Finnish diplomat

Reino Vilho (Wilhelm) Silvanto (until 1929 Sylvander; 21 February 1883 – 29 January 1943) was a Finnish diplomat and author from Helsinki. He used pen names such as R.W.S, Reino Silva, and Reino Silvala as he was a translator.

Silvano's parents were carpenter Karl Kristoffer Sylvander and Elviira Kallentytär. He graduated from Helsinki in 1903 and graduated from the University of Helsinki to Bachelor of Philosophy in 1908 and master's degree in 1910.

Silvanto was initially a teacher at various educational establishments in Helsinki, Forssa and Kotka. He was employed by the Finnish News Agency in 1918 and then served as a Head of the Department of the Sarkanen & Helmee's law firm from 1918 to 1920.

Silvanto served as Finland's representative in Latvia since 1920 and Envoy of Finland to Latvia in 1926–1927. Silvanto left for Foreign Affairs in 1929 and later worked as a writer and translator in Helsinki.

Silvanto translated Polish, Czech and Russian literature to Finnish (Anton Chekhov, Nikolai Gogol, Maksim Gorky, Henryk Sienkiewicz, Władysław Reymont, Karel Čapek). He also wrote Sammatti's history and published two Polish prose presenting anthologies: Young Poland (1916) and White Eagle (1937).

Silvanto married Olga Saastamoinen in 1912.

== See also ==
- List of ambassadors of Finland
