= Aarikka =

Finnish design company

Aarikka Oy
- Company type: Osakeyhtiö
- Founded: 1954; 71 years ago in Helsinki, Finland
- Founder: Kaija Aarikka, Erkki Ruokonen
- Fate: Acquired by Martinex Oy (2017)
- Headquarters: Turku, Finland
- Key people: Riia Sandström (CEO)
- Products: Household items, giftware, personal accessories
- Revenue: c. EUR 2m
- Owner: Martinex Oy
- Website: www.aarikka.com

Aarikka is a Finnish company designing and manufacturing home furnishings, decorative items, and personal accessories. It is regarded as an internationally notable Finnish design brand.

Founded in 1954 by designers Kaija Aarikka and her husband Erkki Ruokonen, the company started out manufacturing wooden buttons, before expanding into other product categories; wood remains a 'signature' characteristic of Aarikka products.

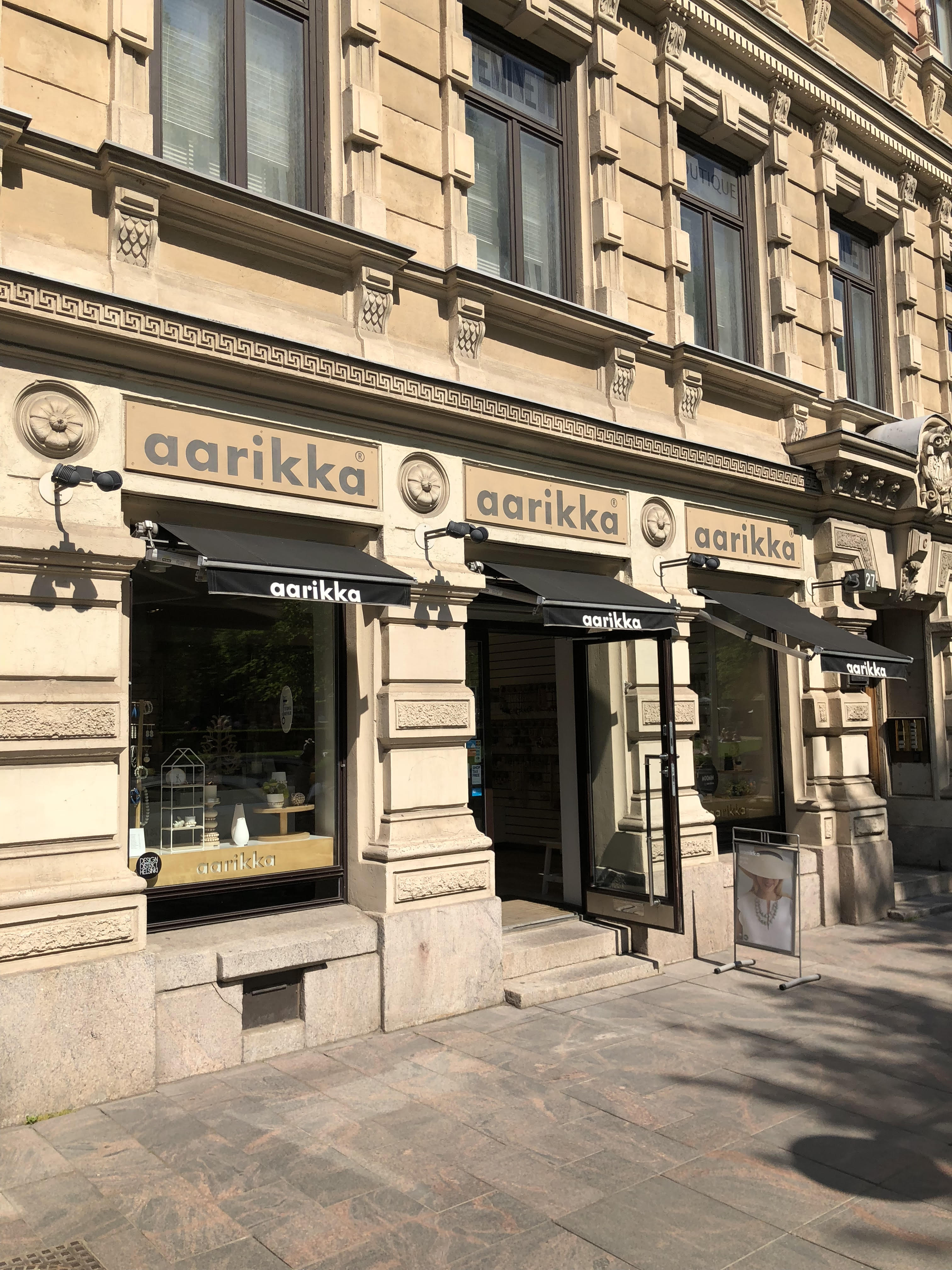
Aarikka store on Esplanadi in Helsinki

Aarikka opened its first retail store in Helsinki in 1960, expanding to 20 outlets by the 1980s.

In 2017, Aarikka was acquired by another Finnish household and gift items manufacturer, Martinex Oy. Until then, the company was owned by the Aarikka family, and one of the founders' daughters, Pauliina Aarikka, remains in the business as a designer.
