= Somero =

- Town
- Someron kaupunki Somero stad
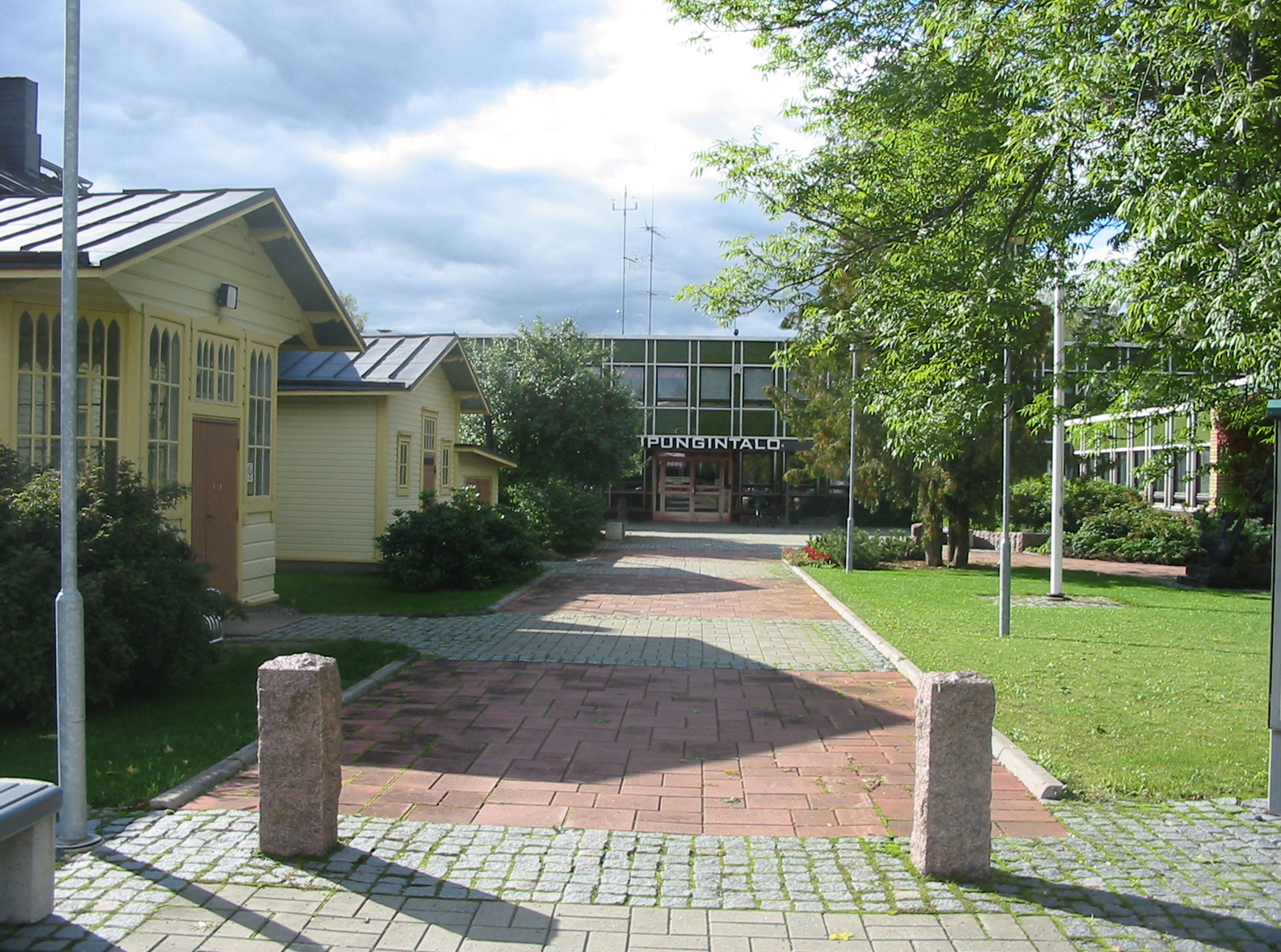
- Somero town hall

- Coat of arms

- Location of Somero in Finland
- Interactive map of Somero
- Coordinates: 60°38′N 023°31′E
- Country: Finland
- Region: Southwest Finland
- Sub-region: Salo sub-region
- Charter: 1867
- Town privileges: 1993

Government
  - Town manager: Sami Suikkanen

Area (2018-01-01)
  - Total: 697.67 km^{2} (269.37 sq mi)
  - Land: 668.05 km^{2} (257.94 sq mi)
  - Water: 29.9 km^{2} (11.5 sq mi)
  - Rank: 127th largest in Finland

Population (2025-12-31)
  - Total: 8,339
  - Rank: 116th largest in Finland
  - Density: 12.48/km^{2} (32.3/sq mi)

Population by native language
  - Finnish: 92.5% (official)
  - Swedish: 0.5%
  - Others: 6.9%

Population by age
  - 0 to 14: 13.2%
  - 15 to 64: 54.1%
  - 65 or older: 32.7%
- Time zone: UTC+02:00 (EET)
  - Summer (DST): UTC+03:00 (EEST)
- Climate: Dfc
- Website: www.somero.fi/in-english/

Somero (Finnish pronunciation: [ˈsomero]) is a town and municipality of Finland. It is part of the Southwest Finland region in the province of Western Finland, located 36 kilometres (22 mi) northeast of Salo, 86 kilometres (53 mi) east of Turku and 105 kilometres (65 mi) northwest of Helsinki. The municipality has a population of 8,339 (31 December 2025) and covers an area of 697.67 square kilometres (269.37 sq mi) of which 29.9 km^{2} (11.5 sq mi) is water. The population density is 12.48 inhabitants per square kilometre (32.3/sq mi). Somero is unilingually Finnish.

Somero's neighbouring municipalities are Jokioinen, Koski Tl, Lohja, Loimaa, Salo, Tammela and Ypäjä.

== History ==
Somero has been known as a trading place since the 14th century. The municipality was officially founded in 1867. The municipality of Somerniemi merged with Somero proper in 1977. Somero was moved from the province of Häme to the province of Turku and Pori in 1990. Currently it belongs to the province of Western Finland. Somero became a town (kaupunki) on January 1, 1993.

== Scenery ==
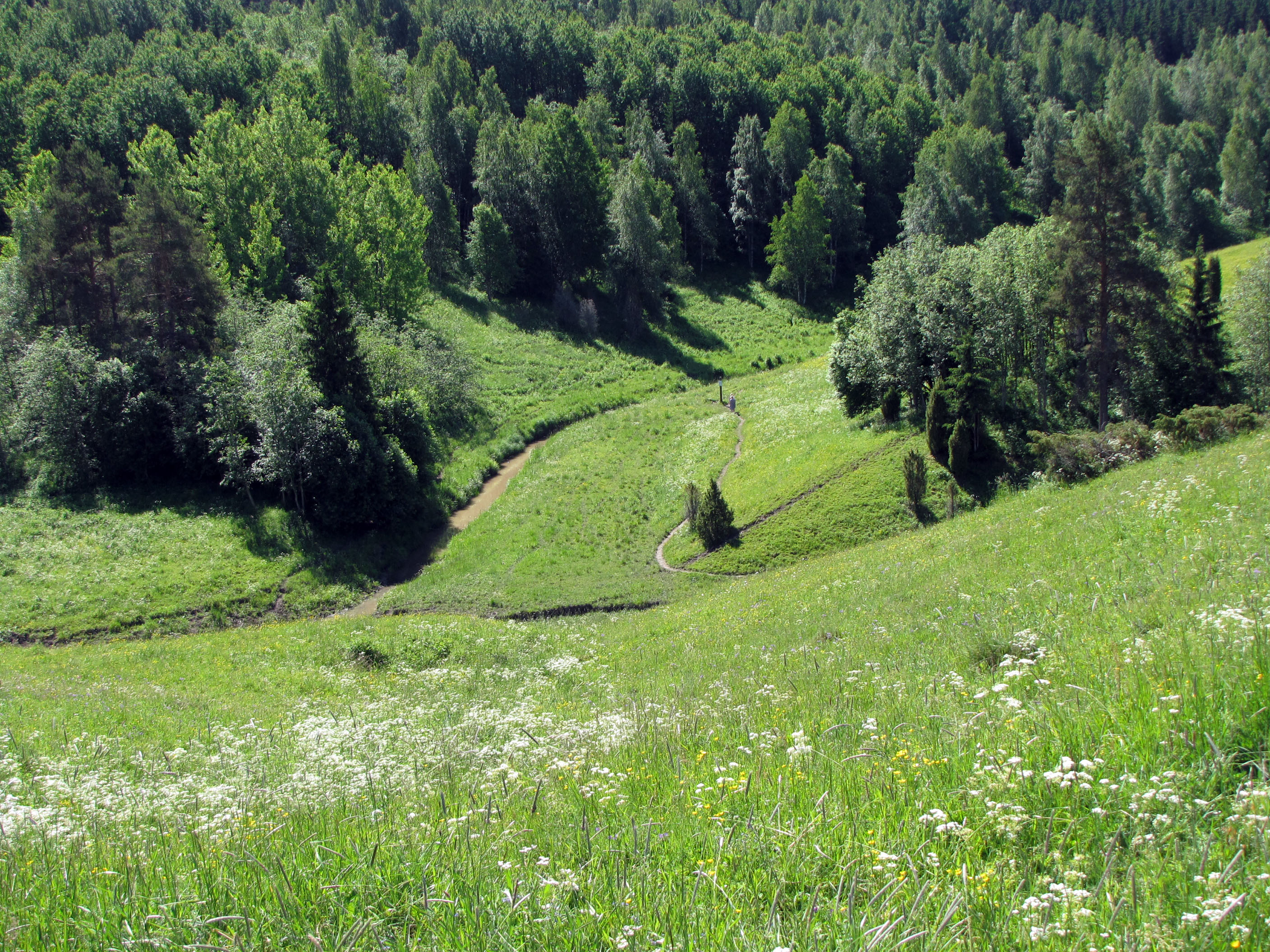
Hantala ravine with the Rekijoki River in Somero

Häntälä Hollows are the traditional biotope area in the villages of Häntälä, Talvisilla, Syväoja and Kerkola. The nature trail that begins at the Häntälä Village House is located in the area, where it is possible to explore its traditional landscapes. Häntälä Hollows is part of the wider Natura 2000 area of the Rekijokilaakso, which also extends to the city of Salo. The most significant main roads in Somero are the national road 52 through the town center and the regional road 280 in south of the town center, which is the most direct road connection to Helsinki.

== Notable people ==
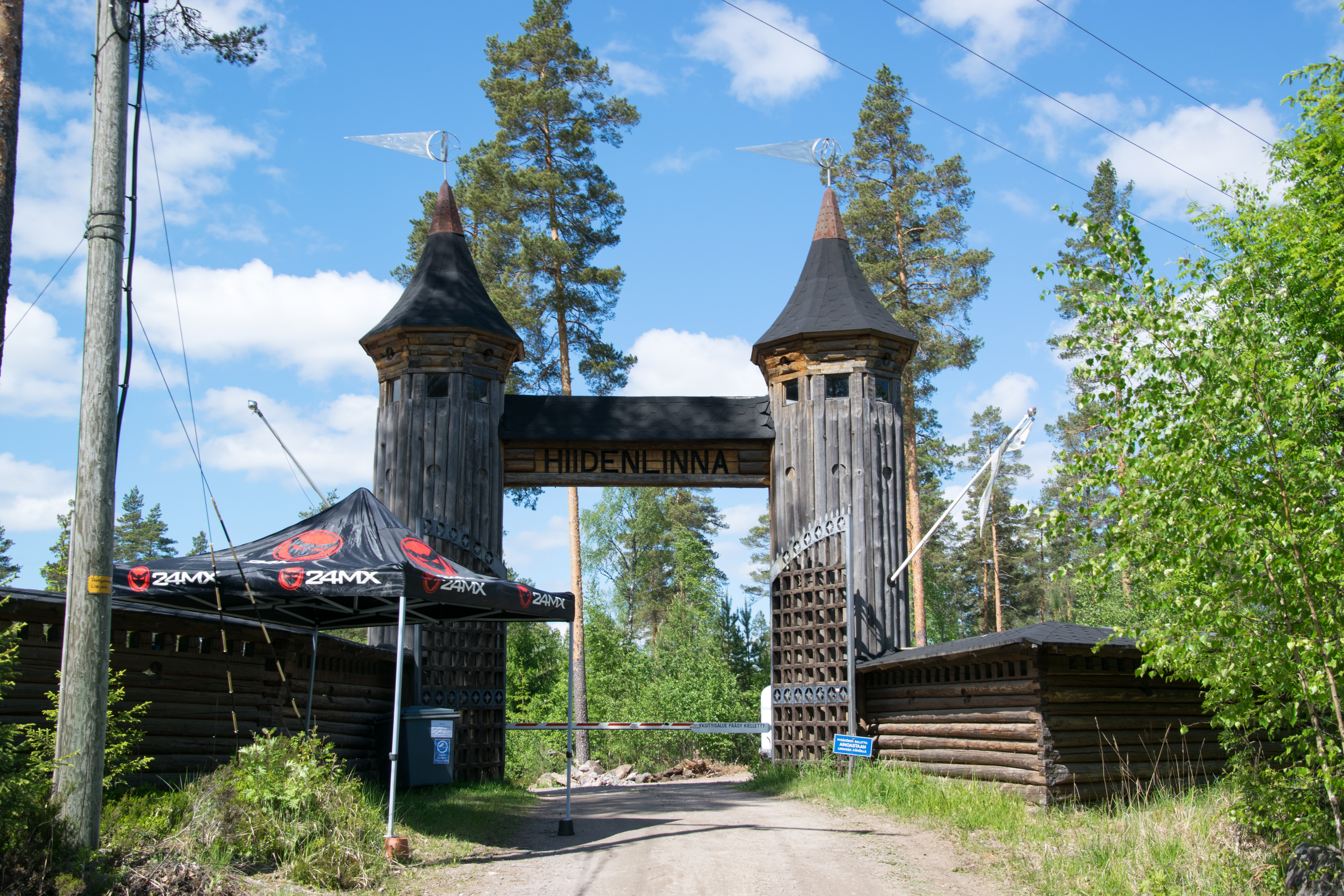
Hiidenlinna, a tourist attraction designed by a local artist Reino Koivuniemi.

- Kaija Aarikka
- Karita Mattila
- Unto Mononen
- Pentti Nikula
- M.A. Numminen
- Rauli "Badding" Somerjoki
- Kaari Utrio
- Mauno Wilkkinen

== International relations ==
=== Twin towns ===
Somero has six twin cities

- Narva, Estonia
- (Denmark) Otterup
- (Norway) Tune
- (Norway) Vindafjord
- (Sweden) Älvkarleby
- (Russia) Protvino
