= Koisjärvi =

- Village
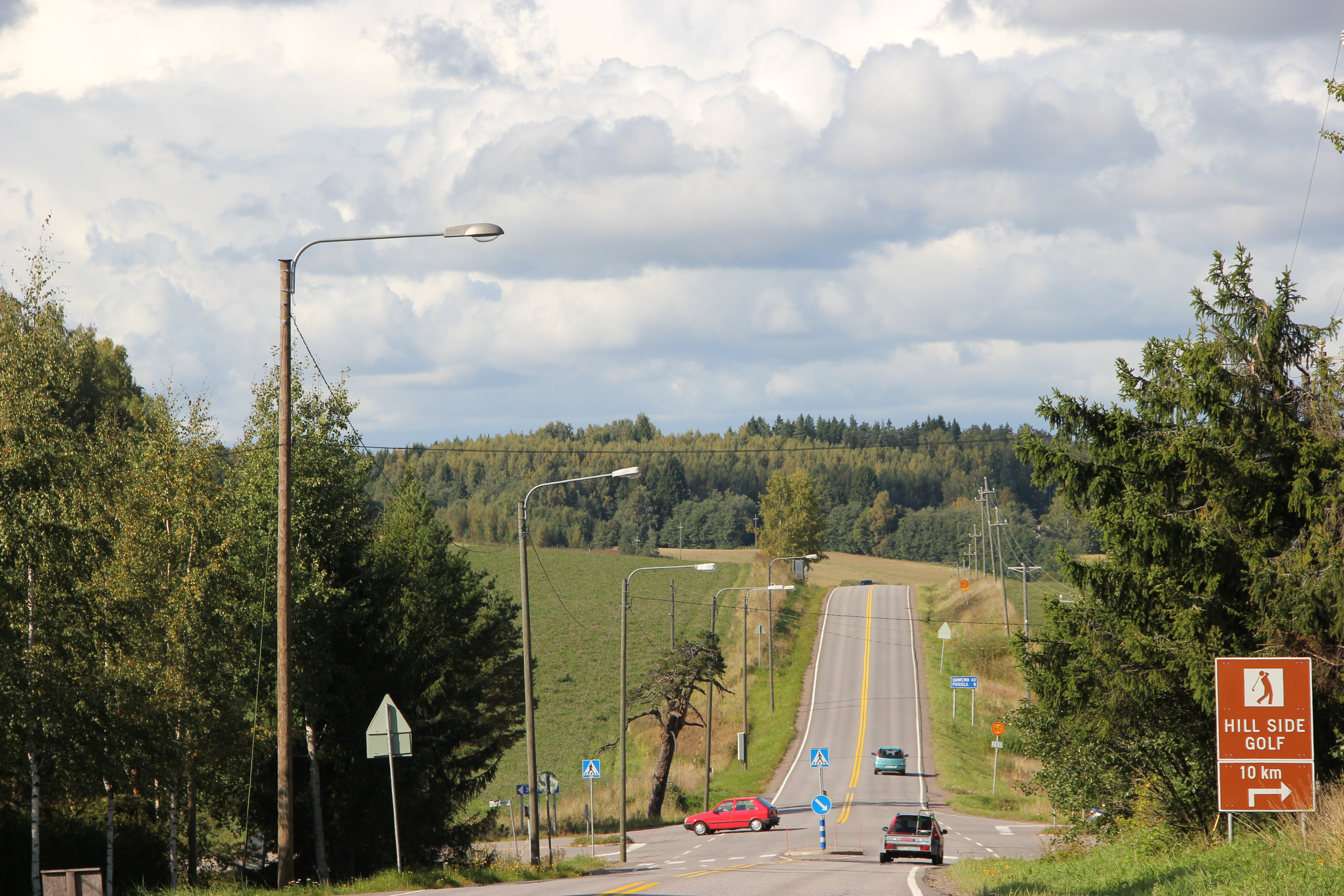
- Koisjärvi along the road 280.

- Location in Finland
- Coordinates: 60°24′02.14″N 24°03′55.94″E
- Country: Finland
- Region: Uusimaa
- Municipality: Lohja
- Subdivision: Nummi-Pusula

Population (31 December 2015)
  - Total: 499
- Time zone: UTC+2 (EET)
  - Summer (DST): UTC+3 (EEST)
- Postal code: 09630

Koisjärvi (Finnish pronunciation: [koi̯sˌjærʋi]) is a village in the former Nummi-Pusula municipality, now part of the city of Lohja in Uusimaa, Finland. In 2015, it has less than 500 inhabitants. The village is located near the lake of the same name.

Koisjärvi's attractions include a pine tree, which is said to be depicted on the 50, 20 and 10 Finnish markka and penni coins. Another landmark of the village is the wall inscription "Koisjärven disko" ("Koisjärvi's disco") at the same intersection, clearly visible from the road, in an old building (a former shop) painted with red clay.

The village was once home to a village school, founded in 1903, which was closed in 2014.

== See also ==
- Finnish regional road 280
- Pusula (village)
