= Mauno Wilkkinen =

Finnish world traveler (1910–1995)

- Born: 15 August 1910; Vampula, Finland
- Died: 11 April 1995 (aged 84); Somero, Finland
- Occupation: World traveler
- Known for: Cycling around the world (1972–1981)

Mauno Wilkkinen (official name Mauno Samuli Vilkkinen; 15 August 1910 Vampula – 11 April 1995 Somero) was a Finnish world traveler known especially for his long bicycle journeys in various parts of the world. He was nicknamed Someron teräsvaari (English: Old man of steel from Somero), a title that was also printed on his own business card. Between 1972 and 1981, Wilkkinen cycled around the world, visiting 71 countries during his travels. He repeatedly described his travels with the phrase "I am cycling Finland onto the world map" and called himself "Finland's roving ambassador".

== Life ==
Wilkkinen was originally from Vampula and moved to Somero in the early 1960s, where he lived on Urheilutie street. His official surname was Vilkkinen, but according to his family he used a "W" at the beginning of his surname as an affectation; his name also appears as Mauno Samuli Wilkkinen in the death notice.

Before his travel career, Wilkkinen worked in several different professions, including agriculture, the insurance industry, car sales, real estate brokerage, and as an agent. He participated in the Winter and Continuation Wars and later received a war veteran's pension. Wilkkinen was married, but the marriage ended in divorce; he had three children.

Before his long trips, Wilkkinen studied English using the Linguaphone method and completed a middle school course in Swedish and German.

== Early travels ==
Wilkkinen made his first foreign cycling trip in 1938, cycling approximately 2,300 kilometres in three weeks through Estonia, Latvia, and Lithuania. A long break followed from the war years onwards, and the next foreign trip was made in 1966, when Wilkkinen cycled through West Germany, the Netherlands, and Belgium. In 1967 he again traveled to West Germany, as well as France, Liechtenstein, Switzerland, and Austria.

In 1968, Wilkkinen embarked on an extensive cycling trip to Europe and North Africa. The journey began from Somero on 14 August 1968, lasted 16 months and nine days, and extended to Marrakesh in Morocco. During the trip, he cycled 18,300 kilometres and visited 18 countries. He had 497 marks and 9 pennies as starting funds.

Near Paris, Wilkkinen was involved in a traffic accident while avoiding a car that had made an overtaking error. In the accident, he broke his thumb and a couple of ribs. He recovered for about a week in a tent at a campsite and then continued his journey by walking his bicycle. In Marrakesh, he worked for four days as the bodyguard and guide of a Dutch woman who worked as a doctor in the United States.

In Morocco, Wilkkinen was attacked several times by local stone-throwers in mountainous areas, and part of his travel funds were stolen in Casablanca. According to the magazines Fillari and Iltalehti, it was specifically the experiences of the Africa trip that convinced Wilkkinen that he would be able to cycle around the entire globe.

== Round-the-world trip 1972–1981 ==
Wilkkinen's most famous trip began in January 1972, when he left Rauma for South America aboard a cargo ship. To get on board, Wilkkinen had obtained a seaman's passport from Niilo Wälläri, the chairman of the Finnish Seamen's Union, which allowed him to pay for his trip partly with shipboard work and partly with money. The trip lasted approximately nine and a half years.

During the trip, Wilkkinen visited 71 countries, cycled approximately 86,000 kilometres, and traveled in total approximately 250,000 kilometres by various means of transport. According to Salon Seudun Sanomat, 46,500 kilometres of the total journey were covered by flying. According to Uusi Suomi, 79 bicycle tires were used during the trip, and according to Fillari magazine, seven different bicycles were used in total, some of which had no gears and one of which had five gears.

The travel route went through South America, Central America, and North America to Asia, Australia, and back to Europe. According to Horila, he cycled through all the countries of South America except Venezuela, Guyana, Suriname, and French Guiana. He reached Chile from Argentina only via Peru in 1974, because crossing the Andes directly was not possible by bicycle. In Central America, he passed through six states, and according to the Suomi 1975 column in Turun Sanomat, in June 1975 he had cycled through Costa Rica and was at that time heading toward Mexico. According to Horila, he stayed in Mexico for more than a month. Over the following years, he cycled extensively in the United States and Canada and also visited Alaska, and in 1976 he followed the Montreal Olympics in person.

From America, Wilkkinen continued in 1978 to Hawaii and from there to Japan. The route continued to the Philippines, Thailand, Malaysia, Singapore, Indonesia, Australia, and New Zealand. After this, he continued his journey to India, Egypt, and Israel, where he worked on a kibbutz for several months. He returned to Finland in June 1981.

== Travel style ==
Wilkkinen often traveled with very small amounts of money. He set off on the 1968 trip with funds of 497 marks and 9 pennies, and on the 1972 round-the-world trip with starting funds of about 1,000 marks. According to Horila, he also received a war veteran's pension, and money for a possible return flight was kept in reserve in Finland.

Wilkkinen financed his travels by doing temporary work in different countries. According to sources, he worked in construction, gardening, painting, masonry, and repair work; according to Horila, he participated in construction work in Paraguay, Brazil, Canada, Japan, Singapore, Australia, and Detroit in the United States. According to Seura magazine's travel report, in Torremolinos he did jobs including caretaker, orange farm worker, repairman, and sauna builder.

Wilkkinen stated in several sources that he did not beg or hitchhike during his travels. He often slept in a tent or in accommodations offered by locals, and he avoided paid campsites. According to Salon Seudun Sanomat, he got by on his trip with self-taught English, sign language, and by learning at least numerals and the most common food words in various languages. According to Horila, he claimed to know the numerals in sixteen languages.

Wilkkinen's diet on his trips was extremely sparse. His main food was homemade oatmeal porridge, for which he used oat flakes, sugar, and eggs. He stated that he had adapted his body to an irregular rhythm and ate only when he felt hungry; during periods when he had no money, he fasted.

Wilkkinen carried with him a tent, sleeping bag, cooking utensils, tools, spare parts and spare tires, as well as a camera, diary, and address books. As a personal weapon, he carried a slingshot on the Africa trip, with which he repelled dog attacks, and in South America additionally a long machete. A sign on the back of his bicycle read "Finland" and listed the countries he had cycled through.

== Publicity and archive ==
Wilkkinen's travels attracted attention especially abroad. According to Horila, about 400 articles about him were published in foreign newspapers, including the high-circulation Asahi Shimbun published in Tokyo. According to Fillari magazine, he was interviewed for dozens of radio and television programs in various countries, and Horila writes that he appeared on television about fifty times and spoke many times on Finnish-language radio broadcasts in different countries. In Finland, Wilkkinen was interviewed by journalist Pentti Kasurinen on the Yleisradio program Anna palaa on 17 October 1983. A South American newspaper compared him to Paavo Nurmi in putting Finland on the map, and the comparison was repeated in other publications as the trip progressed.

Wilkkinen compiled an extensive archive from his travels. According to Horila, it included about 6,000 photographs, an extensive collection of newspaper clippings, and guestbooks that had accumulated about 5,200 names and addresses. Correspondence from 1972–1984 filled seven folders, and the number of both received and sent letters was approaching two thousand each. According to Se! magazine, his archive contained over 6,000 photographs and at least the same number of letters. On his trips, Wilkkinen also visited Finns living abroad; according to Horila, he met about twenty Finnish ambassadors and visited 41 consulates.

Journalist Antti Arve has noted that although Wilkkinen was widely written about in foreign newspapers and interviewed for numerous radio and television programs in various countries, his trip received significantly less attention in Finland than, for example, the crew of the Finnish boat in the 1981 Whitbread Round the World Race in the same year.

Wilkkinen's life's work has been recorded and studied especially by Arve, who first met Wilkkinen in the summer of 1981 after his return from the round-the-world trip and interviewed him for several hours for Turun Sanomat. On his own bicycle trips in South America, North America, and Asia, Arve met numerous people who had encountered Wilkkinen, and wrote extensive obituaries about Wilkkinen for Iltalehti and Fillari magazine in 1997. Alongside Arve's writing, Fillari magazine proposed that Wilkkinen's travel estate should be properly placed in a museum as significant historical material.

== Later years and death ==
After the round-the-world trip, Wilkkinen continued bicycle traveling. As late as 1990, when he turned 80, he returned to Somero from a seven-month trip during which he had visited Florida and Canada.

Wilkkinen died on 11 April 1995 in Somero. He was blessed at Vampula Church on 22 April 1995. According to Fillari and Iltalehti magazines, he died of cancer.
