= Somerniemi =

Coordinates: 60°34′N 023°43′E

- Municipality
- Coat of arms

- Province: Häme
- Established: 1868

Population (1976)
  - Total: 1,409

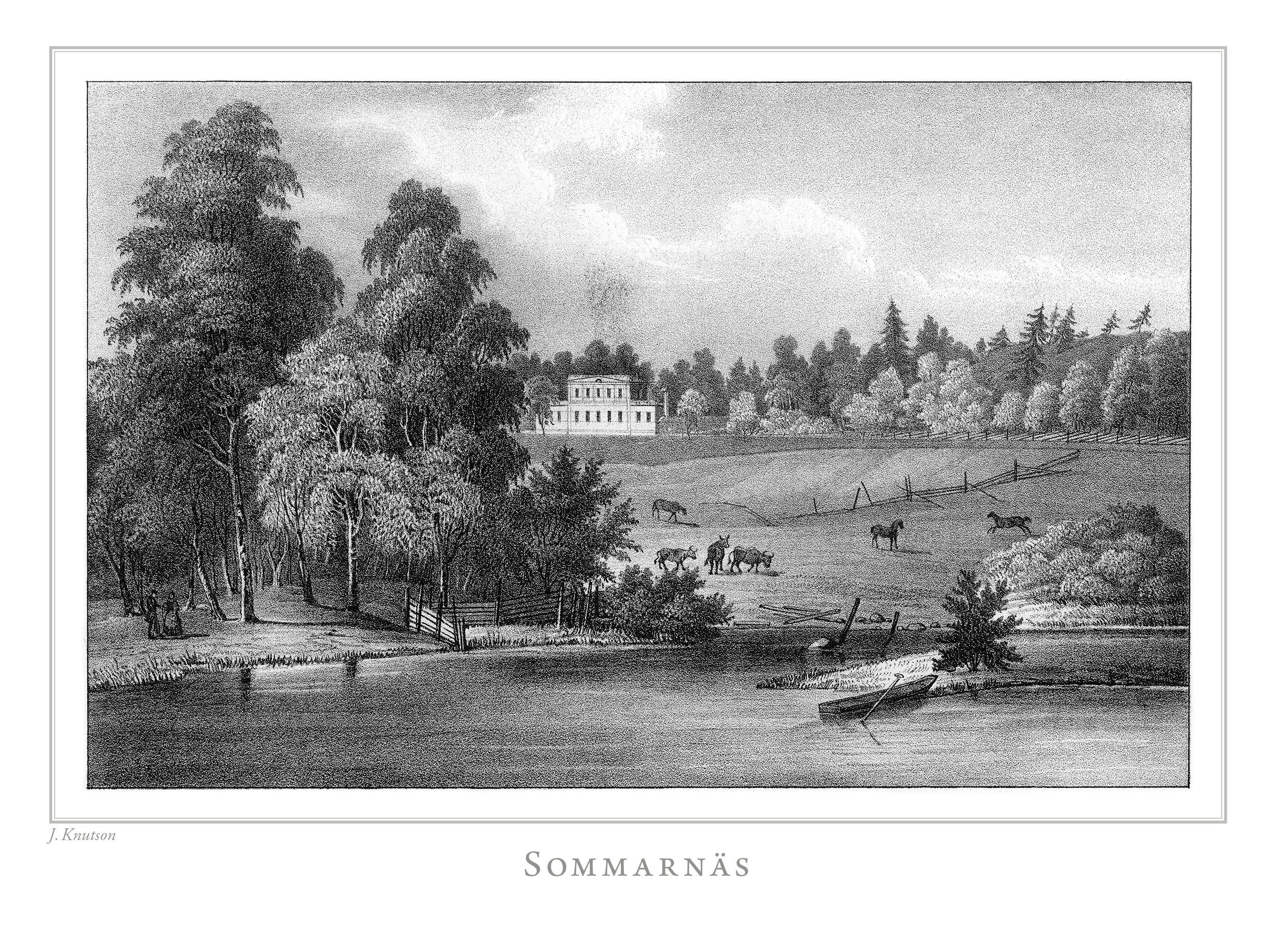
Illustration in Finland framstäldt i teckningar edited by Zacharias Topelius and published 1845–1852.

Somerniemi is a former municipality of Finland. It was incorporated to Somero in 1977, at the time in Häme Province, which then became part of the new Western Finland Province. Somerniemi was originally a chapel congregation within the larger municipality of Somero. According to historical tradition, the first chapel in Somerniemi was built in 1682, and the congregation received its first priest in 1695.

== See also ==
- Finnish regional road 280 – a route running through the locality
- Hiidenlinna – a local tourist attraction
