= Kaija Aarikka =

Finnish designer and entrepreneur (1929–2014)

Kauppaneuvos Kaija Aarikka
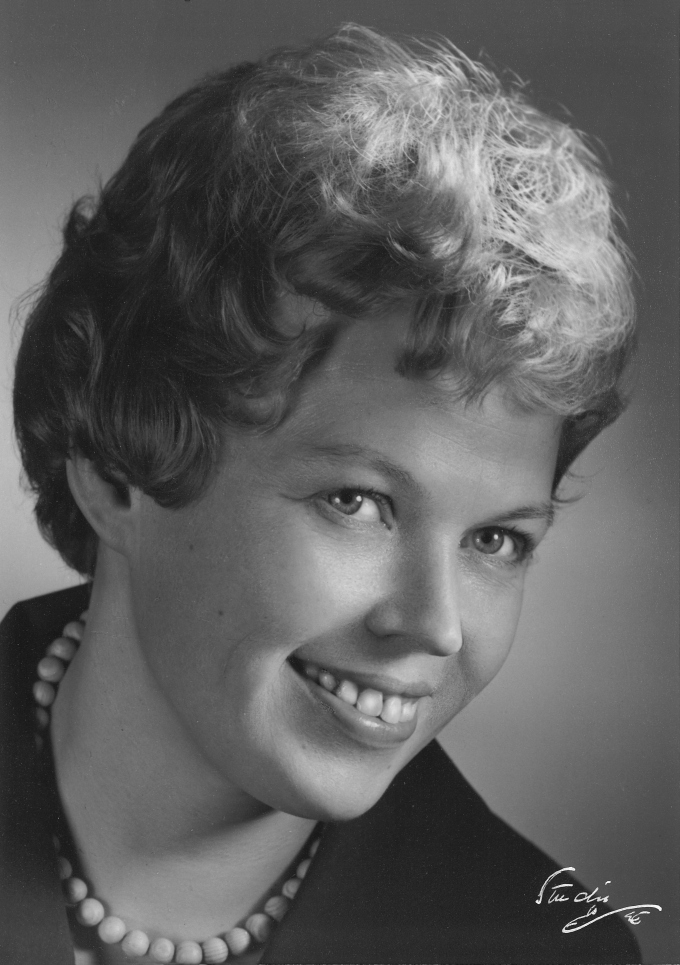
- Kaija-Aarikka in 1949
- Born: 3 February 1929; Somero, Finland
- Died: 14 August 2014 (aged 85); Helsinki, Finland
- Education: Taideteollinen Oppilaitos
- Known for: Wood objects
- Spouse: Erkki Ruokonen (m. 1954, died)
- Awards: Pro Finlandia (1994)

Kaija Helena Aarikka-Ruokonen (3 February 1929 – 14 August 2014) was a Finnish designer and entrepreneur.

== Early life and education ==
Kaija Aarikka was born in Somero to a farming family; her parents were Väinö Aarikka and Alma Maria née Kares.

She completed lower secondary school (Note: Keskikoulu, in the Finnish school system before the 1970s restructuring.) in 1945, and later studied textile arts and design at the Taideteollinen Oppilaitos school of design (now part of Aalto University School of Arts, Design and Architecture), graduating in 1954.

== Career ==
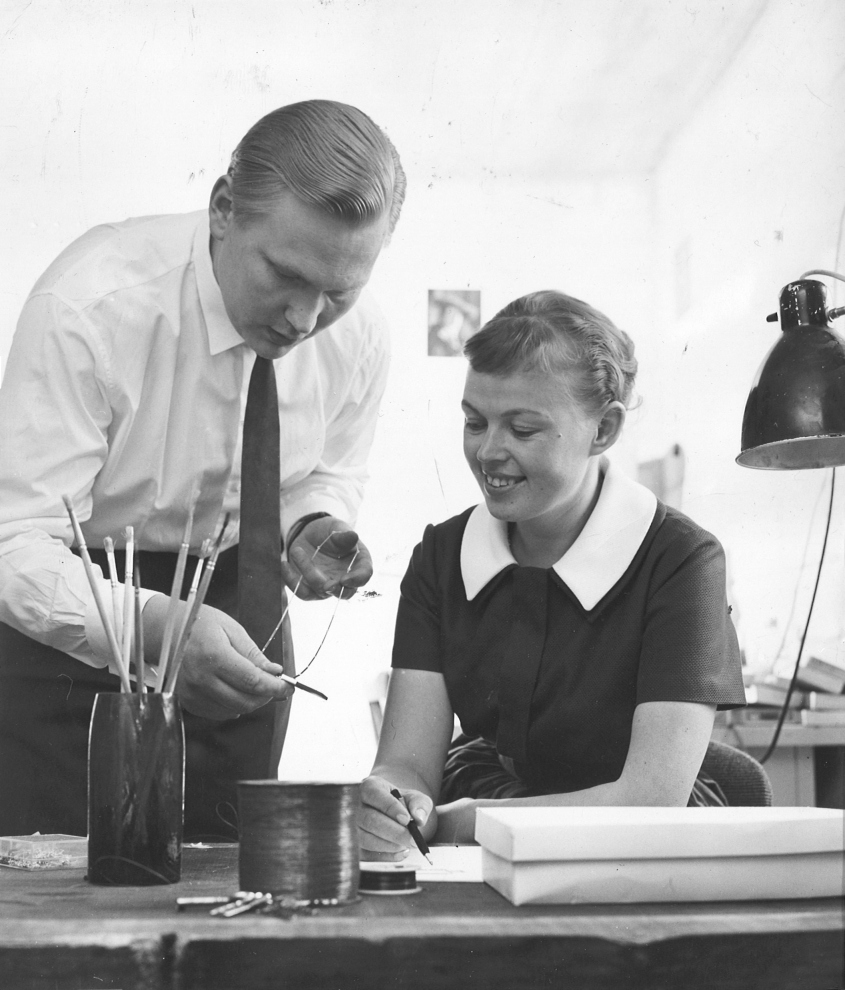
Aarikka with her husband and business partner Erkki Ruokonen (c. 1950s)

In 1954, Aarikka and her husband co-founded the eponymous design bureau Aarikka, initially to design and manufacture wooden buttons and decorative and household items, later expanding into personal accessories, dress jewellery and giftware. She worked there as the firm's head designer and artistic director for most of her career, also taking on management duties including chairing the Board of Directors from 1977.

The first Aarikka store opened in 1960, and by the 1980s there were 20.

Aarikka is best known for her simplistic wooden designs, often in characteristic round shapes. One of her most iconic creations is the wooden Pässi ('Ram') sculpture.

From the early 1970s onwards, she also provided freelance design services for Humppila and Ahlstrom glassworks (both now part of Iittala) as well as for Tampella textiles. One of Aarikka's glass designs for Humppila is in the British Museum collections.

== Awards and honours ==
In 1994, Aarikka received the Pro Finlandia medal of the Order of the Lion of Finland.

In 1999, to mark her 70th birthday, the honorary title of Kauppaneuvos was bestowed on Aarikka.

== Personal life ==
In 1954, Aarikka married businessman Erkki Ruokonen; the couple had three daughters.

Her favourite pastimes included theatre, literature, and outdoor pursuits.

She died, aged 85, following a long illness.
