= Elias Lönnrot =

Finnish polymath and poet (1802–1884)

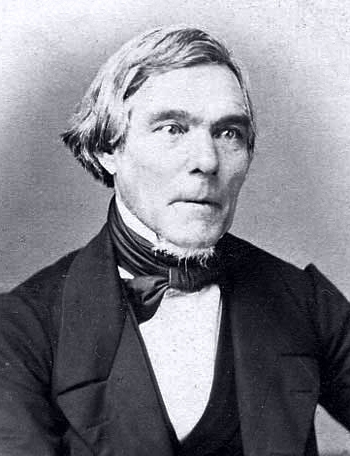
- Born: 9 April 1802; Sammatti, Nyland and Tavastehus County, Sweden
- Died: 19 March 1884 (aged 81); Sammatti, Grand Duchy of Finland, Russian Empire
- Occupations: Physician; philologist; poetry collector
- Known for: Kalevala, Flora Fennica

Elias Lönnrot (Finnish: [ˈeliɑs ˈlønruːt]; 9 April 1802 – 19 March 1884) was a Finnish medical doctor, philosopher, poet, musician, linguist, journalist, philologist and collector of traditional Finnish oral poetry. He is best known for synthesizing the Finnish national epic, Kalevala (1835, enlarged 1849) from short ballads and lyric poems he gathered from Finnish oral tradition during several field expeditions in Finland, Russian Karelia, the Kola Peninsula and Baltic countries. In botany, he is remembered as the author of the 1860 Flora Fennica, the first scientific text written in Finnish rather than in Latin.

== Education and early life ==
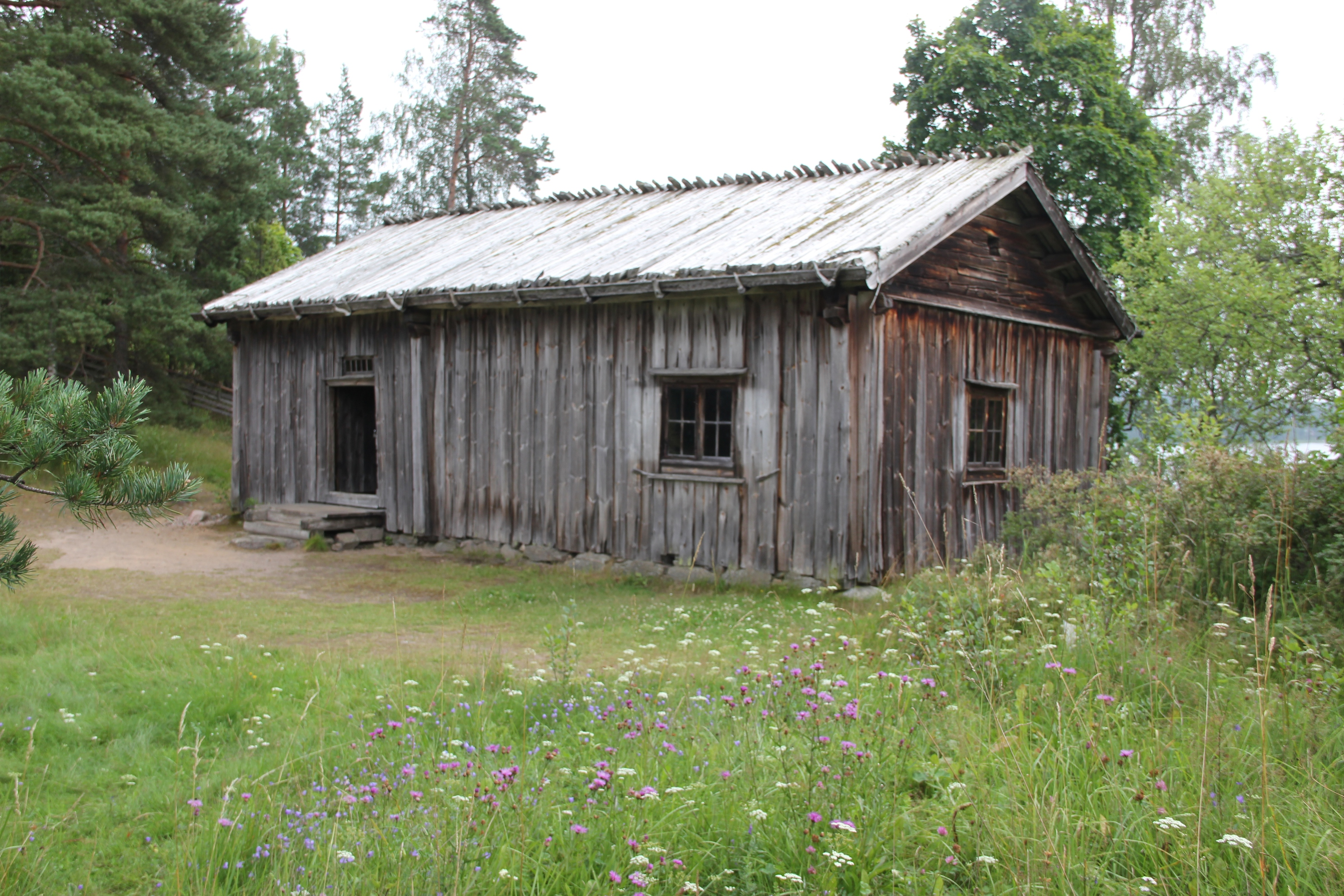
The cabin, Paikkarin torppa, where Lönnrot was born in Sammatti

Lönnrot was born in Sammatti, (Note: As of 2009, part of Lohja.) in the province of Uusimaa, Finland, which was then part of Sweden. From 1814 to 1815, he attended the school of Tammisaari Pedagogio. He studied at Turku Cathedral School from 5 April 1816 until he dropped out in the spring of 1818. After dropping out, he worked as a tailor and singer in Sammatti and nearby villages. He joined the Porvoo Gymnasium on 20 March 1820 but left on 9 April. For the next two years, he studied as an apothecary student at Hämeenlinna. In the summer of 1822, he lived in Sammatti as he prepared for the high school examination. On 11 October 1822, he enrolled in the Academy of Turku to study medicine. The Great Fire of Turku coincided with his first academic year. As the university was destroyed in the fire, it was moved to Helsinki, the newly established administrative center of the Grand Duchy of Finland. Lönnrot followed and graduated in 1832.

== Career ==
=== Medicine ===
Lönnrot lived in the village of Paltaniemi, when he got a job as district doctor of Kajaani in Eastern Finland during a time of famine and pestilence in the district.

=== Literature ===
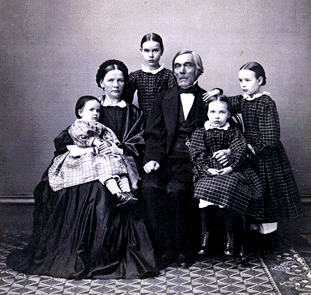
Lönnrot with his family in the early 1860s

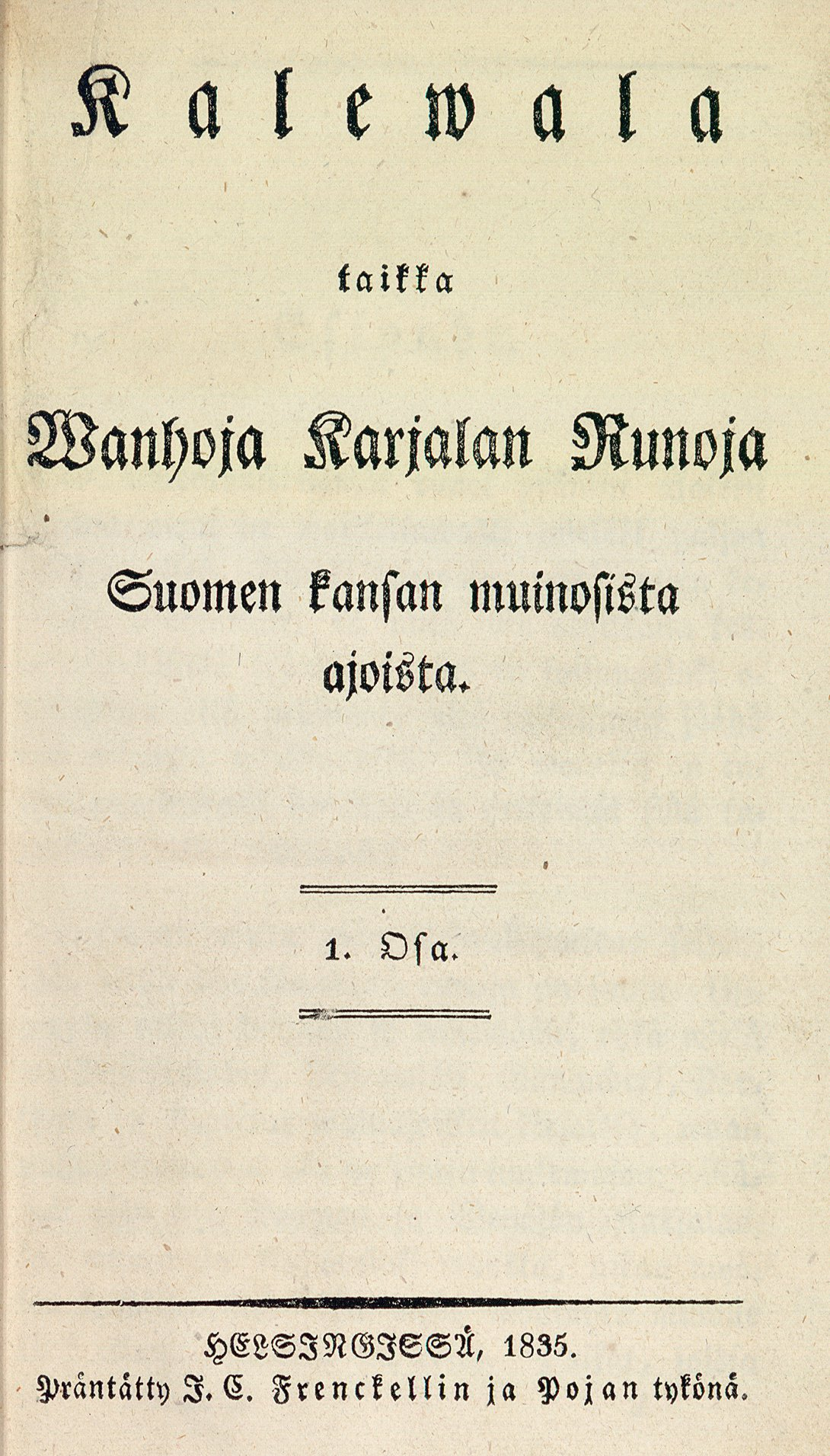
First edition of Kalevala, 1835

He began writing about the early Finnish language in 1827 and began collecting folk tales from rural people around the same time. In 1831, the Finnish Literature Society was founded, and Lönnrot, being one of the founders, received financial support from the society for his efforts to collect folk tales.

Lönnrot went on extended leaves of absence from his doctor's office; he toured the countryside of Finland, Sapmi (Lapland), and nearby portions of Russian Karelia. This led to a series of books: Kantele, 1829–1831 (the kantele is a Finnish traditional instrument); Kalevala, 1835–1836 (the "old" Kalevala), an edited collection of epic poems collected orally and representing a mythology for Finland; Kanteletar, 1840; Sananlaskuja, 1842 (Proverbs); an expanded second edition of Kalevala, 1849 (the "new" Kalevala). Lönnrot was recognised for his part in preserving Finland's oral traditions by appointment to the Chair of Finnish Literature at the University of Helsinki in 1853.

=== Lexicography ===
Lönnrot undertook the task of compiling the first Finnish-Swedish dictionary (Finsk-Svenskt lexikon, 1866–1880). The result comprised over 200,000 entries, and many of the Finnish translations were coined by Lönnrot himself. His vast knowledge of traditional Finnish poetry made him a definite authority in Finland and many of his inventions have stuck. Finnish scientific terminology was in particular influenced by Lönnrot's work and therefore many abstract terms that have a Latin or Greek etymology in most other European languages appear as native neologisms in Finnish. Examples from linguistics and medicine include kielioppi (grammar), kirjallisuus (literature), laskimo (vein) and valtimo (artery).

=== Botany ===
Lönnrot published the first Finnish-language Flora Fennica – Suomen Kasvisto ("Flora of Finland") in 1860; in its day it was famed throughout Scandinavia, as it was among the first common-language scientific texts. The second, expanded version was co-authored by Thomas Saelan and published in 1866. The Flora Fennica is the first botanical science work published in Finnish (instead of Latin). In addition, it includes many notes on plant uses in between descriptions of flowers and leaves.

== Impact ==
The Kalevala, the Finnish national epic that Lönnrot compiled, was among the inspirations for J. R. R. Tolkien's the Silmarillion and The Lord of the Rings.

Lönnrot was the main motif for the Finnish Elias Lönnrot and folklore commemorative coin, minted in 2002. On the reverse, a feather (as a symbol of an author) and Elias Lönnrot's signature can be seen. The Finnish graphic artist Erik Bruun used Lönnrot as a motif for the 500 markka banknote in his banknote series.

The Argentine author Jorge Luis Borges used the name Lönnrot, possibly alluding to the Finnish author, for the diligent detective in his story Death and the Compass (La muerte y la brújula).

The main belt asteroid 2243 Lönnrot was named after Lönnrot.

== Gallery ==
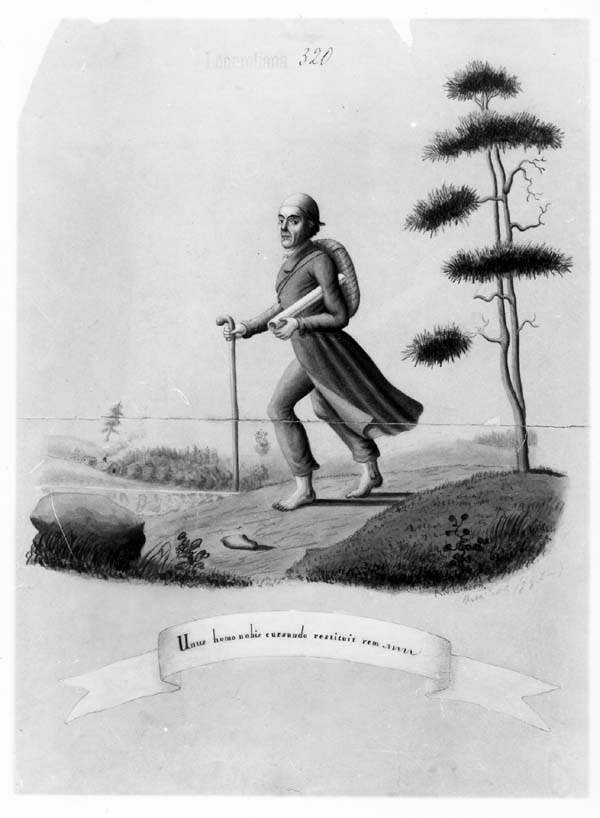
Caricature One Man Saved Everything for Us by Running by A. W. Linsen, 1847

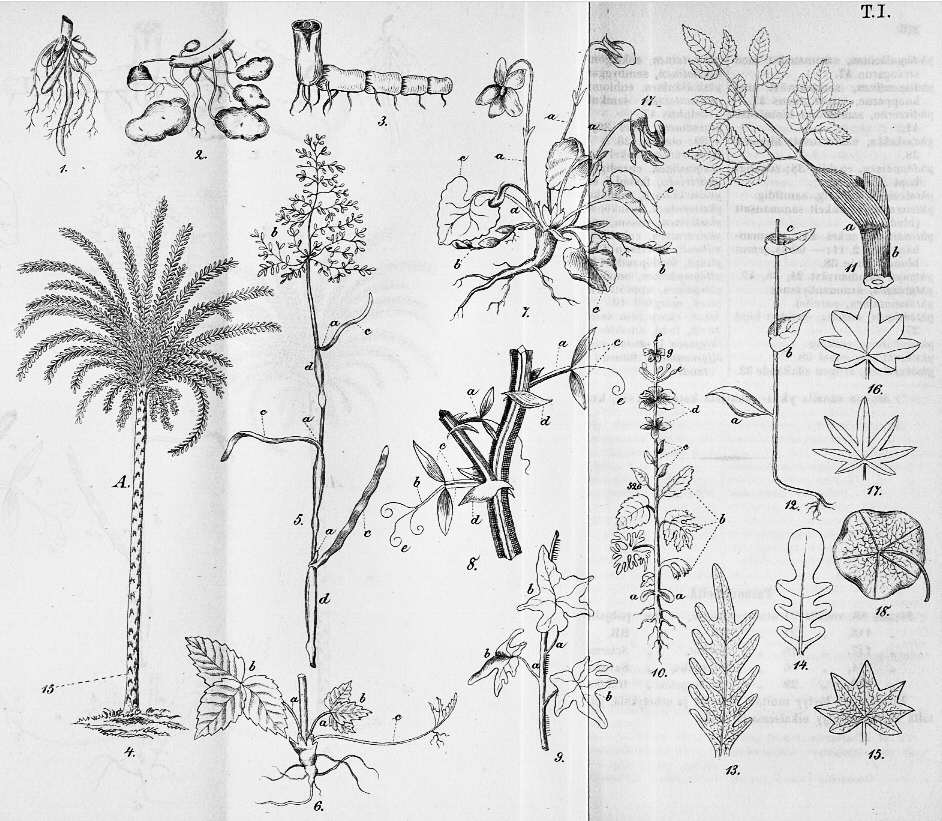
Flora Fennica compiled by Lönnrot, the first Finnish-language botanical science work published in 1860

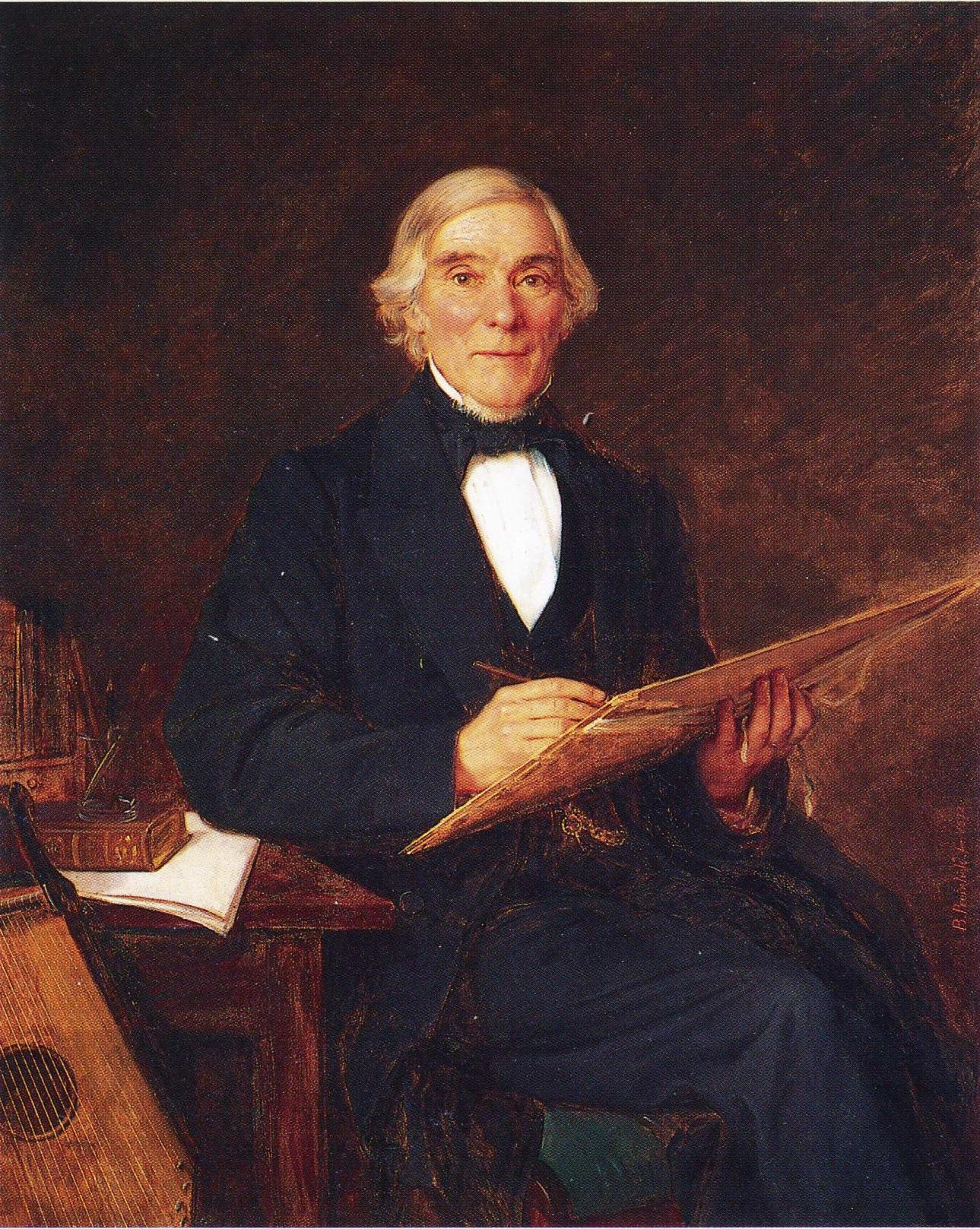
Portrait of Lönnrot by
Bernhard Reinhold, 1872

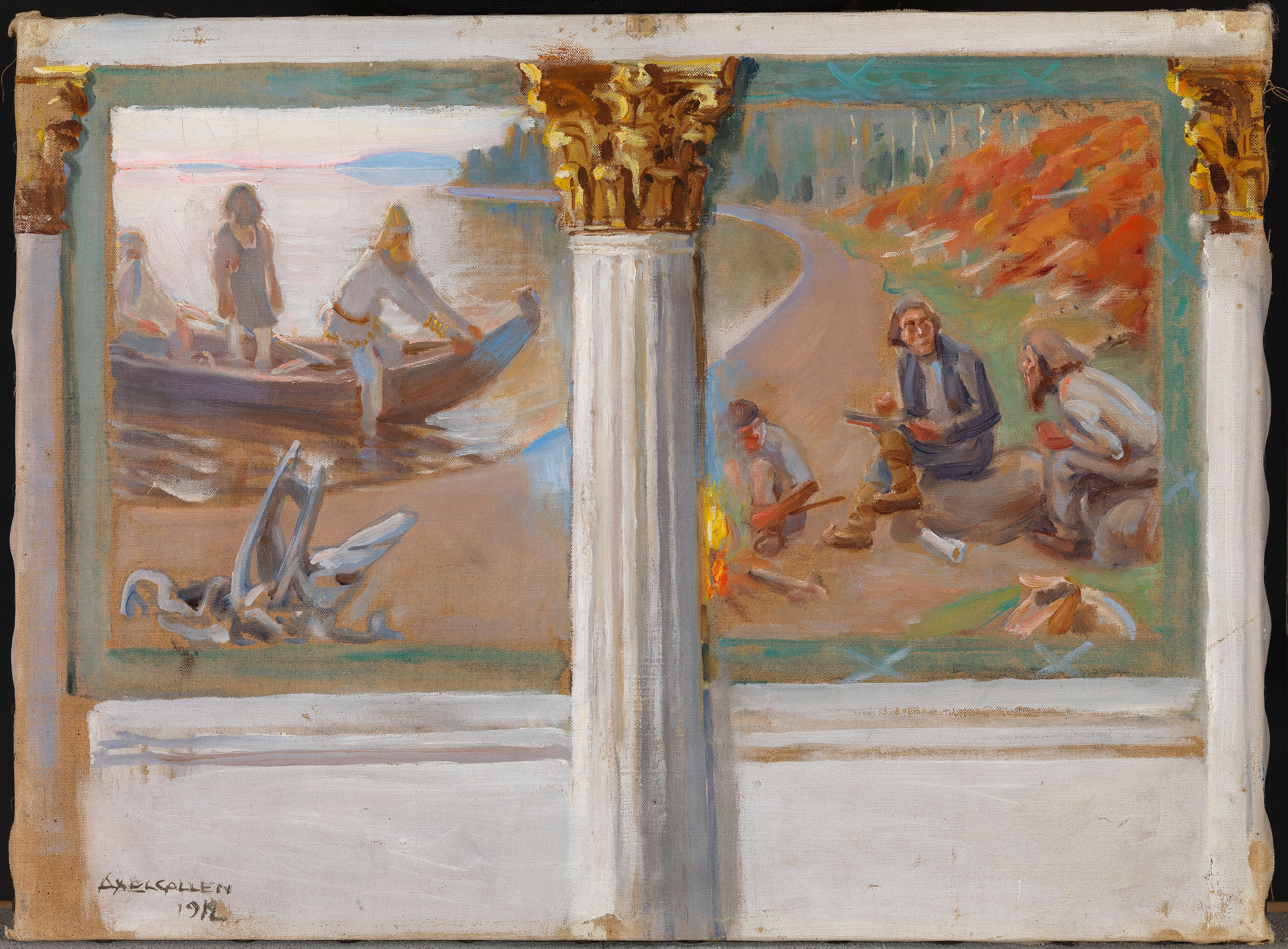
Lönnrot and the Oral Poets, sketch of how he collected the materials for the Kalevala by Akseli Gallen-Kallela for murals for University of Helsinki, 1912

== Publications ==
- Forselles, Jenny Mathilda (1908), Elias Lönnrots Svenska skrifter utgifna af Jenny af Forselles. 1., Skrifter utgivna av Svenska litteratursällskapet i Finland (in Swedish), Helsinki: Society of Swedish Literature in Finland, ISSN 0039-6842, Wikidata Q113396160
- Forselles, Jenny Mathilda (1911), Elias Lönnrots Svenska skrifter utgifna af Jenny af Forselles. 2, Bref, anteckningar och reseskildringar., Skrifter utgivna av Svenska litteratursällskapet i Finland (in Swedish), Helsinki: Society of Swedish Literature in Finland, ISSN 0039-6842, Wikidata Q113396181

== See also ==
- Day of the Finnish Language
