= Hiidenlinna =

Tourist attraction in Somero, Finland

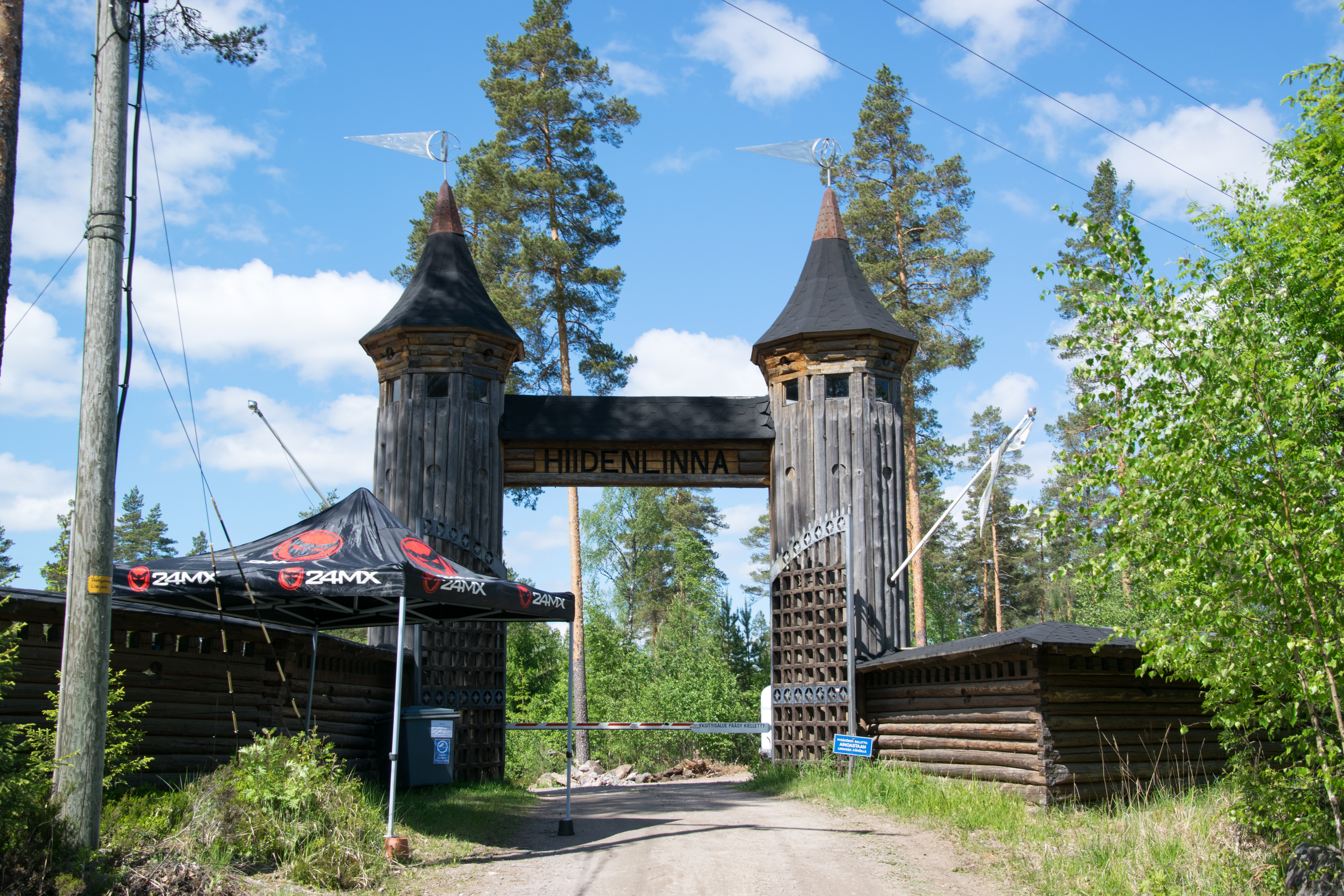
- Entrance of Hiidenlinna
- Interactive map of Hiidenlinna
- Location: Somerniemi, Somero, Finland
- Coordinates: 60°37′50.36″N 23°45′14.19″E
- Opened: 1992; 34 years ago
- Website: Official

Hiidenlinna (Finnish pronunciation: [ˈhiːdenˌlinːɑ]; lit. 'Hiisi's Castle') is a tourist attraction located in Somero's Somerniemi in Southwest Finland, Finland. Originally built in 1992 by local artist Reino Koivuniemi as his work and exhibition space, the tourist attraction is made of natural stone and concrete on the shore of Lake Särkijärvi in the Keltiäinen village, and displays Koivuniemi's own works alongside changing exhibitions. In 2006, Hiidenlinna was the eleventh most popular tourist destination in Southwest Finland.

Reino Koivuniemi, who had already reached retirement age in 2008, was looking for a buyer for Hiidenlinna who would continue the exhibition activities. In 2013, Hiidenlinna was purchased by skier Sami Uotila, a ski resort entrepreneur at Vihti Ski Center in Vihti. He announced that he intended to continue the castle's operations roughly according to the previous concept.
