= Lohja sub-region =

- Former sub-region
- Country: Finland
- Region: Uusimaa
- Time zone: UTC+2 (EET)
  - Summer (DST): UTC+3 (EEST)

Lohja sub-region was a subdivision of Uusimaa and one of the sub-regions of Finland. The sub-region was abolished in 2009 and merged into the Helsinki sub-region.

== Municipalities ==
Coat of arms	Municipality
Karjalohjan vaakuna	Karjalohja (municipality)
Karkkilan vaakuna	Karkkila (city)
Lohjan vaakuna	Lohja (city)
Nummi-Pusulan vaakuna	Nummi-Pusula (municipality)
Sammatin vaakuna	Sammatti (municipality)
Vihdin vaakuna	Vihti (municipality)

== History ==
- January 1, 1997 the city of Lohja and the Lohja municipality were merged.
- January 1, 2009 Sammatti is merged into Lohja.

=== After the abolition ===
- January 1, 2013 Nummi-Pusula and Karjalohja were merged into Lohja.
