= Artturi Aalto =

Finnish politician and journalist

Arthur (Artturi) August Aalto

Member of the Finland Parliament for Uusimaa Province
- In office 1919–1933

Personal details
- Born: May 2, 1876 Karjalohja, Finland
- Died: April 25, 1937 (aged 60) Tuusula, Finland
- Party: Social Democratic Party

Arthur (Artturi) August Aalto (originally Silfver; May 2, 1876 – April 25, 1937) was a Finnish Social Democratic politician and journalist. He was born in Karjalohja and was elected to the Parliament of Finland in 1919 election from Uusimaa Province and continued as MP until 1933. Aalto was a member of the electoral college for selecting the President of Finland in 1925 and 1931. He died in Tuusula.
