= Karjalohja =

- Former municipality
- Karjalohjan kunta Karislojo kommun
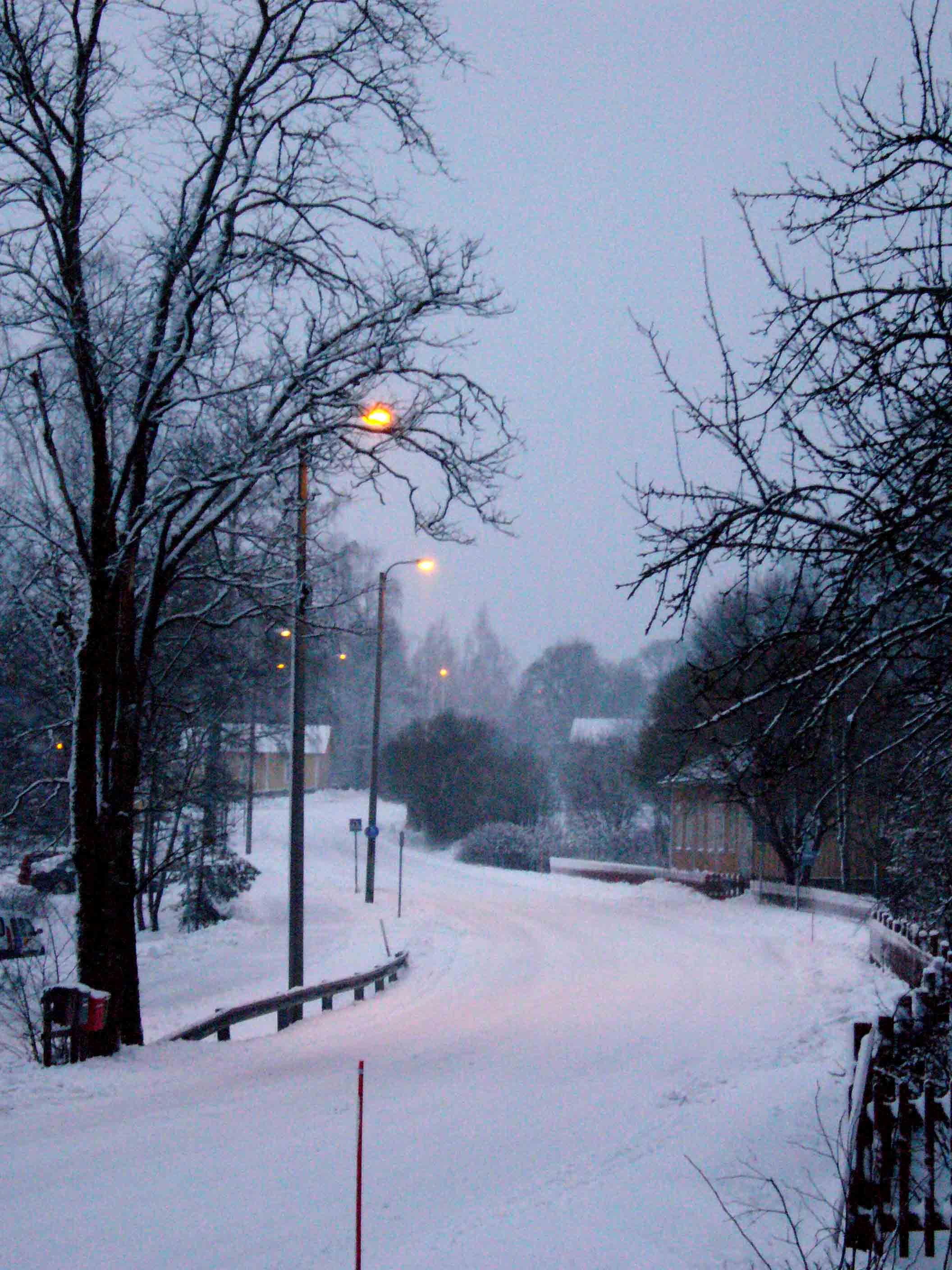
- Karjalohja in winter 2008

- Coat of arms

- Location of Karjalohja in Finland
- Coordinates: 60°14.5′N 023°43′E
- Country: Finland
- Region: Uusimaa
- Sub-region: Helsinki sub-region (formerly Lohja sub-region)
- Charter: 1614
- Consolidated: 2013

Government
  - Municipal manager: Henri Partanen

Area
  - Total: 163.40 km^{2} (63.09 sq mi)
  - Land: 121.29 km^{2} (46.83 sq mi)
  - Water: 42.11 km^{2} (16.26 sq mi)

Population (2012)
  - Total: 1,474
  - Density: 12.15/km^{2} (31.48/sq mi)
- Time zone: UTC+2 (EET)
  - Summer (DST): UTC+3 (EEST)
- Climate: Dfb
- Website: www.karjalohja.fi

Karjalohja (Finnish: [ˈkɑrjɑˌlohjɑ]; Swedish: Karislojo) is a former municipality of Finland.

It is located in the province of Southern Finland and is part of the Uusimaa region. Before merging into Lohja, the municipality had a population of 1,474 (31 December 2012) and covered an area of 163.40 square kilometres (63.09 sq mi) of which 42.11 km^{2} (16.26 sq mi) was water. The population density was 12.153/km^{2} (31.475/sq mi).

With Nummi-Pusula, Karjalohja was consolidated with the town of Lohja on 1 January 2013.

The municipality was unilingually Finnish.

== Villages ==
Prior to its consolidation into Lohja in 2013, Karjalohja contained the following villages:

- Härjänvatsa
- Ilmoniemi
- Immola
- Karkali
- Kattelus
- Kourjoki
- Kuusia
- Kärkelä
- Lohjantaipale
- Lönnhammar (Linhamari)
- Maila
- Makkarjoki
- Murto
- Mustlahti
- Nummijärvi
- Pappila
- Pellonkylä
- Pipola
- Pitkälahti (Långvik)
- Puujärvi
- Pyöli
- Saarenpää
- Sakkola
- Suurniemi
- Särkjärvi
- Tallaa
- Tammisto

== Politics ==
Results of the 2011 Finnish parliamentary election in Karjalohja:

- True Finns 21.9%
- Social Democratic Party 20.3%
- National Coalition Party 19.9%
- Centre Party 16.5%
- Green League 11.3%
- Left Alliance 4.2%
- Swedish People's Party 1.8%
- Christian Democrats 1.5%

== People born in Karjalohja ==
- Artturi Aalto (1876–1937)
- Arno Anthoni (1900–1961)
