= Nummi-Pusula =

- Former municipality
- Nummi-Pusulan kunta Nummis-Pusala kommun
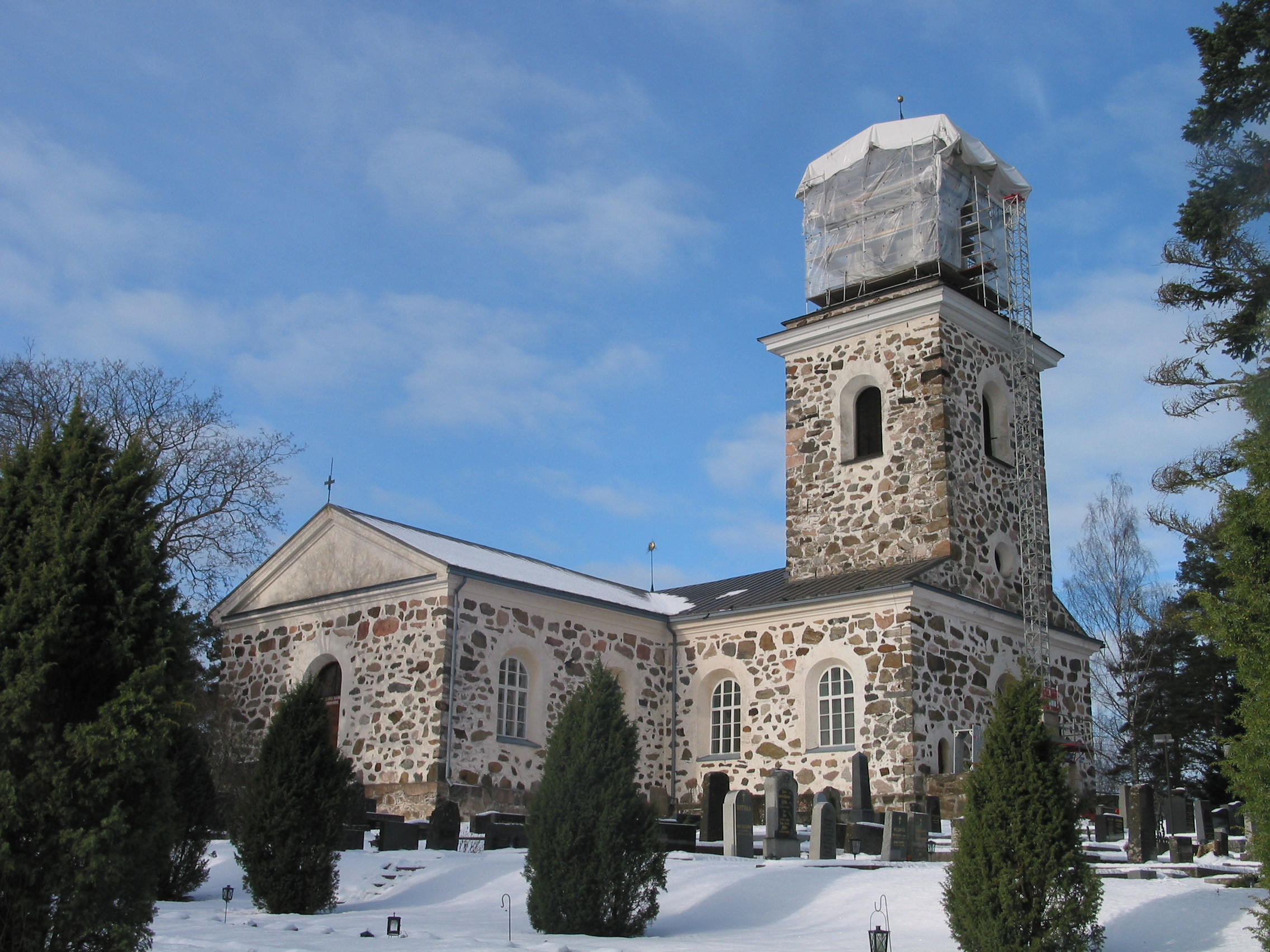
- Nummi Church

- Coat of arms

- Location of Nummi-Pusula in Finland
- Coordinates: 60°23.5′N 023°53′E
- Country: Finland
- Region: Uusimaa
- Sub-region: Helsinki sub-region (formerly Lohja sub-region)
- Charter: 1981
- Seat: Nummi

Government
  - Municipal manager: Eero Soinio

Area
  - Total: 505.13 km^{2} (195.03 sq mi)
  - Land: 468.33 km^{2} (180.82 sq mi)
  - Water: 36.8 km^{2} (14.2 sq mi)

Population (31 December 2012)
  - Total: 6,175
  - Density: 13.19/km^{2} (34.15/sq mi)
- Time zone: UTC+2 (EET)
  - Summer (DST): UTC+3 (EEST)
- Climate: Dfb
- Website: www.nummi-pusula.fi

Nummi-Pusula (Finnish pronunciation: [ˈnumːiˌpusulɑ]) is a former municipality of Finland. Its seat was in Nummi. Nummi-Pusula was formed in 1981 from the former municipalities Nummi and Pusula. With Karjalohja, it was merged with the town of Lohja on 1 January 2013.

It was located in the province of Southern Finland and was part of the Uusimaa region. The municipality has a population of 6,175 (31 December 2012) and covers an area of 505.13 square kilometres (195.03 sq mi) of which 36.8 km^{2} (14.2 sq mi) is water. The population density is 13.1851/km^{2} (34.1494/sq mi).

The municipality was unilingually Finnish.

== Villages ==
Prior to its consolidation into Lohja in 2013, Nummi-Pusula contained the following villages:

Nummi Section

- Haarla
- Hakula
- Heijala
- Heimola
- Huhti
- Hyrsylä
- Hyvelä
- Immola
- Jakova
- Järvenpää
- Jättölä
- Korkianoja
- Kovela
- Leppäkorpi
- Luttula
- Maikkala
- Maskila
- Mettula
- Miemola
- Millola
- Mommola
- Mäntsälä
- Nummi
- Näkkilä
- Oinola
- Oittila
- Pakkala
- Pälölä
- Raatti
- Remala
- Retlahti
- Röhkölä
- Salo
- Saukkola
- Sierla
- Sitarla
- Tavola
- Varttila
- Vivola

Pusula Section

- Ahonpää
- Hattula
- Hauhula
- Herrala
- Hirvijoki
- Hyrkkölä
- Hyönölä
- Ikkala
- Karisjärvi
- Kaukela
- Koisjärvi
- Kärkölä
- Marttila
- Mäkkylä
- Pusula
- Radus
- Seppälä
- Suomela
- Uusikylä
- Viiala
- Vörlö

== Politics ==
Results of the 2011 Finnish parliamentary election in Nummi-Pusula:

- True Finns 25.8%
- Centre Party 20.3%
- Social Democratic Party 18.8%
- National Coalition Party 18.0%
- Left Alliance 7.0%
- Green League 5.3%
- Christian Democrats 2.1%
- Swedish People's Party 0.8%

== Twinnings ==
- Abja Parish, Estonia (2004)
